= N+ Univision =

News division of Univision

- Thumb
- News division of: Univision; N+
- Key people: Leopoldo Gomez (President, N+ Univision)
- Founded: 1987; 39 years ago
- Former names: Noticias Univision (1987-2026)
- Headquarters: Univision NewsPort; Univision Communications South Florida Headquarters, 8551 NW 30th Terrace, Doral, Florida, U.S.
- Major bureaus: International Headquarters, 8551 NW 30th Terrace, Doral, Florida; Mexico Headquarters, Mexico City, Mexico; Puerto Rico Headquarters; San Juan, Puerto Rico
- Area served: United States; Latin America
- Broadcast programs: Al Punto; Aquí y Ahora ¡Despierta América! Noticiero N+ Univision; Noticiero N+ Univision: Edición Nocturna; Primer Impacto
- Owner: TelevisaUnivision
- Website: nmasunivision.com

N+ Univision (formerly known as Noticias Univision) is the news division of American Spanish-language television network Univision, a division of TelevisaUnivision. The news division is based out of the network's facilities, referred to as the "NewsPort", in the Miami suburb of Doral, Florida, which it currently shares with Univision's flagship owned-and-operated station WLTV-DT.

The division's flagship program is Noticiero Univision, consisted of two nightly evening newscasts (airing in the early and late evening) focusing on international news and stories of relevance to the network's main target demographic of Hispanic and Latino Americans. Other programs produced by the news division include morning news-talk show ¡Despierta América!, newsmagazine series Primer Impacto and Aquí y Ahora, and Sunday morning political affairs program Al Punto con Jorge Ramos.

N+ Univision maintains bureaus located at many of the network's television stations across the United States (particularly those owned by parent subsidiary Univision Television Group, that serve as owned-and-operated stations of the network) and throughout Latin America. Noticiero Univision also has news share agreements with many of the national terrestrial networks in those same nations and will often carry their footage and reporting with credit. Noticias Univision uses content from Mexico-based broadcaster (and Univision's major content partner) Televisa, Venezuela-based Venevision, Colombia-based RCN TV, Peru-based América Televisión, and regional-wide CNN en Español.

The division's tagline is "Ahora somos más" ("Now, we are more").

== Overview ==
The national newscasts began on KMEX-DT on June 1, 1981, when the network was known as the Spanish International Network, and before the network's name change in 1987 was known as Noticiero Nacional SIN. In 1987, Televisa owner Emilio Azcárraga Milmo, who also oversaw SIN (then a subsidiary of the Mexico City-based company), appointed former Televisa news anchor Jacobo Zabludovsky as director of SIN's news division; the move met with protest among staff at the news division, concerned over the extent of the autonomy of SIN's news department and potential censorship in its journalistic practices (specifically, the reporting on the Fidel Castro regime in Cuba, which while recognized in Mexico, did not have aspects that led to the migration of Cubans to the United States), with most news staffers opting to quit.

After Azcárraga and Emilio Nicolas Sr. subsequently sold their interests in SIN parent Spanish International Communications to Hallmark Cards after the Federal Communications Commission (FCC) and the U.S. Justice Department asked them to sell the network to a U.S.-based company amid inquiries as to whether Nicolas was being used by the Azcárraga family to skirt the FCC's rules prohibiting foreign ownership of broadcast media, in 1987, the newly renamed Univision appointed Roberto FE Soto – a former producer at NBC News – to produce a revamped flagship evening newscast, Noticiero Univision, the latter becoming the network's youngest executive; the network also reassigned Jorge Ramos – then the host of the network's first attempt at a morning program, the two-hour-long Mundo Latino – and hired veteran journalist Maria Elena Salinas (the latter of whom replaced Teresa Rodriguez as anchor) to co-anchor the evolving network newscast.

Logo used from January 29, 2019, to January 11, 2026

Univision eventually decided to expand its news programming to afternoons; in 1992, the network debuted Noticias y Más ("News and More"), anchored by Jackie Nespral, Ambrosio Hernandez and Raúl Peimbert; Myrka Dellanos joined the program after Nespral's departure later that year. Hernandez and Peimbert left Univision in 1993 to join Telemundo, while Nespral became co-host of the weekend edition of NBC's Today. Univision had other plans for the moribund show: the network revamped its format, changed its name and its theme music, and hired Puerto Rican-born María Celeste Arrarás as a weekend reporter to serve as Dellanos' partner; the retooled newsmagazine series became Primer Impacto ("First Impact") in February 1994.

Then on April 14, 1997, Univision replaced reruns of Televisa-produced children's programs (such as Plaza Sesamo {the Latin American version of Sesame Street}) and re-entered into the morning news arena for the first time in eight years with the premiere of ¡Despierta América! ("Wake Up America!"). Maintaining a format similar to its English language counterparts, it was designed to compete with (and was loosely based on the format of) Today, ABC's Good Morning America and CBS This Morning, with a focus on the network's Hispanic and Latino target demographic. The program quickly grew into a major competitor, increasing Univision's viewership in its morning time period by more than 46% by April 1998, and developed a unique style in its reporting of various types of news stories (including health, lifestyle, fashion, beauty and entertainment news, the latter of which was featured as part of a segment called "échate pa' acá" ("Come here") with a focus on popular Latino actors and musicians).

In 1998, Univision premiered a prime time investigative news magazine Aquí y Ahora ("Here & Now"), which focuses on in-depth investigative pieces and interviews with newsmakers. From 2000 to 2010, Univision was the only major U.S. broadcast network to increase its news viewership, while its English-language counterparts on ABC, NBC and CBS each lost half of their total viewership. By the early 2000s, as the network expanded its national reach through the signing of new over-the-air affiliates, Univision's news programs had grown to regularly outrank its Spanish-language competitors, with the early-evening edition of Noticiero Univision often placing ahead of its English language rivals (NBC Nightly News, ABC World News Tonight and the CBS Evening News) among viewers in the 18-49 age demographic. On September 9, 2007, the network premiered the first Sunday morning talk show on Spanish-language American television, Al Punto ("On Point"), a program moderated by Jorge Ramos that features discussions on political and socioeconomic issues pertinent to Latino Americans.

On December 9, 2010, Univision announced that it had hired Isaac Lee as the president of its news division; His duties were expanded upon on October 4, 2013, when he was named chief executive officer of its new cable news channel Fusion, and further in February 2015, when he became president of Univision's digital media operations through a reorganization of that division.

In March 2011, the network hosted its first Presidential town hall meeting; the televised special – which was watched by more than 2.7 million viewers, and featured anchor Jorge Ramos and President Barack Obama – focused on the future of education in the United States. Noticias Univision would later produce two town hall debates between presidential incumbent Obama and Republican challenger Mitt Romney the following year in the run-up to the 2012 Presidential elections.

Also in 2011, Noticias Univision formed two new departments within the news division: an investigative reporting unit, which was led by Pulitzer Prize winner Gerardo Reyes, and a documentary unit, which produced several critically acclaimed films on issues affecting the Latin American and international communities. The division's expanded commitment to investigative journalism helped Noticias Univision earn multiple journalism awards since 2012 including Peabody and Investigative Reporters and Editors Awards for its investigative piece on Operation Fast and Furious, two Gracie Awards, a Cronkite Award for Excellence in Political Journalism and fourteen other award wins for five documentaries produced by both units. In addition, the Academy of Television Arts and Sciences honored Jorge Ramos and Maria Elena Salinas with Lifetime Achievement Awards at the 33rd News & Documentary Emmy Awards in 2012.

In March 2013, Noticias Univision and Participant Media announced a partnership to co-produce ten, one-hour documentaries to air on Pivot Channel in English and on Univision in Spanish. Three months later, in June of that year, the Documentary Unit produced Violación de un Sueño ("Rape in the Fields"), which was produced in partnership with the PBS documentary program Frontline and the Center for Investigative Reporting.

== Programming ==
=== Noticiero N+ Univision ===
The network's flagship newscast, Noticiero N+ Univision, is a traditional evening news program that provides a general rundown of the day's news headlines, with more of a bent towards stories occurring in Latin America and, domestically, news stories and issues of utmost importance to Hispanic and Latino Americans. Because of this, reports focusing on immigration and diplomatic relations with Latin America are regularly highlighted on the program, in addition to issues relating to government, healthcare and economic issues. The main early-evening broadcast of the program is currently co-anchored by Jorge Ramos and Maria Elena Salinas (who have shared those duties since 1986, a departure from the traditional single-anchor format used by the evening newscasts of its English language competitors ABC, NBC and CBS), and Félix de Bedout and Arantxa Loizaga on weekend evenings. The program is on equal footing with the English language newscasts ratings-wise in urban areas with a large Hispanic population, often being the top network newscast in areas such as New York City, Chicago, Los Angeles, San Francisco, San Antonio, Dallas, Houston, Tulsa, Oklahoma City, Philadelphia, Indianapolis, South Bend, Cleveland, Atlanta, Nashville, Washington, D.C., Denver, Phoenix, Tucson, Raleigh, Minneapolis, Boston, Salt Lake City, Sacramento, San Diego, Las Vegas, Orlando, Tampa and Miami.

A secondary late-night edition of the program, Noticiero N+ Univision: Edición Nocturna ("N+ Univision News: Evening Edition"), airs nightly at 11:30 p.m. Eastern and Pacific Time (with a rebroadcast at 4:30 a.m. local time). The program – which is one of only two traditional national newscasts among the major U.S. broadcast networks (alongside Hechos on competitor Azteca) that airs in a late-evening time slot – maintains a similar format to the early-evening edition, with more of a focus on major news headlines; however, the program utilizes separate anchors from the early broadcast for the weeknight editions. From 1999 to 2011, the late-evening newscast was known as Noticiero Univision Ultima Hora, maintaining an in-depth, investigative focus anchored by Enrique Gratas.

=== Current programs ===
- Noticiero N+ Univision (1981–present; originally titled Noticiero Nacional SIN from 1981 to 1987)
- Noticiero N+ Univision: Edición Nocturna (2009–present)
- Noticiero N+ Univision: Edición Digital (September 12, 2016–present)
- Al Punto ("To the Point"; 2007–present) – a Sunday morning political and cultural affairs program, hosted by Jorge Ramos (it was the only Spanish language Sunday morning talk show on U.S. television until Telemundo debuted Enfoque in 2011)
- ¡Despierta América! (1997–present) – a morning news and lifestyle program featuring half-hourly news updates from Noticias Univision
- Primer Impacto (1994–present) – an hour-long newsmagazine on Monday through Friday afternoons (which originally aired as a seven-day-a-week broadcast until 2007), focusing on news headlines, caught-on-tape stories, feature segments and entertainment stories
- Primer Impacto Extra (1994–present) – a condensed half-hour edition of Primer Impacto (which airs in place of late local newscasts on affiliates without their own news department or which choose to preempt regularly scheduled local newscasts on certain holidays).
- Aquí y Ahora ("Here and Now"; 2001–present) – a Sunday evening investigative newsmagazine

Noticias N+ Univision also produces 60-second news capsules (titled Breve Informativo de Noticiero N+ Univision, or "N+ Univision News Brief") that air during commercial breaks – except those featured during the Noticiero N+ Univision-branded early and late newscasts – each hour throughout the broadcast day on Univision, and provides special report cut-ins within regular programming if needed during breaking news events. Some newsmagazine programs produced by Televisa (such as Hoy and Tras la Verdad) also air as part of the network's schedule.

=== Former programming ===
- Noticias y Más (1990–1994)
- Noticiero Univision: Última Hora (1999–2011)

== Other services ==
=== Fusion ===
Fusion is a digital cable and satellite television channel operated by Fusion Media Network, LLC, a joint venture between Univision Communications and the Disney-ABC Television Group subsidiary of The Walt Disney Company, which launched on October 28, 2013. Relying in part on the resources of the news divisions operated by the respective companies, ABC News and Noticias Univision, the network carries a broad mix of news, lifestyle, pop culture, satire and entertainment programs aimed at English-speaking millennial adults between the ages of 18 and 34 (marking Univision's first major push into English-language programming), including those of Hispanic and Latino American heritage. Fusion operates out of Noticias Univision's "Newsport" facility in Doral, Florida; although, while Univision handles programming responsibilities for Fusion and Disney-ABC Television Group provides advertising sales and distribution for the channel, it operates independently from ABC News and Noticias Univision, employing its own hosts and correspondents, management, production staff and board of directors.

In December 2010, Noticias Univision president Isaac Lee announced plans to start an English language cable news channel aimed at American Hispanics; after Univision Communications reached an agreement with The Walt Disney Company to partner in the development of the channel, the two companies formally announced its launch on May 8, 2012. Through its focused target demographic, which is regarded as being fluent in digital consumption and favors social media and internet sources over traditional broadcast and print media for receiving news content, the network operates FusionLive, an online and mobile streaming service available to subscribers of participating cable and satellite providers.

=== Univision Noticias ===
Univision Noticias is a planned Spanish language cable news channel, which Univision Communications announced on May 19, 2011, in a press release mentioning the launch of three specialty cable channels. Univision secured a carriage deal with satellite provider Dish Network to carry Univision Noticias and sister networks Univision Deportes Network and Univision tlnovelas in January 2012; As of October 2015, however, the network has not yet launched.

=== Univision News (website) ===
Noticias Univision also maintains a separate website – powered through a partnership with Tumblr – and a companion Twitter feed, under the banner Univision News. The website and feed provides national and international news content presented in English, intended to cater to Hispanics and other news consumers not fluent in the Spanish language.

=== The Root ===
On May 21, 2015, Univision Communications announced that it would acquire The Root, a magazine-style news and culture website aimed at African-Americans, from the Slate Group division of Graham Holdings Company (whose chairman and CEO, Donald E. Graham, co-founded the site with Henry Louis Gates Jr. in 2008). The deal will allow The Root to use Univision Communications' digital production facilities and publishing infrastructure, although it will maintain editorial autonomy over its content and its existing editorial staff (including managing editor Lyne Pitts and publisher and vice president of digital content Donna Byrd, the latter of whom was also appointed as a member of the Univision Digital division's management staff).

== On–air staff ==
=== Notable current on–air staff ===
- (Mexico) Enrique Acevedo – weeknight anchor, Noticiero Univision: Edición Nocturna
- (Colombia) Ilia Calderón – weeknight anchor, Noticiero Univision
- (Mexico) Elián Zidán — weeknight anchor, Noticiero Univision: Edición Nocturna
- (Mexico) María Antonieta Collins – senior special correspondent, Noticias Univision
- (Peru) Pamela Silva Conde – co-anchor, Primer Impacto
- (Colombia) Félix de Bedout – weekend anchor, Noticiero Univision: Fin de Semana

=== Notable former on–air staff ===
† Indicates person is deceased

- (Mexico) Martin Berlanga (now at KTMD in Houston, Texas)
- (United States) Bárbara Bermudo – co-anchor, Primer Impacto
- (Puerto Rico) María Celeste Arrarás (now at Telemundo)
- (Cuba) Myrka Dellanos (later at Estrella TV)
- (United States) María Elena Salinas
- (Argentina) Enrique Gratas (later at Estrella TV until his death)
- (United States) Jackie Nespral (now at WTVJ in Miami)
- (Mexico) Raul Peimbert
- (United States) Edna Schmidt
- (Venezuela) Mariana Atencio (now at NBC)

== Bureaus ==
=== Major bureaus ===
- Doral, Florida – Univision NewsPort
- Los Angeles, California – West Coast Headquarters
- Washington, D.C. – Governmental Affairs Headquarters
- New York City, New York — East Coast Headquarters
- San Francisco, California — Northwest Headquarters
- Mexico City, Mexico – Mexico Headquarters
- Bogotá, Colombia — Colombia Headquarters
- San Salvador, El Salvador — El Salvador Headquarters
- Buenos Aires, Argentina — Argentina Headquarters
- Santo Domingo, Dominican Republic — Dominican Republic Headquarters
- Quito, Ecuador — Ecuador Headquarters
- Santiago, Chile — Chile Headquarters
- Montevideo, Uruguay — Uruguay Headquarters
- Lima, Peru — Peru Headquarters
- Tegucigalpa, Honduras — Honduras Headquarters
- Caracas, Venezuela — Venezuela Headquarters
- San Antonio, Texas — Texas Headquarters
- Madrid, Spain — Foreign Headquarters

=== Minor bureaus (within the United States) ===
- Chicago, Illinois (WGBO-DT)^{1}
- Dallas, Texas (KUVN-DT)^{1}
- Miami, Florida (WLTV-DT)^{1}
- New York City, New York (WXTV-DT)^{1}

^{1} All Univision owned-and-operated stations are considered bureaus of Noticias Univision, including those not listed here.

== Criticism and controversies ==
=== Dispute with Donald Trump and criticism of Jorge Ramos ===
After Donald Trump launched his candidacy for the Republican presidential nomination in June 2015, Noticias Univision lead anchor Jorge Ramos pursued an interview with Trump to discuss the false comments he made in his declaratory campaign speech disparaging Mexican immigrants, falsely accusing Mexico of sending criminals, rapists and drug importers to the United States (which led Univision Communications to terminate its contract to air the Miss USA and Miss Universe pageants, which were set to air on sister network UniMás through a five-year deal signed that February, and prohibit its employees from conducting company business at Trump-owned hotels or resorts; Trump subsequently filed a $500 million breach of contract lawsuit against Univision over the contract termination). On June 26, Trump posted a handwritten correspondence letter sent by Ramos, requesting an interview with him, on Instagram, which contained Ramos' personal cell phone number for business use (which was unobscured), before deleting the post.

At a press conference held by Trump on August 25, 2015, at the Grand River Center in Dubuque, Iowa, Ramos – attempting to ask a question to Trump about his immigration policies without being called on beforehand, as Trump had pointed to another reporter in the audience – was rebuffed by Trump, who repeatedly asked Ramos to sit down and remarked to him to "go back to Univision." Security present at the conference escorted Ramos out of the hotel's conference room, where one member of the security team (whom campaign officials denied was a Trump staffer) told Mexican-born Ramos – who became an American citizen in 2008 – to "get out of my country." An aide for Trump invited Ramos to re-enter the conference about 15 minutes later on the pretense that he wait to be called upon, engaging in a heated exchange with Trump on his hardline stance on immigration when asked to field a question. In a series of interviews regarding his removal from the press conference, Ramos accused Trump of "spreading hate" and questioned the feasibility of Trump's campaign proposals to conduct mass deportations of undocumented families and repeal a statute in the U.S. Constitution granting birthright citizenship, later citing a poll which indicated 75% of prospective Latino voters held unfavorable opinions of him regarding Trump's viability as a presidential candidate. In a statement supporting Ramos, Univision chief executive officer Randy Falco blasted his treatment by Trump, calling it "beneath contempt" and suggesting that Trump comport himself better with members of the press as his campaign continues, stating "Mr. Trump demonstrated complete disregard for [Ramos] and for the countless Hispanics whom Jorge seeks to represent through press questions that are at the heart of the First Amendment."

As he has gained visibility in the general journalistic community in recent years, Ramos has received criticism of his balancing of journalistic ethics and an advocacy approach in his reporting (such as his criticism of the lack of Latino moderators for the U.S. presidential debates in which he stated that those sanctioning the debates were "stuck in the 1950s", and his challenging of presidential candidates Barack Obama and Mitt Romney's immigration policies in a Univision-produced political forum in which Ramos served as a moderator), with Luis Silberwasser, president of rival network Telemundo (whose executive vice president of network news, Luis Carlos Velez, also made veiled criticisms that Univision was not promoting "fair, balanced and objective journalism"), citing a poll of Hispanic and Latino adults conducted in conjunction with sister network NBC and The Wall Street Journal that stated immigration, as while being important, was "not [a] defining issue, as other media outlets would lead you to believe" in the 2016 election season. Similarly as did Trump, Ramos was criticized for his line of questioning at the Dubuque conference, with syndicated columnist Ruben Navarrette Jr. stating that Ramos acted "unprofessional" and "play[ed] into every negative stereotype that Americans subscribe to about Mexicans;" Fox News media critic Howard Kurtz stating that Ramos had behaved "like a heckler;" CNN political commentator Jeffrey Lord accusing Ramos of playing the "race card" despite being a "blue-eyed, light-skinned[...] European Mexican" and "dividing the country by race;" and Politico writer Marc Caputo calling Ramos biased for his open support for immigration reform, although Intercept writer Glenn Greenwald defended him, pointing out American journalists such as Thomas Paine and Edward R. Murrow who have balanced opinion and advocacy. Ramos stated in regards to his approach to journalism, "Our position is clearly pro-Latino or pro-immigrant ... We are simply being the voice of those who don't have a voice"; in an October 2015 New Yorker interview, Ramos also noted that Latino Americans "have almost no political representation", specifically criticizing Republican candidates Marco Rubio and Ted Cruz for not "defend[ing] the undocumented."

A situation similar to that of the Dubuque incident involving Ramos occurred on October 24, 2015, as news crews belonging to Noticias Univision and Miami owned-and-operated station WLTV-DT – although the division and station were reportedly given media clearance to cover the event – was ordered to leave a campaign event held for Trump at the hotel on the Trump National Doral Miami complex (located near Univision's Doral studios) by an off-duty police officer who informed them that they were not allowed on the property.

== See also ==
- Fusion – an English-language news channel jointly operated by Univision and ABC News launched on October 28, 2013
- Univision Noticias – a planned Spanish-language cable and satellite news channel.
