= Walter Cronkite Award for Excellence in Journalism =

Annual journalism career award

The Walter Cronkite Award for Excellence in Journalism is an annual award presented by Arizona State University's Walter Cronkite School of Journalism and Mass Communication. The recipient is deemed to represent a leading figure in the journalism industry, especially for ground-breaking achievements which have advanced the industry as a whole. The first award was presented by legendary journalist Walter Cronkite himself in 1984.

== Recipients ==
Year	Recipient	Position at Time of Award
2027	Tony Kornheiser	Co-hosts of ESPN's Pardon the Interruption
2027	Michael Wilbon	Co-hosts of ESPN's Pardon the Interruption
2026	Jorge Ramos	Co-hosts of Noticiero Univision
2026	Maria Elena Salinas	Co-hosts of Noticiero Univision
2025	Wolf Blitzer	CNN anchor of The Situation Room with Wolf Blitzer
2024	David Muir	ABC World News Tonight with David Muir and co-anchor of ABC’s 20/20
2023	Gayle King	CBS Mornings anchor
2022	Al Roker	Today anchor and weatherman
2020	Dean Baquet	The New York Times executive editor
2019	Lester Holt	NBC Nightly News anchor
2018	Anderson Cooper	CNN anchor, Anderson Cooper 360
2017	Judy Woodruff	PBS NewsHour co-anchors and managing editors
2017	Gwen Ifill (Note: Awarded posthumously: Ifill died on November 14, 2016.)	PBS NewsHour co-anchors and managing editors
2016	Scott Pelley	CBS Evening News anchor
2015	None (Note: The 2015 award was given to Charlie Rose, but the award was rescinded on November 24, 2017, after a number of sexual misconduct accusations were leveled against him.)	
2014	Robin Roberts	Good Morning America anchor
2013	Bob Schieffer	Face the Nation moderator
2012	Bob Costas	Football Night in America host
2011	Christiane Amanpour	This Week with Christiane Amanpour anchor
2010	Diane Sawyer	World News with Diane Sawyer anchor
2009	Brian Williams	NBC Nightly News anchor and managing editor
2008	Robert MacNeil	Longtime PBS news anchors of The MacNeil/Lehrer Report
2008	Jim Lehrer	Longtime PBS news anchors of The MacNeil/Lehrer Report
2007	Jane Pauley	former anchor of NBC's Today Show and founding co-host of Dateline NBC
2006	Tom Brokaw	NBC Nightly News former anchor
2005	Dave Barry	Pulitzer Prize-winning humor columnist of the Miami Herald
2004	Charles Osgood	Host of The Osgood File and CBS News Sunday Morning
2003	Andy Rooney	60 Minutes correspondent
2002	Al Michaels	ABC Sports sportscaster
2001	Bob Woodward	Pulitzer Prize-winning reporter for The Washington Post
2000	Cokie Roberts	ABC News correspondent
1999	Tom Johnson	President of CNN
1998	Ben Bradlee	Executive editor of The Washington Post (1965–91)
1997	Roone Arledge	Chairman of ABC News
1996	Charles Kuralt	Former host of On the Road and CBS News Sunday Morning
1995	Bill Moyers	PBS host and producer
1994	Bernard Shaw	CNN anchor
1993	Helen Thomas	White House bureau chief of United Press International
1992	Don Hewitt	Creator and executive producer of 60 Minutes
1991	George Will	Pulitzer Prize-winning syndicated columnist and author
1990	Ted Turner	Chairman and president of TBS and founder of CNN
1989	Malcolm Forbes	Publisher and editor-in-chief of Forbes magazine
1988	Allen H. Neuharth	Chairman of Gannett Co. and founder of USA Today
1987	Katharine Graham	Chairwoman of the board of the Washington Post Co.
1986	Otis Chandler	Publisher of the Los Angeles Times
1985	Bill Mauldin	Pulitzer Prize-winning editorial cartoonist
1984	William Paley	Founder of CBS
1984	Frank Stanton	Former president of CBS
