= Frank Medina =

US Army officer

- Born: 1979 (age 46–47); Ponce, Puerto Rico
- Military career
- Allegiance: United States
- Branch: United States Army
- Service years: 2002-2011
- Rank: Captain
- Conflicts: Iraq War

Frank Medina is a former U.S. Army captain who organized and managed the successful nationwide campaign to award the Congressional Gold Medal to the U.S. Army's 65th Infantry Regiment, also known as the Borinqueneers.

The Congressional Gold Medal is the highest civilian honor that can be awarded by the United States. As of 2014, only six other military units have received this award: The Tuskegee Airmen, the Navajo Code Talkers, the Native American Code Talkers, the Nisei Japanese soldiers, the Women Airforce Service Pilots (WASPs), and the Montford Point Marines. Until 2014, when the Borinqueneers received it, the only Latino in U.S. history to be awarded the Congressional Gold Medal was Roberto Clemente.

== Early life and education ==
Medina was born in 1979 in Ponce, Puerto Rico. His family moved to the United States during his childhood, and he grew up in Bridgeport, Connecticut.

In 2002, he graduated from the United States Military Academy at West Point. He earned a Bachelor of Science degree in Engineering Management in West Point, with a minor in Electrical Engineering.

In June 2012, Medina graduated from the University of Florida with a Master of Science degree in Industrial & Systems Engineering, with a minor in Information Systems. He holds the Project Management Professional certification along with several IT/Telecommunication certifications.

== Military service ==
Medina served in the Iraq War and rose to the rank of captain.

After West Point he went to he Signal corps officer basic course and his first duty station in South Korea. He also served in Fort Hood; Honduras; Kuwait; and a combat tour in Iraq with Operation Iraqi Freedom. He served as a U.S. Army Signal Corps officer. After leaving active duty, Medina continued serving in the United States Army Reserve. He earned Bronze Star Medal, Meritorious Service Medal, Army Commendation Medal, and the Iraq Campaign Medal.

== The Boriqueneers ==
Capt. Medina first heard of the 65th Infantry Regiment from his Korean War veteran grandfather, Efraín Santiago, who talked about the discrimination that he and his fellow Puerto Rican Borinqueneers faced in the U.S. military. Over time, Medina was able to grasp the cultural context, and military significance, of the Borinqueneers' service during World War I, World War II, and the Korean War.

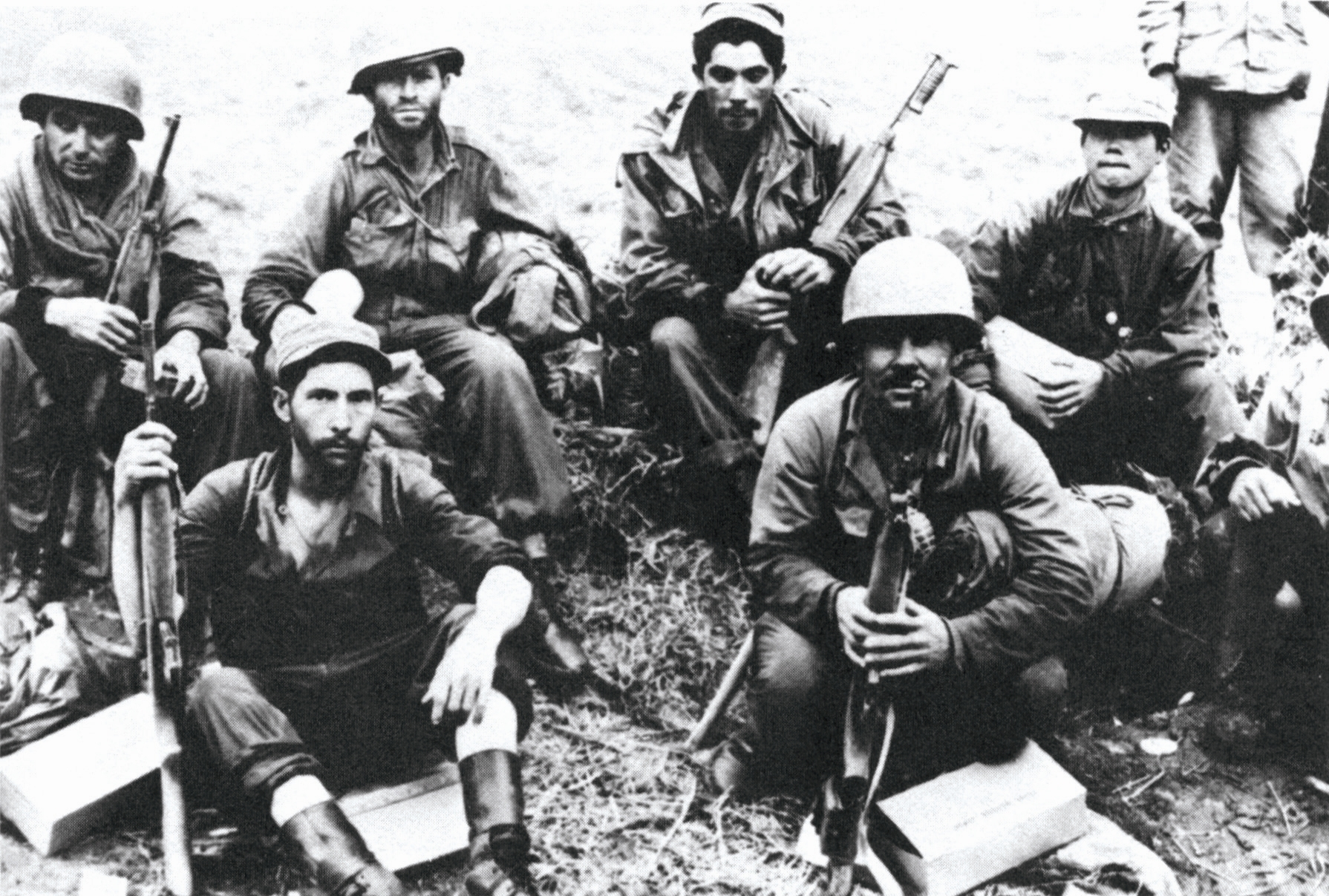
Borinqueneer soldiers in Korea, North of the Han River, 1951.

The Borinqueneers unit was created by the U.S. Congress in 1899 as an all-Puerto Rican unit, and is credited with waging the last battalion-sized bayonet assault in U.S. Army history.

The men of the 65th, now attached to the Army's 3rd Infantry Division, were amongst the first infantrymen to meet the enemy on the battlefields of Korea. After November 1950, they fought daily against units of the Chinese People's Liberation Army after the Chinese entered the war on the North Korean side.

External videos
- You can see a video of TV news anchor Jorge Ramos in a Spanish-language interview with a Borinqueneer and Frank Medina, for the Univision news show Al Punto, HERE

In April 1951, the regiment participated in the Uijonbu Corridor drives and in June 1951, the 65th was the third regiment to cross the Han Ton River. The 65th took and held Chorwon and were also instrumental in breaking the Iron Triangle of Hill 717 in July 1951. In November 1951, the regiment fought off an attack by two regimental size enemy units. Colonel Juan César Cordero Dávila was named commander of 65th Infantry on 8 February 1952, thus becoming one of the highest ranking ethnic officers in the Army.

The Borinqueneers were awarded battle participation credits for the following nine campaigns: UN Defense-1950, UN Offense-1950, CCF Intervention-1950, First UN Counterattack Offensive-1951, UN and CCF Spring Offensive-1951, UN Summer-Fall Offensive-1951, 2nd Korean Winter 1951–52, Korean Summer-Fall-1952 and 3rd Korean Winter-1952-53. They are also credited with the last battalion-sized bayonet assault in U.S. Army history.

During the Korean War, the Borinqueneers were awarded one Medal of Honor to Master Sargeant Juan E Negrón, nine Distinguished Service Crosses, 258 Silver Stars, 628 Bronze Stars, and 2,771 Purple Hearts. Seven hundred fifty Borinqueneers died in the Korean War.

== Congressional Gold Medal initiative ==
Medina's decision to bring recognition to the Borinqueneers occurred when he attended a service academy minority alumni reunion, where he met a man named Raul Reyes Castañeira. A Borinqueneer and Korean War vet, Castañeira was the youngest of four brothers who served in Korea with the regiment. During the event, Castañeira pointed to a Montford Point Marine and said, "that Marine has a Montford Point gold medal. How can we get one?" At that moment, Medina decided to take action.

External videos
- You can see a video of TV news anchor Jorge Ramos in an English-language interview of Borinqueneers and Frank Medina, for the multi-media show Fusion.net, HERE

In 2012, Medina founded the Borinqueneers Congressional Gold Medal Alliance—a group of individuals and organizations dedicated to obtaining the Congressional Gold Medal for the Borinqueneers, which was sponsored by the You Are Strong! Center on Veterans Health and Human Services. From 2012 until 2014, Medina was National Chair for the Borinqueneers Gold Medal Alliance, and the driving force behind the effort to pass a congressional bill to recognize the unit.

Medina and his colleagues, conducted a multi-front campaign which included nationwide cold calling, a website launch, and numerous letters to officials and legislators, including four Puerto Rican members of Congress: Rep. José E. Serrano (D-NY), Rep. Nydia Velasquez (D-NY), Rep. Luis Gutierrez (D-Ill.) and Rep. Raul Labrador (R-Idaho).

In Pennsylvania, Medina's efforts were supported locally by Pennsylvania State Senator Mike Stack, his legislative assistant Juvencio Gonzalez, and veterans organizations who urged the House of Representatives and Senate to take action. In Washington, DC, the staff of Resident Commissioner Pedro Pierluisi worked tirelessly, advocating and coordinating with both houses of congress, until a bill on behalf of the Borinqueeners was sponsored by U.S. Senator Richard Blumenthal (D-Conn.) and Congressman Bill Posey (R-Fla.).

On June 10, 2014, President Barack Obama signed the legislation to award the Congressional Gold Medal to the Borinqueneers.

In November 2014, Medina wrote an article about the Borinqueneers and the Congressional Gold Medal initiative, which was published in Army Magazine.

In March 2015, Medina was recognized for his organization and leadership of the national Congressional Gold Medal campaign initiative. His advocacy continues with support for the renaming of East Main Street after the Borinqueneers, in the town of Bridgeport, Ct.

== A national legacy ==
The 65th Infantry Regiment was deactivated in 1956. The Congressional Gold Medal initiative thus had sense of urgency to ensure that at least some of the Borinqueneers would be alive to be honored. In addition, Medina told ABC News that, "We need to weave the contributions of not only Hispanic veterans, but all Hispanics into the fabric of American culture. We definitely need to leave a positive image."

Medina was also reported as having one more goal in mind for the group. "They deserve to have a Hollywood movie made about them," he said.

== Recent work ==
After departing from active military service, Medina continued in the United States Army Reserve with the rank of mayor and worked as an IT network analyst and was assigned to Kabul, Afghanistan, where he viewed the progression of the country's nascent government rebuild into a modern society.

In June 2012, he graduated from the University of Florida with a Master of Science degree in Industrial & Systems Engineering with a minor in Information Systems. While completing his studies at the University of Florida, Medina helped to educate and mentor many undergraduate Hispanic students in the rigors of graduate school selection, admission applications and career advice/development, as well as what industry and occupations in which to specialize.

Medina holds the Project Management Professional certification along with several IT and Telecommunication certifications. He currently lives in Orlando, Florida, where he works with the Department of the Navy as a systems engineer for training and simulation technologies for U.S. Navy Aircraft.

== See also ==
- Military history of Puerto Rico
- List of Puerto Rican military personnel
- West Point (Notable Alumni)
