= Noticiero N+ Univision =

- Also known as: Noticiero Nacional SIN (1981–1983); Noticiero SIN (1983–1987); Noticiero N+ Univision: Fin de Semana (weekend editions, 1990–present); Noticiero N+ Univision: Edición Nocturna (weeknight late-evening editions, 1990–1999 and 2011–present); Noticiero Univision: Ultima Hora (weeknight late-evening editions, 1999–2011)
- Genre: News program
- Presented by: Weeknights: Ilia Calderón (2017–present); Edición Nocturna: Paulina Sodi (2026-present); Weekends: Félix de Bedout (2012–present) (for past anchors, see section below)
- Theme music composer: Carlos Marmo; Agustin Barreto
- Country of origin: United States
- Original language: Spanish

Production
- Production locations: Univision NewsPort, Doral, Florida
- Camera setup: Multi-camera
- Running time: 30 minutes
- Production company: N+ Univision

Original release
- Network: Spanish International Network
- Release: June 1, 1981 – 1987
- Network: Univision
- Release: 1987 – present

Noticiero N+ Univision (Spanish for 'Univision News'; Spanish pronunciation: [notiˈsjeɾo wniβiˈsjon]) is the flagship daily evening television news program of N+ Univision, the news division of the American Spanish language broadcast television network Univision. First aired on June 1, 1981, for Spanish International Network, the program provides a general rundown of the day's headlines, with a story focus that skews more towards events occurring in Latin America; story content relating to the United States on the program centers on news stories and issues of interest to Hispanic and Latino Americans (with reports focusing on immigration and diplomatic relations with Latin America highlighted regularly, as well as issues relating to government, healthcare and economic issues).

Since 1988, the flagship early-evening broadcast has been co-anchored by Jorge Ramos and María Elena Salinas; the program's late-evening edition, Noticiero Univision: Edición Nocturna (Spanish for 'Univision News: Late Edition'), is currently anchored by Ilia Calderón (who has served as anchor of that edition since 2009) and Enrique Acevedo (who joined the program in 2012). The program's weekend editions, Noticiero Univision: Fin de Semana (Spanish for 'Univision News: Weekend'), are currently co-anchored by Félix de Bedout (who joined the program in 2011) and Arantxa Loizaga (who became co-anchor in 2014).

The two evening programs are respectively broadcast live at 6:30 and 11:35 p.m. Eastern Time and Pacific Time seven nights a week (with rebroadcasts at 11:00 p.m. and 4:30 a.m. Eastern and Pacific, respectively for the early and late editions; the former of the two rebroadcasts is usually preempted by local newscasts on most of the network's broadcast stations). In addition, the parent Noticias Univision division airs co-branded hourly, one-minute news capsules under the title Breve Informativo de Noticiero Univision (Spanish for 'Univision News Brief') that air during commercial breaks – except those featured during the early- and late-evening newscasts – throughout the broadcast day on the network. Often, there will be special reports under the title Informe Especial de Noticiero Univision (Spanish for 'Univision News Special Report').

It is currently the most watched Spanish language network newscast in the United States, regularly beating its nearest rival, Telemundo's Noticiero Telemundo; it is also has some of the highest viewership among the key demographic of adults ages 18 to 49 among all evening news programs in the U.S., second only to NBC Nightly News, with a median viewer age of 44, at least ten years younger than the average age of its English language evening news competitors. The program is based out of Noticias Univision's "NewsPort" facilities in Doral, Florida.

== History ==
As the Spanish International Network (SIN), KMEX began broadcasting news programs on June 1, 1981, when the network debuted a weeknight newscast, Noticiero Nacional SIN ("SIN National News"), which originally aired as a single half-hour broadcast each weeknight at 6:30 p.m. Eastern Time. Guillermo Restrepo served as the newscast's first anchor and was later joined by Teresa Abate (later Teresa Rodriguez) - the latter of whom became the first Hispanic female anchor of a national newscast in the United States.

In 1987, after Spanish International Network co-founder Emilio Nicolas Sr. and Emilio Azcárraga Milmo (co-owner of Mexican broadcaster Televisa, who assumed part-ownership of SIN from his father Emilio Azcárraga Vidaurreta in 1972) sold their interests in parent company Spanish International Communications to Hallmark Cards after the Federal Communications Commission (FCC) and the U.S. Justice Department asked them to divest the network to a U.S.-based company amid inquiries into Nicolas' use by the Azcárraga family to skirt agency rules prohibiting foreign ownership of broadcast media outlets, In 1987, the network – which was renamed Univision following the purchase – appointed former NBC News producer Roberto FE Soto to produce a revamped flagship evening newscast, Noticiero Univision.

Mexican-born journalist Jorge Ramos – who joined SIN in 1984 as a reporter for KMEX and later host of the network's first morning program, Mundo Latino – was reassigned and paired alongside veteran KMEX journalist María Elena Salinas – who replaced Teresa Rodriguez as anchor – to co-anchor the evening newscast. In 1989, the program expanded to include a late-evening newscast, Noticiero Univision: Edición Nocturna ("Univision News: Evening Edition"), at 11:30 p.m. Eastern Time, which was solo anchored by Ramos throughout its original run; as well as two half-hour weekend editions under the title Noticiero Univision: Fin de Semana. For much of its existence, the late-night edition maintained a similar format to the early-evening broadcast, albeit with more of a focus on major news headlines and utilizes separate anchors on the weeknight editions.

In 1999, Univision hired veteran journalist Enrique Gratas – original host of the Telemundo newsmagazine Ocurrió Así – to anchor a revamped late-night newscast, Noticiero Univision: Ultima Hora ("Univision News: Final Hour"); Sergio Urquidi was subsequently appointed as weekend anchor of Noticiero Univision (joining María Antonieta Collins who has been anchoring Fin de Semana since 1990) and Ultima Hora. Debuting on October 23, 1999, of that year, the hour-long Ultima Hora (which reverted to a half-hour format in 2004) was modeled after the original format of Nightline, providing in-depth stories and analysis on three or four of the day's major news stories that were previously covered on the flagship evening newscast – occasionally covering late-breaking stories which had occurred since that broadcast – and interviews with newsmakers.

Noticiero Univision intro, used from January 23 to December 31, 2012.

In the summer of 2004, Telemundo signed María Antonieta Collins – who had been anchor of the weekend editions of Noticiero Univision – to a long-term contract to host a morning news and lifestyle program for the network, Cada Dia with Maria Antonieta ("Every Day with Maria Antonieta") (Collins would return to Noticias Univision as a senior special correspondent in 2011). On October 24, 2005, Edna Schmidt – then the national news anchor of the Noticias al Minuto newsbriefs on sister network TeleFutura (now UniMás) – was named as Collins' replacement as co-anchor of the weekend newscasts, joining Urquidi on the early evening edition.

On February 28, 2009, Univision terminated the contracts of Enrique Gratas and Sergio Urquidi as part of corporate cutbacks enacted by parent company Univision Communications spurred by the Great Recession and a sharp downturn in advertising spending, which resulted in the layoffs of 300 employees (or 6% of its workforce), as well as the cancellation of the weekend editions of the newsmagazine Primer Impacto and its companion program Primer Impacto Extra. The late-night edition retained the Ultima Hora brand, though restoring a more traditional newscast format. On May 29, 2009, Enrique Teuteló – then the 11:00 p.m. anchor at Univision's Miami owned-and-operated station WLTV-DT – was named as Urquidi's replacement on the weekend editions of Última Hora and Noticiero Univision: Fin de Semana.

On March 3, 2011, Univision correspondent Martin Berlanga announced while substituting during that evening's edition of Ultima Hora that he would taking over as weekend anchor, replacing Enrique Teuteló, who was terminated by the news division the day prior (he would subsequently become morning co-anchor at the network's New York City owned-and-operated station WXTV-DT that June). Then on March 7, the network announced that Ilia Calderón would be named anchor of the late evening edition, which was retitled to its original name Noticiero Univision: Edición Nocturna, while retaining her duties as co-anchor of Primer Impacto. After a brief sabbatical from the weekend editions, Edna Schmidt was subsequently reassigned to weeknight co-anchor of the late newscast, before being let go by Noticias Univision after 19 years with the network on September 11, 2011, while in New York City to cover the ceremonies in remembrance of the 10th anniversary of the September 11 attacks.

On January 10, 2012, Univision removed Berlanga from his duties as anchor of the weekend newscasts after only ten months, effective after the January 15 edition of Fin de Semana, in which Berlanga did not indicate he would no longer anchor the weekend broadcasts; he was reassigned to a correspondent role, before Berlanga departed from the network after 17 years in March. ¡Despierta América! news co-anchor Félix de Bedout and longtime Televisa anchor/correspondent Lourdes Ramos (sister of main anchor Jorge Ramos) were concurrently named as his replacements; originally slated to start together on January 21, de Bedout debuted that week as solo anchor of the Saturday and Sunday editions, with Ramos joining him on the following week on January 28.

On January 23, 2012, the program introduced a new graphics package; it also relocated production of Noticiero Univision and Edición Nocturna to a new set branded as "[el] Centro de Noticias" ("[the] News Center"). The set was later updated to incorporate the new version of Univision's universal corporate logo, which debuted on January 1, 2013.

On April 23, 2012, former Telemundo anchor and special correspondent Enrique Acevedo joined Univision as a co-anchor of Noticiero Univision: Edición Nocturna (at which time, the late editions of the weekend broadcasts adopted that same title), alongside Ilia Calderón. In September 2012, Univision began to timeshift the Saturday early-evening editions of Noticiero Univision: Fin de Semana one hour earlier in the Eastern, Central and Mountain Time Zones (at 5:30 p.m. Eastern and 4:30 p.m. in the other two) since 2012, following the addition of soccer matches that precede Univision's prime time variety programming, on weeks in which those matches are scheduled to air within the newscast's regular 6:30/5:30 timeslot.

On October 1, 2012, the Academy of Television Arts and Sciences honored main anchors Jorge Ramos and Maria Elena Salinas with Lifetime Achievement Awards at the 33rd News & Documentary Emmy Awards for their journalistic work with Noticiero Univision and its parent news division. In September 2013, Univision moved production of its evening newscasts to the Univision NewsPort, based in a converted former office and warehouse complex near Univision's network headquarters in the Miami exurb of Doral, Florida that would also house the operations of Fusion, Univision's cable news venture with ABC News. The NewsPort houses five studios and five control rooms, one of which – located directly next to the newsroom offices – began housing the "Centro de Noticias" set in February 2015, following completion of the set's reassembly in the NewsPort building; all Noticias Univision broadcasts were conducted from the newsroom in the interim.

On July 14, 2014, Lourdes Ramos stepped down as weekend co-anchor to relocate to Madrid with her husband, although she would remain with Noticias Univision as a special correspondent. On September 3, 2014, Noticias Univision announced that Arantxa Loizaga (who joined the network in 2007 from San Antonio owned-and-operated station KWEX-DT, where she served as anchor of its 10:00 p.m. newscast and co-host of the community affairs magazine program, Portada San Antonio) would become co-anchor of Noticiero Univision: Fin de Semana, effective Saturday, September 6. In February 2021, Loizaga resigned from her position after being hired by Univision's competitor Telemundo, where she would host their new morning show, Hoy Día.

On December 8, 2017, Maria Elena Salinas stepped down as weekday anchor and departed Univision after 36 years with the network to focus on being an independent news producer with Ilia Calderón being named as co-anchor to the weekday newscasts with Jorge Ramos. Subsequently, Patricia Janiot joined Univision on January 29, 2018 to anchor Edición Nocturna after departing her previous position at CNN en Español)

== On-air staff ==
=== Current anchors ===
- Ilia Calderón – anchor, (2011–present)
- Paulina Sodi – anchor, Fin de semana (2021-2022), La Voz de la Mañana on TelevisaUnivision's streaming app VIX (2022-2026), Edición Nocturna (2026–present)
- Félix de Bedout – anchor, Fin de Semana (2012–present)
- Borja Voces – co-anchor, Edición Digital (2018–present)
- Carolina Sarassa – co-anchor, Edición Digital (2017–present)

=== Former on–air staff ===
- Guillermo Restrepo – anchor, Noticiero Nacional SIN (1981)
- Alfredo Alvarez Calderón - anchor, Noticiero Nacional SIN (1981-1987)
- Teresa Rodríguez - anchor, Noticiero Nacional SIN (1982-1987; later contributor to Noticiero Univision and anchor of Aquí y Ahora)
- Maity Interiano co-anchor (2022-2024)
- María Elena Salinas – anchor, (1987–2017; later independent news producer, also contributor at ABC News)
- Jorge Ramos – co-anchor, (1987–2024)
- María Celeste Arrarás – anchor, Fin de Semana (1990–1992; later as co-anchor & host of Noticias y más 1992–1994, followed by Primer Impacto 1994–2002, then on Telemundo as host of Al Rojo Vivo 2002–2020)
- María Antonieta Collins – anchor, Fin de Semana (1994–2005; later as host of Cada Dia con Maria Antonieta on Telemundo; now senior special correspondent for Noticias Univision and Fusion)
- Sergio Urquidi – anchor, Fin de Semana, Ultima Hora (1997-2009; later at KTVW in Phoenix 2013–2017, followed by KBNT in San Diego 2017–2019)
- Enrique Gratas – anchor, Ultima Hora (1999–2009; later at Estrella TV until his death in 2015)
- Edna Schmidt – anchor, Fin de Semana, Ultima Hora, and Edición Nocturna (2005–2011), later but terminated due to alcohol at WSNS-TV in Chicago in 2013
- Enrique Teutelo – anchor, Fin de Semana and Ultima Hora (2009-2011), later at WXTV-TV in New York City 2011–2014, now at KXTX-TV in Dallas, Texas
- Martin Berlanga – anchor, Fin de Semana and Ultima Hora (2011–2012; now at KTMD in Houston)
- Enrique Acevedo – anchor, Edición Nocturna (2012-2020; now anchor for En Punto on NMás)
- Lourdes Ramos – anchor, Fin de Semana (2012-2014; later special correspondent based out of Spain for Noticias Univision)
- Aranxta Loizaga – anchor, fin de Semana (2014-2021; later co-host of Hoy Día (2021-2022) on Telemundo), now at Noticias Telemundo en la Noche
- Patricia Janiot - anchor, Edición Nocturna (2018-2022)
- Leon Krauze – anchor, Edición Nocturna (2022-2023)
- Elián Zidán — anchor, Edición Nocturna (2023-2026)
