= Maity Interiano =

American journalist

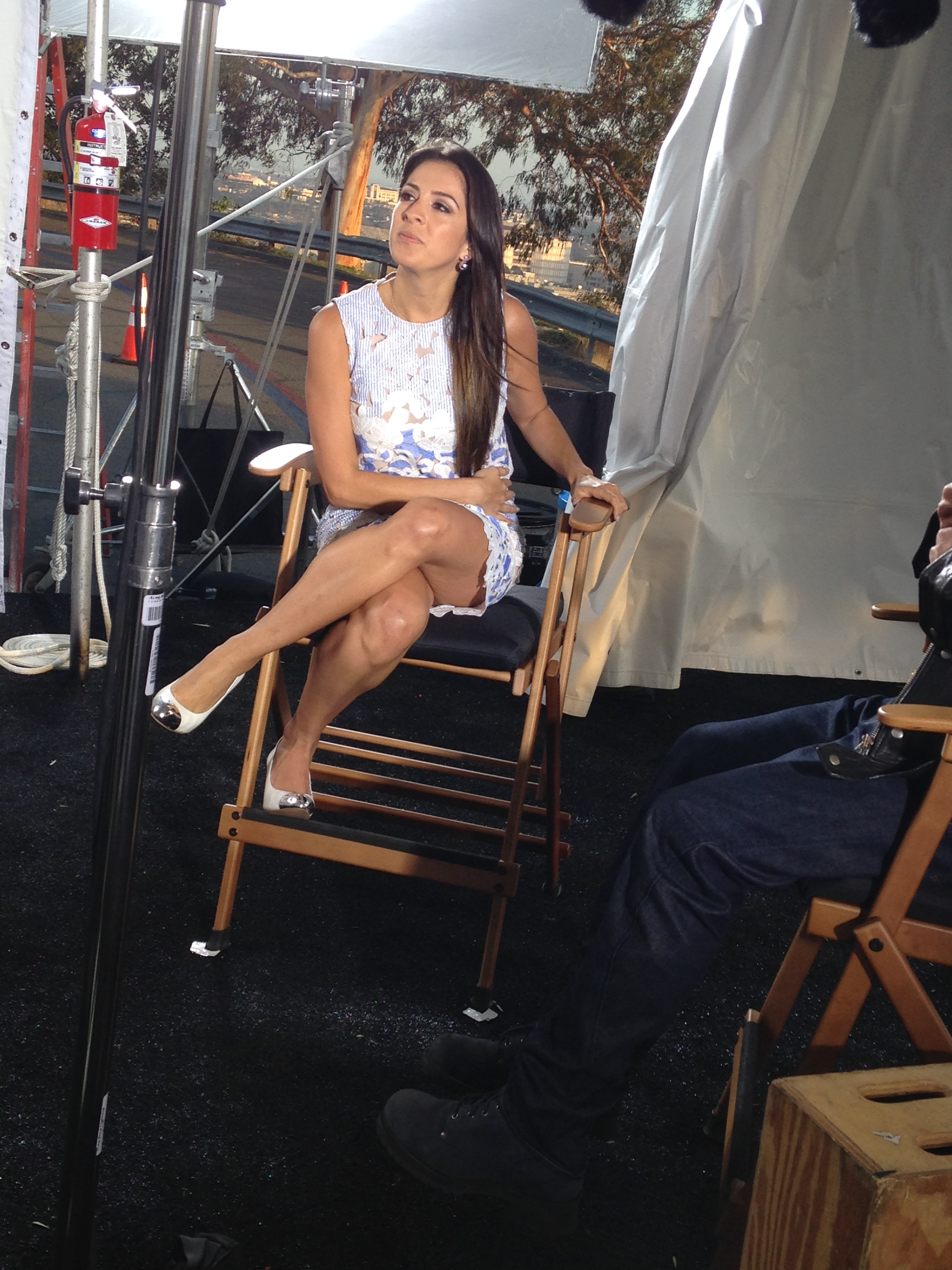
- Born: Gainesville, Florida, United States
- Education: Elon University, North Carolina
- Occupations: News anchor, "Noticiero Univision: Edición Nocturna"
- Years active: 2006-present
- Employer: Univision
- Known for: Despierta America
- Spouse: Anuar Zidan (2022-present)
- Awards: Emmy
- Website: http://www.maityonthego.com

Maity Interiano is an American journalist who has anchored for Univision network Noticiero Univision. Now she hosts and produces her own podcast available on YouTube and Spotify.

== General information ==
In the summer of 2005 she did an internship in the Spanish investigative show Aquí y Ahora in Univision Network and in the entertainment show Escandalo TV in Telefutura Network (now Unimas).

=== Career ===
After graduating in 2006 from Elon University in North Carolina she started to work as an associate producer and reporter in Escandalo TV, and was producing a weekly segment called "Vamos al Cine" until October 2011. Interiano has covered Premios Juventud, Premio lo Nuestro, Latin Grammy, Nuestra Belleza Latina since 2007. In April 2011 she covered the Royal Wedding of Prince William and Catherine Middleton in London for Escandalo TV y La Tijera in Telefutura Network (now Unimas). In 2012 she covered the Golden Globe for Tómbola, y the Oscars for Despierta América. In 2011 she participated in Teletón México in Telefutura Network and in 2012 in Teleton United States where she was accompanying the Teleton troop where actor Carlos Ponce was participating. From October 2011 to January 2012 she was in the show Tómbola on Telefutura network (now Unimas) as a reporter.

Maity was on the morning show Despierta America in Univision with entertainment coverage, with the "Vamonos al Cine" segment and interviewing international artists like Vin Diesel, Tony Bennett, Johnny Depp, Angelina Jolie, George Clooney, Salma Hayek, Sofia Vergara, Ricky Martin, Shakira, Alejandro Fernández, Antonio Banderas, Cameron Diaz and many more. In June 2013 she went to Brazil to do the entertainment notes that came out in Univision Deportes during the 15 days of the world Confederations Cup.

On January 17, 2022 Maity was left Despierta América to appointed as co anchor of Noticiero Univision Fin de Semanas with Felix De Bedout .

On February 8, 2023, Maity was named as anchor of Noticiero Univision: Edición Nocturna. She was started on February 13. She was sharing the desk with León Krauze, left on this year due to interview with Donald Trump. Then she was co-anchor with her brother in law, Elian Zidan.

On December 3, 2024, Maity was laid off due to TelevisaUnivision Inc. staffing and budgets cuts. She bid her farewell and seeing her in next chapter. Maity spent 17 years with Univision, shared on-camera how she started as an intern and landed her first job and built her entire broadcast career with the company.

=== Personal life ===
After breaking a relationship with somebody out of the public eye from Dominican Republic that she began dating from 2020, Maity began dating Anuar Zidan, a news producer from Univision Noticias and owner of Zidan Wines. They got engaged on February 11, 2023.

== Awards ==
On July 24 she won a Regional LA Area Emmy Award for hosting the Desfile de Las Rosas 2015 on Univision.
