= Al Punto =

- Final title logo
- Also known as: Al Punto con Jorge Ramos
- Genre: Sunday morning talk show
- Presented by: Jorge Ramos
- Country of origin: United States
- Original language: Spanish

Production
- Running time: 60 minutes

Original release
- Network: Univision
- Release: September 9, 2007 – December 15, 2024

Al Punto con Jorge Ramos (Spanish pronunciation: [al ˈpunto], To the Point with Jorge Ramos) is a weekly Sunday morning politics and public affairs show that aired on Univision from 2007 to 2024 and was hosted by Jorge Ramos.

As of 2024, Al Punto was the top-rated Sunday morning public affairs program on broadcast television among U.S. Hispanics.

== Format ==
The show consisted of a variety of interviews on issues of importance to the Latino community in the United States.

Each hour-long episode begins with Ramos delivering the show's catchphrase, "vamos al punto" (let's get to the point), before presenting the top story of the week.

The program aired nationally at 11:00 a.m. Eastern Time.

Al Punto regularly covers politics both in the United States and throughout Latin America. The show typically focuses on the major political stories of the week, featuring interviews with prominent politicians, analysts, and newsmakers. Segments also include discussions with artists, authors, and experts in their field on a wide range of topics.

During its final years, Al Punto highlighted up and coming Latino politicians in an ongoing segment titled "Nuevo Poder Latino". Featured guests are often the first Latinos elected to their positions and have included Rep. Monica De La Cruz (R-TX), Rep. Ritchie Torres (D-NY).

== Moderators ==
Journalist Jorge Ramos hosted the show since its inception. Ramos is the longest continuously-serving host of a nationally broadcast political Sunday show in the United States. Moderators who have guest-hosted the show include Ilia Calderón, Satcha Pretto, Enrique Acevedo, León Krauze, Félix de Bedout, Luis Carlos Vélez, and Elián Zidán.

== Al Punto Local ==
In addition to the national program, several TelevisaUnivision affiliates carry their own weekend political programs under the Al Punto title. These are Al Punto Florida, hosted by Ambrosio Hernández, Al Punto Dallas-Fort Worth, hosted by Ángel Pedrero, Al Punto California, and Al Punto Chicago, hosted by Enrique Rodríguez. These programs lead out of the national Al Punto broadcast, with the exception of Al Punto Chicago, which airs on Saturdays at 5 p.m. central time.

== History ==
Al Punto debuted on Univision on September 9, 2007 to coincide with the first Spanish-language U.S. presidential debate, hosted by Univision at the University of Miami on the same date.

During his opening monologue in Al Punto's inaugural broadcast, host Jorge Ramos explained the concept for the show, saying: "This is the political space that was so needed in Spanish, and we think it arrives just in time. To briefly explain what this show is about, if there is an issue that directly affects Hispanics in the U.S., or affects Latin America, we will discuss and analyze it here. We want to host newsmakers, the people who change our world. If they have something relevant or important to say, we want them to say it here first." Al Punto earned a total of six Emmy nominations, including in 2018 and 2022 for Outstanding Newscast or Newsmagazine in Spanish. Al Punto received seven nominations for GLAAD Media Awards for its coverage of LGBTQ issues and figures, most recently in 2024 in the "Outstanding TV Journalism" category.

In 2022, Al Punto was nominated for a Produ Award in the "Best Informative Program" category.

== Notable guests ==
Notable U.S. guests include Barack Obama, Mitt Romney, George W. Bush, Bill Clinton, Hillary Clinton, Sarah Palin, Harry Reid, Newt Gingrich, John McCain, Al Gore, George H. W. Bush, John Kerry, and Sonia Sotomayor.

Al Punto interviewed dozens of Latin American presidents and leaders. These include president of Colombia Juan Manuel Santos, president of Colombia Gustavo Petro (as a candidate in 2018), president of Mexico Andrés Manuel López Obrador, president of Mexico Enrique Peña Nieto, president of Mexico Felipe Calderón, former president of Mexico Carlos Salinas de Gortari, president of Guatemala Jimmy Morales, president of Honduras Manuel Zelaya, former president of Mexico Vicente Fox, president of Costa Rica Rodrigo Chaves Robles, former president of Ecuador Rafael Correa, former president of El Salvador Antonio Saca, and former president of Colombia Álvaro Uribe.

== Notable events ==
In August 2015 Ramos attended a presidential campaign event for Donald Trump in Dubuque, Iowa. When Ramos stood up to ask the then-candidate about his plan to deport millions of immigrants, Trump had Ramos physically escorted away by his security detail. Ramos was later able to reenter the press conference and ask a series of questions.

In February 2019 Ramos and a team from Univision traveled to Caracas to interview Venezuelan leader Nicolas Maduro. Maduro ended the interview early after becoming upset about the questions. According to Ramos, Maduro "didn't like the things we were asking him about the lack of democracy in Venezuela, the torture and the political prisoners." The Venezuelan regime confiscated the Univision production team's equipment, including their phones and camera memory cards. The incident caused the U.S. State Department to call for Ramos' release, warning "the world is watching." The production team, including Ramos, was detained for approximately two hours and later deported.

On three occasions, most recently in February 2024, Ramos traveled to Mexico City to question President López Obrador during the Mexican leader's daily press conference. The extensive back and forth discussions generally focus on the country's high crime rate. As he often does with journalists who are critical of his policies, President López Obrador has attacked Ramos by name on dozens of occasions during his official daily press conferences.
