= Eliott Rodriguez =

American journalist and political candidate

- Born: June 6, 1956 (age 70); New York City, New York, U.S.
- Education: Miami Dade College (AA); University of Miami (BA)
- Political party: Democratic
- Spouse(s): María Elena Salinas (m. 1993–2007) Brenda Rodriguez (m. 2012)
- Children: 6

Eliott Rodriguez is an American journalist, former television news anchor, and former political candidate. The son of Cuban immigrants, Rodriguez was in journalism for almost five decades including 25 years at CBS News Miami. He won three Emmy Awards, four Edward R. Murrow Awards, and a Silver Circle Award from the National Academy of Television Arts and Sciences.

In 2026, Rodriguez entered politics as a Democrat and was the party's nominee for Florida's 27th congressional district.

== Early life and education ==
Rodriguez was born in New York to parents who immigrated from Cuba. His mother worked as a seamstress in New York's garment district, while his father owned a grocery store in the Bronx. His family moved to Miami when he was 12, and he went to Shenandoah Junior High School and Immaculata-LaSalle High School.

Rodriguez attended the Kendall campus of Miami Dade College, where he initially planned to pursue art before becoming involved with the Catalyst, the student newspaper for the campus. He joined the newspaper as a cartoonist in 1974 and was the features editor, assistant news editor, and news editor. He graduated from the University of Miami in Coral Gables, Florida.

== Journalism career ==
Rodriguez began his professional journalism career in 1978 as a reporter for the Miami News, (now defunct) transitioning into television journalism in 1980. He worked for The Miami Herald and then held reporting positions as well as being an anchor at WTVJ in Miami, WPVI-TV in Philadelphia, and WPLG in Miami. After approximately two and a half years at WTVJ, Rodriguez left Miami for WPVI, where he worked as a reporter and anchored the morning news. In 1987, he came back to Miami to join WPLG as a weekend co-anchor and general assignment reporter. He remained at WPLG until 1998.

Rodriguez joined WFOR-TV, the CBS station in Miami, in 1999. During his career he covered major local, national and international stories including the Mariel boatlift, the Liberty City riots, the U.S. invasion of Panama, the 1985 Mexico City earthquake, Hurricane Andrew, and the Surfside condominium collapse. His international reporting included assignments in Cuba and at the Vatican. In 2002, he interviewed Cuban leader Fidel Castro, and later reported from Cuba during President Barack Obama's 2016 visit and after Castro's death.

In October 2014, Rodriguez moderated a televised Florida gubernatorial debate between Republican Governor Rick Scott and Democratic former governor Charlie Crist. The debate received national attention after Scott initially refused to take the stage because Crist had placed a small electric fan beneath his lectern, an incident widely referred to as "Fangate". The Miami New Times cited Rodriguez's handling of the debate when it named him the city's Best TV News Anchor in 2015. Rodriguez remained with CBS Miami until December 2025. His final broadcast was on December 19, 2025.

== Awards and recognition ==
Miami New Times named Rodriguez Best TV News Anchor in both 2006 and 2015. By 2025, his professional honors included three Emmy Awards, four Edward R. Murrow Awards, and the Silver Circle Award, which recognizes extended service in television broadcasting. In 2006, he was inducted into the Miami Dade College Alumni Hall of Fame in the television journalism category.

== 2026 congressional campaign ==
In March 2026, Rodriguez announced that he would run as a Democrat for Florida's 27th congressional district, seeking the seat held by Republican incumbent María Elvira Salazar. Both Rodriguez and Salazar are Cuban Americans and former television journalists. Rodriguez cited Miami's affordability crisis and the Trump administration's immigration policies as major reasons for him entering the race.

During the campaign, Rodriguez advocated for increased federal support for affordable housing and restoration of subsidies for health insurance obtained through the Affordable Care Act. He called for greater congressional scrutiny of federal immigration enforcement and criticized Salazar's immigration legislation as not providing a pathway to citizenship. As of July 2026, the two candidates in the Democratic primary are Rodriguez and former federal prosecutor Robin Peguero. The Democratic primary was held on August 18. During the campaign, the nonpartisan Cook Political Report moved its assessment of the district from a safe Republican seat to "Likely Republican".

== Personal life ==
Rodriguez was formerly married to journalist and Univision anchor María Elena Salinas. They have two daughters.
