= Mariana Atencio =

Venezuelan-born American journalist (born 1984)

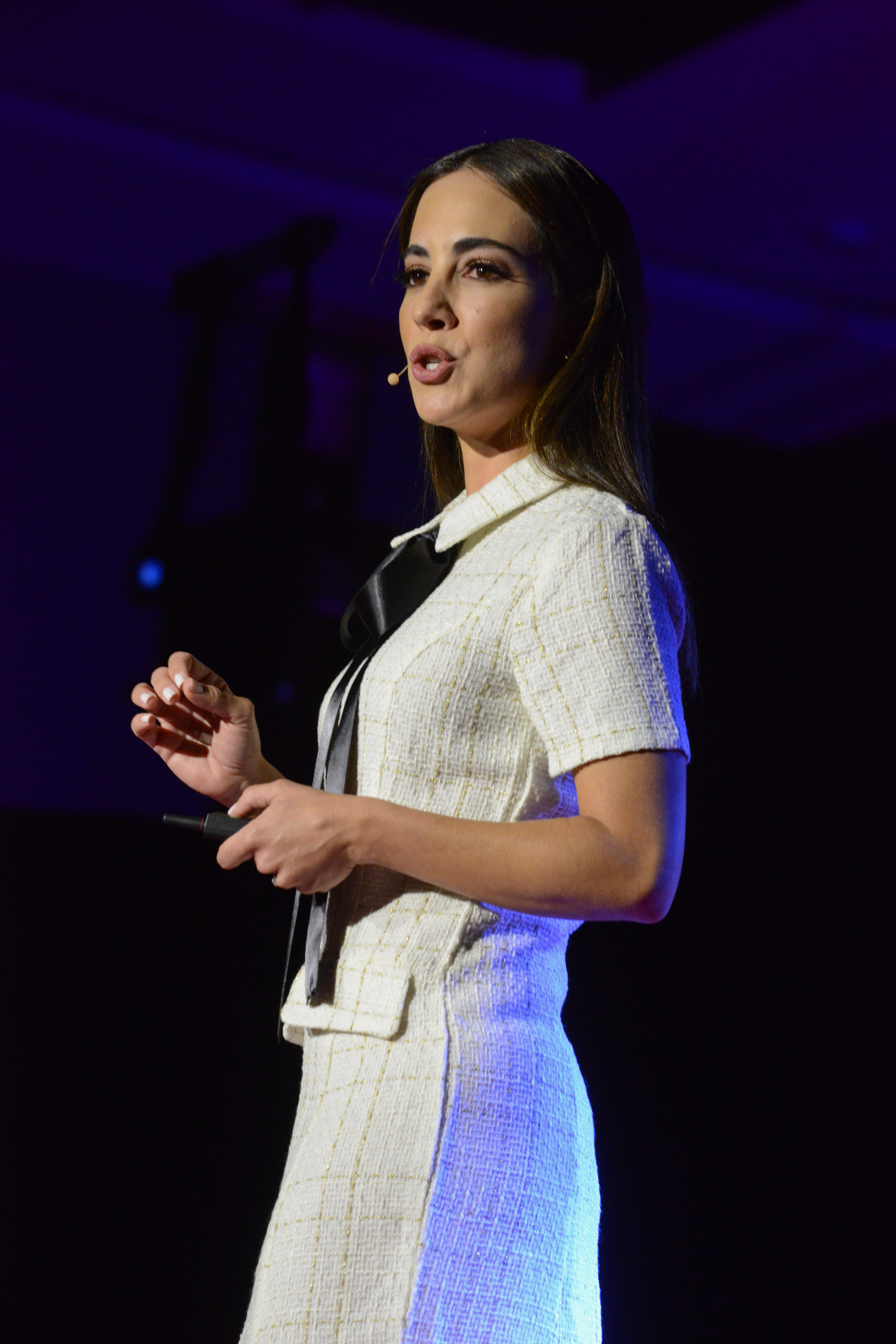
- Atencio in 2018
- Born: Mariana del Carmen Atencio Cervoni; April 2, 1984 (age 42); Caracas, Venezuela
- Education: Columbia University Graduate School of Journalism (MA); Universidad Católica Andrés Bello, Caracas (BA)
- Occupations: Journalist and author
- Spouse: José Antonio Torbay (m. 2015; div. 2020)
- Awards: Peabody Award, Investigative Reporters and Editors Award, Gracie Award, National Association of Hispanic Journalists Presidential Award
- Website: www.golikemariana.com

Mariana Atencio (born April 2, 1984) is an American journalist, television host, author and speaker who was formerly a correspondent for NBC News. Atencio is a native of Venezuela and holds a master's degree from the Columbia University Graduate School of Journalism. In 2020, Atencio cofounded GoLike, a multimedia production company.

== Early life and education ==
Mariana del Carmen Atencio was born in Caracas, Venezuela to Álvaro Atencio and Diana Atencio. She is the oldest of three children.

Atencio has a Bachelor's degree in Communications from the Universidad Católica Andrés Bello in Caracas. In 2008, she emigrated to the United States after being awarded a scholarship from Columbia University Graduate School of Journalism, where she graduated with a Master's degree. Ten years later, Atencio received the First Decade Award from Columbia University for her work as a journalist.

== Career ==
In 2009, Atencio started her journalism career as a reporter at Impremedia's El Diario/La Prensa in New York City.

=== Univision and Fusion (2011-2016) ===
Atencio began working as a guest anchor and correspondent for Univision News in 2011. She covered the 2012 presidential election for the network’s morning program Despierta America and its evening newscast Noticiero Univision.

In 2012, she began working as an investigative reporter at Univision. Atencio was one of five reporters who worked on the Peabody Award winning documentary Rapido y Furioso (Fast & Furious) for which they received an Investigative Reporters and Editors Award. She also served as a reporter for the network’s Investigative Unit. In 2013 she was part of a five-person reporting team that won Univision's first Peabody Award for "Fast and Furious: Arming the Enemy," an hour-long investigation on the gun-walking scandal known as Operation Fast and Furious.

In 2014, Atencio received a Gracie Award from the Alliance for Women in Media for her work on the Univision documentary, "Pressured: Freedom of the Press," which she reported on and wrote.

Atencio became an anchor for the network’s The Morning Show, a two-hour program featuring a mix of news, feature stories and live interviews. She anchored The Morning Show on Fusion TV channel until its cancellation in 2014. She was the reporter for Fusion's National Headliner Award-winning segment, "Unearthing the Tomb." Her report entitled, “Mexico Massacres,” received recognition from The National Association of Hispanic Journalists.

She has also served as a field correspondent. Atencio led the network’s on-the-ground coverage of the 2014 protests in Venezuela from where she also contributed to ABC News. She has covered the shooting death of Michael Brown in Ferguson, the Umbrella Revolution in Hong Kong, and the 2014 Iguala mass kidnapping, where 43 students went missing in Mexico.

In 2015, she was a reporter in McAllen, Texas for ABC News’ virtual town hall with Pope Francis ahead of his first visit to the United States. She interacted with Pope Francis and translated on live television for recent immigrants who wanted to ask the pope questions.

In March 2016, she was part of the anchor-team for Univision and The Washington Post’s debate between Democratic candidates Hillary Clinton and Bernie Sanders.

=== NBC News (2016-2020) ===
Atencio made the crossover from Spanish to English-language network news in September 2016 when she became a correspondent for NBC. She was the only Latina correspondent on the cable network.

Atencio specialized in covering the U.S. Latino community and immigration, and doing live on-air translations from Spanish. She reported on notable stories such as the Central American migrant caravans, the child separation crisis at the border and the ICE raids across several Mississippi chicken plants that led to the arrest of 680 undocumented immigrants.

Atencio's live interviews with migrant mothers during the Trump administration's family separation policy and her coverage of the border were nominated for two national Emmy Awards.

During the 2020 presidential race, the 2018 midterms and the 2016 presidential campaign, she reported on Hispanic voters across the country. In 2019, she was part of a team of NBC reporters, known as Road Warriors, who were awarded the First Amendment Clarity Award for their coverage of the 2018 midterm elections.

Atencio covered major natural disasters including the earthquake in Mexico, as well as the aftermath of Hurricanes Maria, Harvey, Florence, Michael, and Dorian.

=== Other work (2020-present) ===
Atencio was a 2021 Henry Crown Fellow at the Aspen Institute. In November 2021, she was named as an official spokesperson for the future National Museum of the American Latino in Washington D.C.

In 2022, she released the true crime investigative podcast series Lost in Panama, which documented the disappearance of Kris Kremers and Lisanne Froon, two Dutch tourists who went missing on a hiking trail. During the investigation, Atencio discovered more than 50 additional cases of women disappearing in the same area.

== Publications ==
On June 11, 2019, HarperCollins published Atencio’s first book Perfectly You: Embracing the Power of Being Real, in English and Spanish. The book is self-help and part autobiography.

== Personal life ==
In 2020, Atencio became a U.S. citizen. As of 2019, Atencio lives in Miami and New York City.

Atencio's father died in February 2018 due to complications from pneumonia after contracting the flu. She chronicled his health crisis in the hospital in Caracas and the lack of basic medical supplies in Venezuela as a result of the humanitarian crisis.

== Bibliography ==
- Atencio, Mariana (2019). Perfectly You: Embracing the Power of Being Real. W Publishing Group. ISBN 9780785228387. OCLC 1080997518.
