= María Antonieta Collins =

Mexican journalist and author

María Antonieta Collins Flores
- Born: María Antonieta Collins Flores; 12 May 1952 (age 72); Coatzacoalcos, Veracruz, Mexico
- Other names: La Chaparrona
- Occupations: Journalist; hostess; writer

María Antonieta Collins Flores (born 12 May 1952) is a Mexican journalist, television host and author. She is the winner of four Emmy Awards and the Edward Murrow Award.

== Biography ==
Collins became known to viewers in her native Mexico as a reporter of "Televisa 24 horas" (1974), Noticiero con Jacobo Zabludovsky. In 1979 Collins was sent by Televisa as their first correspondent in California where she began as a general assignment journalist also covering baseball in the Major Leagues with the San Diego Padres and the Los Angeles Dodgers, job she did until 1986. Later that year, Collins was transferred to Spanish International Network (SIN) the network later named Univision. In eighteen years in Univision Network, Collins was well known for her job as a Mexico Correspondent, Texas Correspondent, and International Correspondent.

After Univision, Collins went to Telemundo where she hosted the morning show "Cada Dia".

In 1993, she was appointed as the successor of María Celeste Arrarás as the weekend anchor of Noticiero Univision, covering Jorge Ramos and María Elena Salinas while they were out.

In 1999, Collins convinced her friend Juanita Castro, the younger sister of Fidel and Raúl Castro, to co-write and publish Juanita's autobiography in Spanish edition: My brothers Fidel and Raúl, the secret story. The book was finally published in October 2009.

In 2000, was named Senior Correspondent for the news magazine "Aqui y Ahora" position that with Noticiero Univision fin de semana hold it until she left the network in August 2005.

Her 2003 book, Cuando el monstruo despierta, spoke about domestic violence. Writing this book was an emotional experience for Collins, as she revealed that her own daughter, Antonietta Collins, had been a victim of domestic violence by a former boyfriend.

In an article in People en Español (March 2008), Collins announced that she would be leaving Telemundo when her contract expired in August 2008 and that she wished to return to anchoring news.

She also writes a weekly editorial column for "El Sol de Mexico" network and its sixty newspapers in Mexico.

== Personal life ==
Collins and María Celeste Arrarás are both animal rights activists.

She studies and plays (classical) piano.

Collins underwent plastic surgery in 2004 and has spoken extensively about it.

== Selected publications ==
- Dietas y Recetas de María Antonieta (Grijalbo/Random House 2001)
- ¿Quién dijo que no se puede? (Grijalbo/Random House 2002)
- Cuando el monstruo despierta (Grijalbo/Random House 2003)
- En el nombre de comprar, firmar...y no llorar (Rayo/HarperCollins 2004)
- Cómo lidiar con los ex hombres, mujeres, y fantasmas del pasado (Rayo/HarperCollins 2006)
- "Dijiste que me querías" : cómo sobrellevar lo impensable (Rayo/HarperCollins 2007)
- Porque quiero, porque puedo y porque me da la gana (Rayo 2009)
- ¿Muerta?... ¡Pero de la risa! (Vintage Español 2014)
