= Edna Schmidt =

American journalist and news anchor (1969–2021)

- Born: August 8, 1969; New York City, U.S
- Died: June 24, 2021 (aged 51); Guaynabo, Puerto Rico
- Occupations: Journalist; news anchor

Edna Schmidt (August 8, 1969 – June 24, 2021) was a journalist who was a news anchor for Noticiero Univision Edición Nocturna. She was of Puerto Rican descent, and covered the September 11 attacks in New York City, the panic caused by the anthrax threat, and the execution of Oklahoma bomber Timothy McVeigh.

== Early life and education ==
Schmidt's parents moved from Puerto Rico to Manhattan, New York City, where she was born. After receiving her primary and secondary education, Schmidt enrolled in college, where she majored in journalism.

== Career ==
Schmidt moved to Puerto Rico, where she started her career as a newscaster for WSJN-TV (Channel 24). In 1992, she went to Chicago, where she was offered a job at WGBO-TV (Channel 66) a local Spanish language station.

=== Telefutura (2002-09) ===
She lived in Chicago for 10 years before she was offered the position of anchorwoman in Telefutura, a division of Univision Communications, Inc., the leading Spanish-language media company in the U.S.

In April 2002, Schmidt accepted the offer and together with her husband moved to Miami, Florida where Telefutura has its headquarters. Schmidt was the inaugural anchor of "Noticias al Minuto" (Latest Minute News) until 2009, when she was promoted to Noticiero Univision: Fin de Semana. Among the notable events that Schmidt has covered are the September 11 attacks on the World Trade Center in 2001, the panic caused by the Anthrax threat, and the execution of Oklahoma bomber Timothy McVeigh.

=== Univision (2009-2011) ===
She was working towards a master's degree in journalism at Iowa State University. She was named the National Godmother of the Puerto Rican Day Parade in New York City June 10, 2007.

After 19 years of serving as anchor woman for Univision's weekend newscasts, Noticiero Univision: Fin de Semana, María Antonieta Collins decided to leave Univision, thereby leaving the anchor chair vacated and would be filled in by substitutes notably Schmidt, Ilia Calderón, and Martín Berlanga.

From September 2005 to February 2011, Edna Schmidt with Enrique Teutelo co-anchored Univision's weekend newscasts at 6:30pm and 11:30pm weekends. Edna Schmidt and Enrique Teutelo were praised by Hispanicmarketweekly.com, saying that Teutelo and Schmidt gave a fresh face to the news weekends because they often alternated in the delivery of the news. She was however replaced with Ilia Calderón in early March 2011.

On April 4, 2011 she returned to deliver the news at 11:30 pm co-anchoring with Ilia Calderón on Última Hora, now under its new name of Noticiero Univision: Edición Noctura (Evening Edition).

On July 1, 2011, Schmidt announced via Twitter that she was subbing as news anchor for ¡Despierta América! for Sascha Pretto but that she would return to Noticias Univisión, where she stayed until September 2011, when she was let go.

== Fashion sense ==
Schmidt was known for having a keen sense for fashion and quality attire while presenting Univision. As an example, viewers would always notice a broach, a flower or texture on her outfits.

== Death ==
On June 24, 2021, Univision reported that she had died at age 51; her cause of death was not indicated.

== See also ==
- German immigration to Puerto Rico
- List of Puerto Ricans
