= Enrique Acevedo =

Mexican journalist

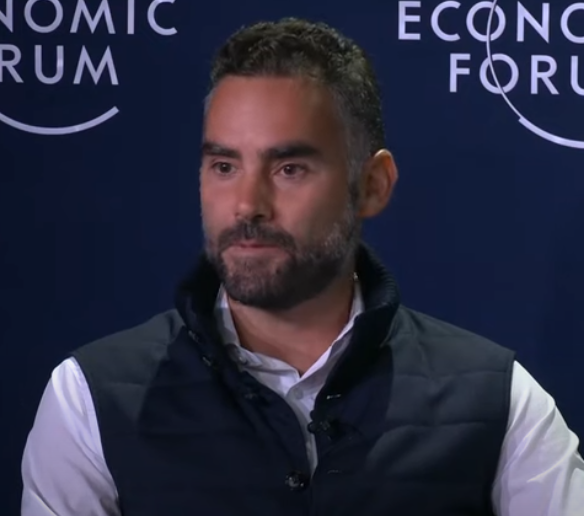
- At the 2022 World Economic Forum
- Born: Enrique Acevedo Quintana; March 6, 1978 (age 48); Mexico City, Mexico
- Education: Columbia University / Tec de Monterrey (ITESM) Campus Monterrey
- Occupations: Journalist, CBS News
- Known for: Correspondent at 60 Minutes 60 in 6 News Anchor at Univision News Correspondent Mexican Journalists Hispanic Journalists

Enrique Acevedo (born March 6, 1978) is a Mexican journalist who has been anchoring Televisa's flagship newscast En punto since 2023. He previously served as correspondent for CBS News where he reported across multiple broadcasts and platforms on a wide range of topics including the 2020 Presidential Election, the U.S. troop withdrawal from Afghanistan, and the violence against journalists in Mexico. In 2020, he became the first Latino correspondent in the history of the 60 Minutes franchise, working for 60 Minutes Plus.

== Education ==
Acevedo has a master's degree in journalism from Columbia University Graduate School of Journalism. He was a Pritzker Fellow at the University of Chicago Institute of Politics in 2019.

== Career ==
Starting in 2012 he was promoted to Noticiero Univision: Edicion Nocturna. He left the position in 2017. Continued working with Univision til 2020.

During the 2016 presidential cycle, he co-moderated Univision's Democratic Debate and led the network's electoral coverage alongside Maria Elena Salinas and Jorge Ramos.

On November 9th, 2023, TelevisaUnivision executives brought in Acevedo to interview former President Donald Trump from his Mar-a-Lago residence in Florida. The interview, “Donald Trump: La Entrevista”, was aired the day after the third Republican primary debate, in which Trump did not participate and instead held a rally in Hialeah, Florida. The interview was simulcast throughout the U.S. on Univision in Spanish and its sister channel UNIMÁS and on ViX’s news channel, Noticias Univision 24/7, in English with Spanish subtitles. Trump spoke to Acevedo about his plans for the future, his legal troubles, and the state of the nation, among other topics.

== Recognitions and studies ==
He has been recognized as one of the "Top Latinos in American Newsrooms" by The Huffington Post and a "Global Media Leader" by the World Economic Forum.

== Personal life ==
On November 29, 2014, he married Florentina Romo in San Miguel de Allende.

He is fluent in French.

== Works ==
- Essential: Being Latino and Indispensable in America. Harper, 2026. ISBN 978-0063343047

Media offices
Preceded by Denise Maerker	Televisa Nightly News Anchor; January 11, 2023 – present	Incumbent
