= Martin Berlanga =

Mexican news anchor

- Born: Tijuana, Mexico
- Occupation: News Anchor
- Employer: Telemundo Houston

Martin Berlanga is a Mexican news anchor for Telemundo Houston. He used to be anchor correspondent for Noticiero Univision weekends and the news segments on Univision's early morning program, Tu DesayunoAlegre.

Spouse: Iris Salinas (1999 - 2005)

Children: Bruno Berlanga and Dante Berlanda

== Career ==
Berlanga has been anchor and correspondent “Noticiero Univision” (Univision News) and Noticiero Univision: Edicion Nocturna (Univision News: Late Night Edition), the primetime newsmagazine program Aquí y Ahora (Here and Now), the morning show Despierta América (Wake-up America) and the political show Al Punto (To the Point). He also presented the news segments on Univision’s early morning program Tu Desayuno Alegre (Your Happy Breakfast). He had been was the Univision Network news correspondent based in San Antonio, Texas.

During his years in broadcast journalism, Berlanga has covered important news stories such as the U.S. and Mexican presidential elections, the September 11 attacks in 2001, crash of a passenger planes, and the trial and execution of Timothy McVeigh in Oklahoma. In addition, he has reported on hurricanes, earthquakes, prisoner executions in Texas and Indiana, the arrival of Taliban prisoners to the Guantánamo Bay detention camp, and the crash of the Space Shuttle Columbia, among others. As a news correspondent in Texas, Berlanga also regularly covered the daily plight of immigrants who cross the border illegally from Mexico.

Before moving to the United States, Berlanga had a successful career in Mexico as a television news anchor, host and producer of youth-oriented shows, and later as a news anchor, radio announcer and producer. In 1996, he became a local reporter and weekend news anchor for Houston’s KXLN-Univision 45.

Born in Tijuana, Mexico, Berlanga holds a Bachelor of Science degree in communication sciences from the Universidad Autónoma de Coahuila.
