= Aquí y Ahora (TV program) =

- Presented by: Ilia Calderón
- Country of origin: United States
- Original language: Spanish

Production
- Executive producer: Jairo Marin
- Running time: 60 Minutes
- Production company: Univision Communications

Original release
- Network: Univision
- Release: March 30, 1998 – December 29, 2024

Aquí y Ahora (Here and Now) is an American Spanish-language newsmagazine that aired on the Univision television network from March 30, 1998 to December 29, 2024. It was hosted by Ilia Calderón and presented stories that document the Latino experience in the United States. In 2012, the show achieved national attention as it aired an investigation on the Fast and Furious scandal, for which it later received a Peabody Award.

== Broadcast history ==
The show aired originally as a quarterly special edition and began weekly broadcasts on March 30, 2000, with Teresa Rodríguez, María Elena Salinas and Jorge Ramos as co-anchors. It originally aired on Thursdays at 10:00 PM Eastern Time and Pacific Time/9:00 PM Central Time. In 2009 or 2010, the timeslot changed to Tuesdays at 10:00 PM Eastern and Pacific Time/9:00 PM Central Time. In 2012, Univision announced the show would air on Sundays at 7:00 PM Eastern and Pacific Time/6:00 PM Central Time.

== Special editions ==
=== Rápido y Furioso: Armando al enemigo ===
In-depth investigation on failed Operation Fast and Furious that revealed how guns that crossed the border as part of a government undercover operation caused dozens of deaths in Mexico.

=== El Chapo Guzmán, el eterno fugitivo ===
Recounts the story of one of the world’s most wanted fugitives Joaquín "El Chapo" Guzmán at the juncture of his latest capture by the Mexican authorities in February 2014. The special set a record breaking weekly performance with over 1.6 million viewers.

== Journalism awards ==
- 2005 GLAAD Award, Mejor Segmento Televisivo de Revista periodística en Español, Muxes
- 2007 NAHJ, National Association of Hispanic Journalists Award
- 2008 GLAAD Award, Mejor Segmento Televisivo de Revista periodística en Español, La historia de Angie Zapata
- 2013 Peabody Award, Operation fast and Furious (Univision Investiga)
- 2013 The Gracie Awards – Alliance for Women in Media, TV Outstanding Magazine, The Woman in the Mirror
- 2013 GLAAD Award, Mejor Segmento Televisivo de Revista periodística en Español, La vida en rosa
- 2014 GLAAD Award, Mejor Segmento Televisivo de Revista periodística en Español, Rompiendo Estereotipos
- 2015 GLAAD Award, Mejor Segmento Televisivo de Revista periodística en Español, En Cuerpo Ajeno
- 2014 Emmy Award Outstanding Coverage of a Breaking News Story in Spanish, La Masacre de Iguala
- 2014 Emmy Award Outstanding Investigative Journalism in Spanish, Los Nuevos Narcotesoros (Univision Investiga)
- 2015 Emmy Award Outstanding Investigative Journalism in Spanish, El Chapo: El Eterno Fugitivo
- 2017 Emmy Award Outstanding Coverage of a Breaking News Story in Spanish, La Recaptura de El Chapo
- 2018 Emmy Award Outstanding News Magazine in Spanish, En la boca del Lobo
- 2018 Emmy Award Outstanding Coverage of a Breaking News Story in Spanish, Terror en Las Vegas
