= Ilia Calderón =

Colombian journalist (born 1972)

Ilia Calderón Chamat
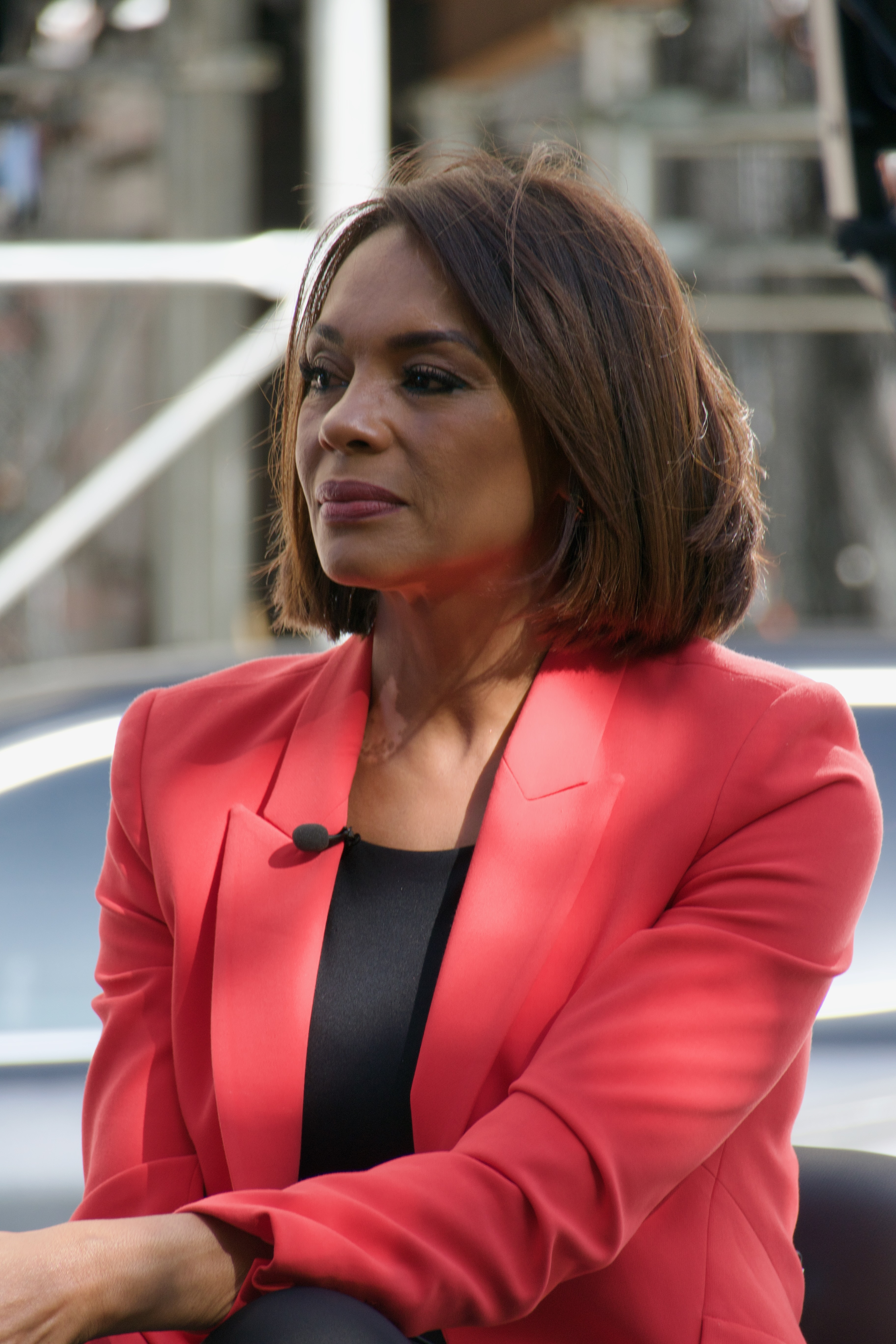
- Ilia Calderón in 2024.
- Born: May 15, 1972 (age 54); Chocó, Colombia
- Education: Universidad de Antioquia
- Occupations: News anchor, Aquí y Ahora, Noticiero N+ Univision

Ilia Calderón Chamat (born 1972) is a Colombian journalist. Born in Chocó, Calderón currently works as the news anchor for Univision's national evening newscast Noticiero N+ Univision. She is also the presenter of the Univision weekly newsmagazine Aquí y Ahora.

== Education and early career ==
She majored in social work at Universidad de Antioquia. She presented several news shows, first on regional channel Teleantioquia in 1994, and subsequently on national television channel Noticiero CM&. Three years later, she went to Telemundo, where she hosted the Noticiero Telemundo weekend edition and a segment on the morning show Cada Día con María Antonieta.

In 2005, she underwent a successful operation to remove a uterine tumor.

In March 2007, she left Telemundo to host Univision the Primer Impacto weekend edition. In 2008 Primer Impacto host Fernando del Rincón was fired. Ilia became a regular co-host on the weekday edition, with Barbara Bermudo leaving the weekend edition to Satcha Pretto.

In 2010, while still co-anchoring Primer Impacto, she became the co-anchor of the weekday edition of Univision's late evening newscast Noticiero N+ Univision Edición Nocturna.

On June 3, 2011, it was announced that Pamela Silva would be joining Primer Impacto, replacing Ilia Calderón, who stayed on Noticiero Univision Edición Nocturna.

Calderón won an Emmy Award for her 2017 interview of Ku Klux Klan imperial wizard Christopher Barker. In December 2017, she replaced former co-anchor Maria Elena Salinas on Noticiero Univision, becoming the first Afro-Latina to anchor a weekday primetime newscast for a major broadcast network in the United States.

In 2019, the Carnegie Corporation of New York named her one of their 2019 Great Immigrants Honorees.

On March 15, 2020, she co-hosted the eleventh Democratic presidential debate on CNN with Jake Tapper and Dana Bash.

In 2020, she published her book My Time to Speak: Reclaiming Ancestry and Confronting Race, discussing her experiences as an Afro-Latina and the challenges in representing the Afro-Latina communities in Spanish.

In July 2023 her show Señales del Crimen con Ilia Calderón (Signs of Crime with Ilia Calderón) made its debut on the streaming platform ViX.

On September 27, 2023, she co-hosted the second Republican presidential debate on Fox Business with Stuart Varney and Dana Perino.

On October 28, 2024, Univision announced that Calderón would become the first solo anchor of Noticiero N+ Univision following the departure of Jorge Ramos. Calderón is the first Black Latina to helm an evening news show.

== Personal life ==
She is married to Eugene Jang; they have one daughter named Anna Janglia-calderon.

== See also ==
- List of Afro-Latinos
