= KTMD =

Television station in Galveston, Texas

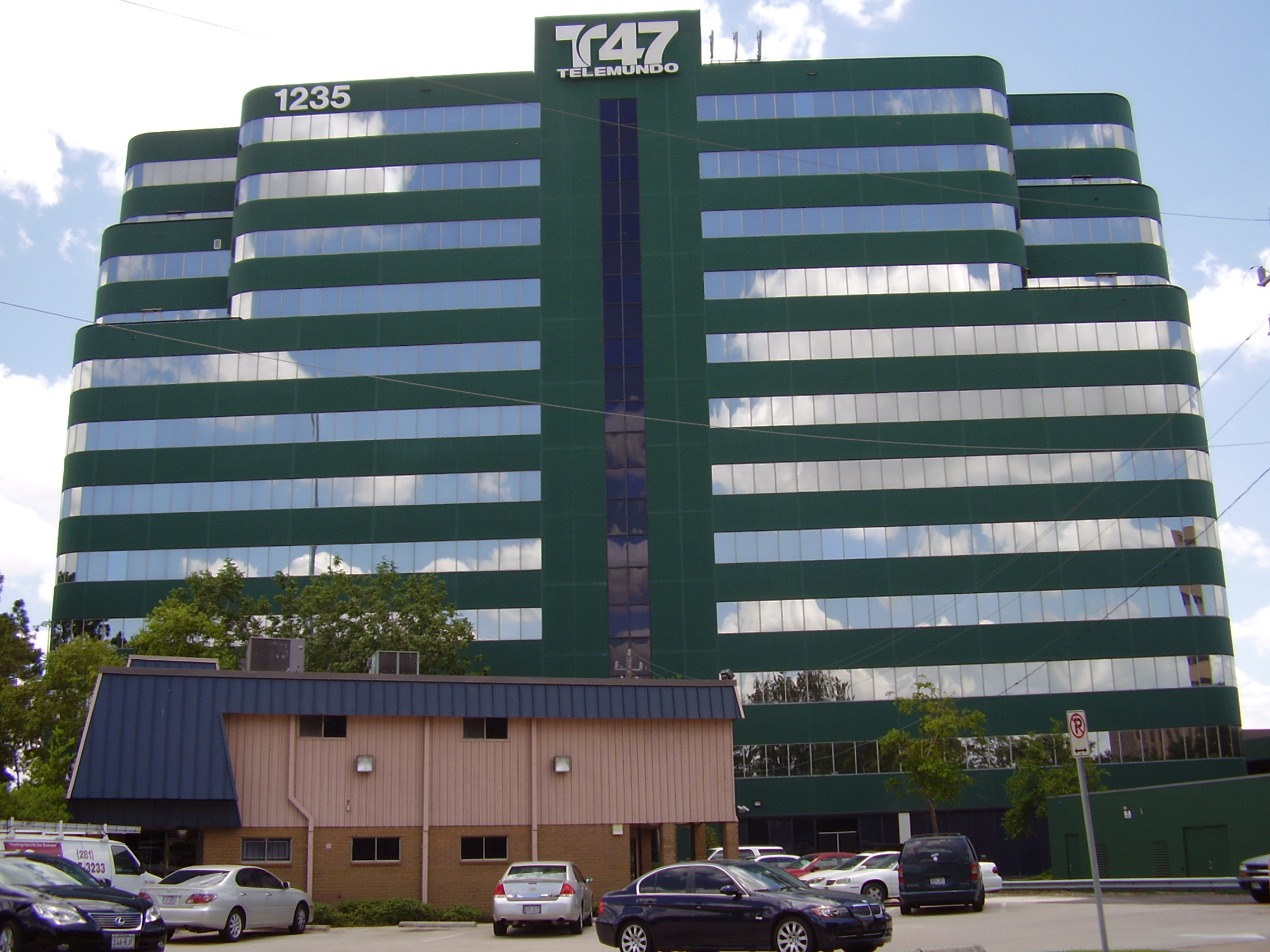
- KTMD's offices in Houston.
- Galveston–Houston, Texas; United States
- City: Galveston, Texas
- Channels: Digital: 22 (UHF); Virtual: 47
- Branding: Telemundo Houston

Programming
- Affiliations: 47.1: Telemundo; for others, see § Subchannels

Ownership
- Owner: Telemundo Station Group; (NBC Telemundo License LLC)

History
- Founded: December 7, 1987
- First air date: February 1, 1988
- Former channel numbers: Analog: 48 (UHF, 1987–2002), 47 (UHF, 2002–2009); Digital: 48 (UHF, until 2019)
- Call sign meaning: Telemundo

Technical information
- Licensing authority: FCC
- Facility ID: 64984
- ERP: 1,000 kW
- HAAT: 597 m (1,959 ft)
- Transmitter coordinates: 29°34′16″N 95°30′38″W

Links
- Public license information: Public file; LMS
- Website: www.telemundohouston.com

KTMD (channel 47) is a television station licensed to Galveston, Texas, United States, serving as the Houston area outlet for the Spanish-language network Telemundo. Owned and operated by NBCUniversal's Telemundo Station Group, the station maintains studios on I-610 (North Loop) and Bevis Street on Houston's northwest side, and its transmitter is located near Missouri City, in unincorporated northeastern Fort Bend County.

== History ==
Beginning in 1978, several applications were made for what was originally channel 48 in Galveston. Proposals were made by the Old Time Religion Hour (OTRH), Alden Communications of Texas, and Bluebonnet Television, a local consortium that included the former general manager of KDOG-TV in Houston as well as two Hispanic principals. However, after the FCC decided to grant the permit to Bluebonnet in 1983, OTRH and Alden jointly lodged an appeal. The primary issue that had cost them the permit was twofold. A television studio had been donated to the group, which aired the program of the same name, in Friendswood, near Houston, and FCC administrative law judge Joseph P. Gonzalez found that OTRH had failed to show good cause for the station's main studio to not be located in Galveston.

After the FCC reaffirmed the award of the construction permit to Bluebonnet in 1987, KTMD began broadcasting on February 1, 1988, as a Telemundo affiliate. Broadcasting from the former tower of KUHT, the station was the second new full-power Spanish-language outlet in Houston, as KXLN-TV had begun the year before. The original studios were located on Stoney Brook in Houston, with further offices in Galveston staffed by two full-time employees. Telemundo had become a minority investor in Bluebonnet and purchased the remainder of the station that April. In addition to its Hispanic programming, KTMD in its early years brokered two hours a week to the publisher of the Southern Chinese Daily newspaper to air programs in Chinese. It also produced a variety of local programs, including the weekly talk show Nuestra Gente (Our People), the Galveston affairs program Cita con Galveston, and a weekly Catholic Mass.

In 2002, KTMD was granted permission to move its analog signal to channel 47 in order to operate its digital signal on channel 48, which would operate from a transmitter located in Missouri City rather than Friendswood. The station also cited interference from a station in Bryan for its reasoning to change its channel allocation. KTMD officially moved from channel 48 to channel 47 on November 9, 2002. In 2005, KTMD moved to new studio facilities.

KXLN remained the dominant Spanish-language station for some time, in news, ratings, and revenue, after KTMD signed on. In 2004, estimates showed that KXLN received $37.8 million in revenue compared to $9.8 million at KTMD, and there continues to be a large gap in news ratings between KXLN and KTMD.

== News operation ==
The station's news department was founded upon the station's 1988 sign-on; KTMD was the first to produce full-length local newscasts in Spanish, as KXLN did not begin doing so until 1990. However, by 1995, KXLN was recognized as having the higher-rated and higher-quality news product; Richard Vara of the Houston Chronicle commented, "Until more money is earmarked for news, channel 48 will have a death grip on second place." In 1998, under the leadership of ex-KTRK news director Richard Longoria, the station began to air its late newscast live for the first time, and it also became the first Spanish-language television station in the U.S. to add closed captioning to its newscasts.

In 2001, the station debuted a morning newscast from 6 to 7 a.m.; it was the area's only Spanish-language morning newscast. Later that year, KTMD hired former KXLN anchor Roberto Repreza. While KTMD was experiencing some news momentum, circumstances in the rest of 2001 led to layoffs. Tropical Storm Allison's strike on Houston in June 2001 caused lost revenue for all of the city's television stations, but the economic downturn resulting from the September 11 attacks would have more severe impacts. In October, citing low advertising revenues, KTMD canceled the morning newscast and laid off 14 staffers; some of the morning newscast's on-air personnel were moved to the evening newscasts as reporters.

While production of local news for KTMD was moved to a new regional production center in Fort Worth in 2006, the hub was unwound by 2010, with local newscasts once again originating from Houston. Beginning in 2014, a series of local news expansions at Telemundo have added hours of news to KTMD's output. A 4:30 p.m. show debuted at KVEA and 13 other Telemundo stations in 2014. In 2018, a noon newscast was added at 10 Telemundo stations, including KTMD. However, KXLN continues to be far stronger in ratings; in January 2022, KXLN's late newscast beat all stations in English and Spanish and attracted more than double the ratings of KTMD.

In September 2022, Telemundo started the regional morning newscast Noticiero Telemundo Texas, originating in Fort Worth and airing on Telemundo's owned-and-operated stations in the state and most of its affiliates. Additionally, KTMD's late news block was extended with the addition of a new 10:30 p.m. half hour. On November 1, 2024, Noticias Telemundo Texas was discontinued.

=== Notable former on-air staff ===
- Martin Berlanga (anchor, 2012–2018)
- Patricia Gras
- Daniella Guzman

== Technical information ==
=== Subchannels ===
The station's signal is multiplexed:

Subchannels of KTMD
Subchannel	Res.	Short name	Programming
47.1	1080i	KTMD-HD	Telemundo
47.2	480i	EXITOS	TeleXitos
47.3	480i	NBCLX	NBC True CRMZ
47.4	480i	COZI	Cozi TV
47.5	480i	OXYGEN	Oxygen
39.5	480i	Rewind	Rewind TV (KIAH)

Broadcast on behalf of another station

One subchannel is used to broadcast a subchannel of KIAH as part of Houston's ATSC 3.0 (NextGen TV) deployment plan; KIAH in turn broadcasts KTMD in ATSC 3.0.

=== Analog-to-digital conversion ===
KTMD ended regular programming on its analog signal, over UHF channel 47, on June 12, 2009, as part of the federally mandated transition from analog to digital television. The station's digital signal remained on its pre-transition UHF channel 48, using virtual channel 47.
