= León Krauze =

Mexican journalist, author, and news anchor

León Rodrigo Krauze Turrent (Mexico City, January 4, 1975) is a Mexican journalist, author, and news anchor.

== Personal life ==
He is the son of Enrique Krauze. He is married and father of his children. Krauze holds a master's degree from New York University.

== Career ==
He began his career as a sports journalist, focusing on football. That passion led him to become not only an expert and official chronicler of the Mexico national team but also a highly regarded historian: he has written four books and eighty documentaries on the history of “fútbol” in Mexico.

Since 1997, Krauze has covered politics in the United States, for both American and Mexican media outlets. In 2005 he published “La Casa Dividida,” an account of the first five years of the Bush presidency. Krauze has interviewed leading political figures such as Juan Manuel Santos, Nick Clegg, Felipe Calderón, Enrique Peña Nieto, Shimon Peres, and Barack Obama.

His work has been published in Foreign Affairs, The New Republic, Foreign Policy, Newsweek, Los Angeles Times, El País, and Letras Libres. Currently, he is a contributor at The Daily Beast, a weekly columnist for Mexico’s El Universal, and hosts the Gabfest en Español podcast for Slate. As of 2016 he has been a professor of journalism at the USC Annenberg School.

For five years, Krauze hosted “Segunda Emisión”, Mexico’s highest rated afternoon radio newsmagazine. Upon moving to television, Krauze quickly became a success as well, anchoring “Hora 21”, the main newscast for Foro TV, Televisa’s 24/7 news network. For 10 years, Krauze was the main anchor at Univision’s Los Angeles station, KMEX-DT, and also hosted the program Open Source for Univision-owned cable channel Fusion TV. Krause also hosted a daily political commentary radio show on Univision's Los Angeles flagship talk radio KTNQ, called "En boca de León" ("In the Lion's Mouth").

Krauze's last newscast for KMEX occurred on January 14, 2022. Ten days later, on January 24, Krauze moved to Univision in Miami and became co-anchor of its late-night national newscast, Noticiero Univision Edición Nocturna, alongside Patricia Janiot.

On November 15, 2023, Krauze announced his departure from Univision, apparently due to Univision carrying an interview with Donald Trump.

== Published work ==
- ”El Vuelo de Eluán”, FCE, México, 2005.
- ”La Casa Dividida”, Planeta, México, 2005.
- "La Mesa - Historias de Nuestra Gente", HarperCollins, 2016
