= Félix de Bedout =

Colombian television journalist

Félix de Bedout Molina
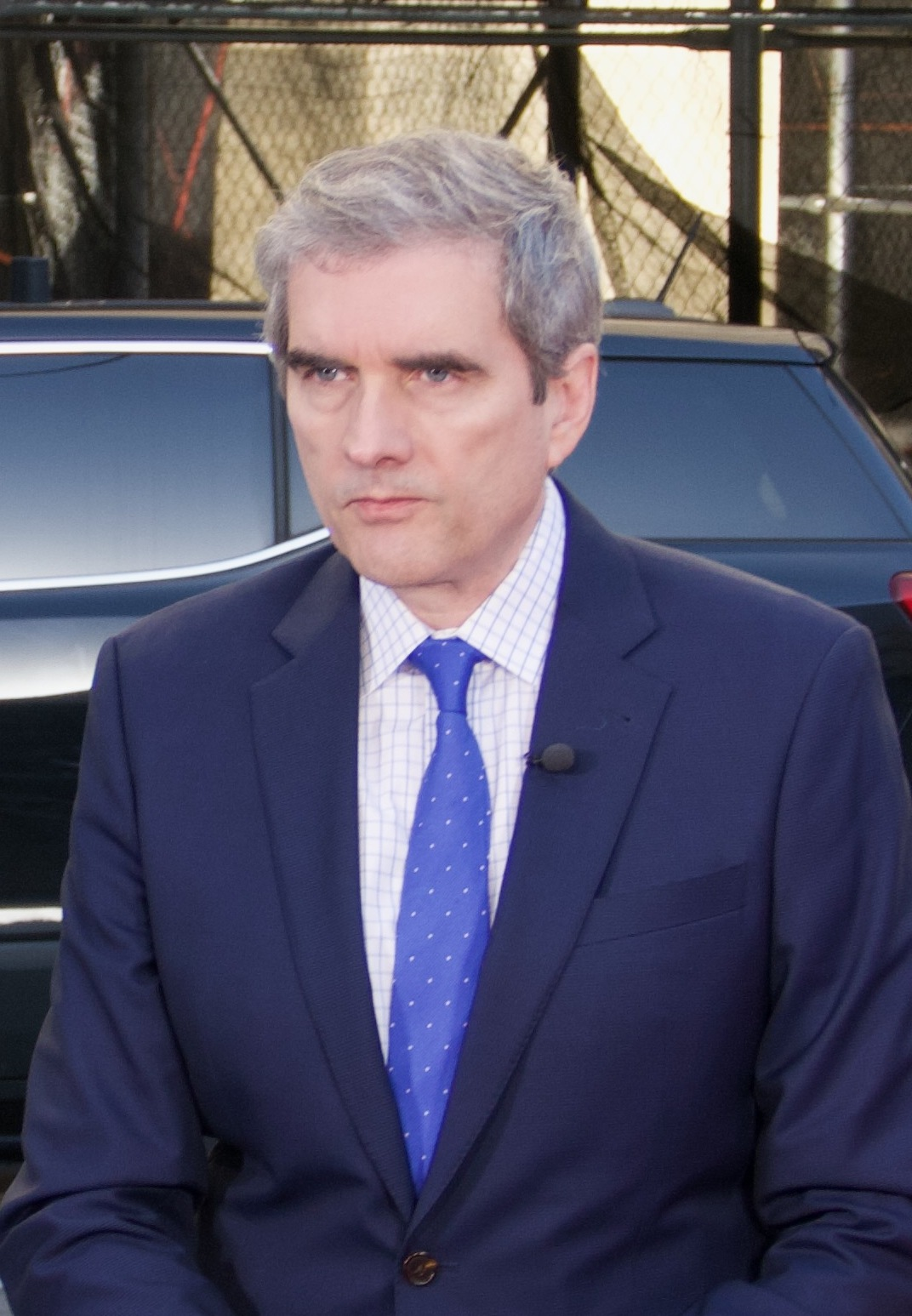
- Félix de Bedout in 2024

Félix de Bedout Molina is a Colombian-French journalist, born 24 June 1964 in Medellín. He has worked in Noticiero Nacional, NTC Noticias, Félix Noche, Reportaje al Misterio and Historia Secreta of History Latin America.

In 2011, De Bedout became part of morning radio show La W of W Radio. On 18 July 2011, he joined Univision's Despierta America in Miami. On 10 January 2012, De Bedout left Despierta America to become the news anchor of Noticiero Univision Fin de Semana.
