= María Elena Salinas =

American journalist (born 1954)

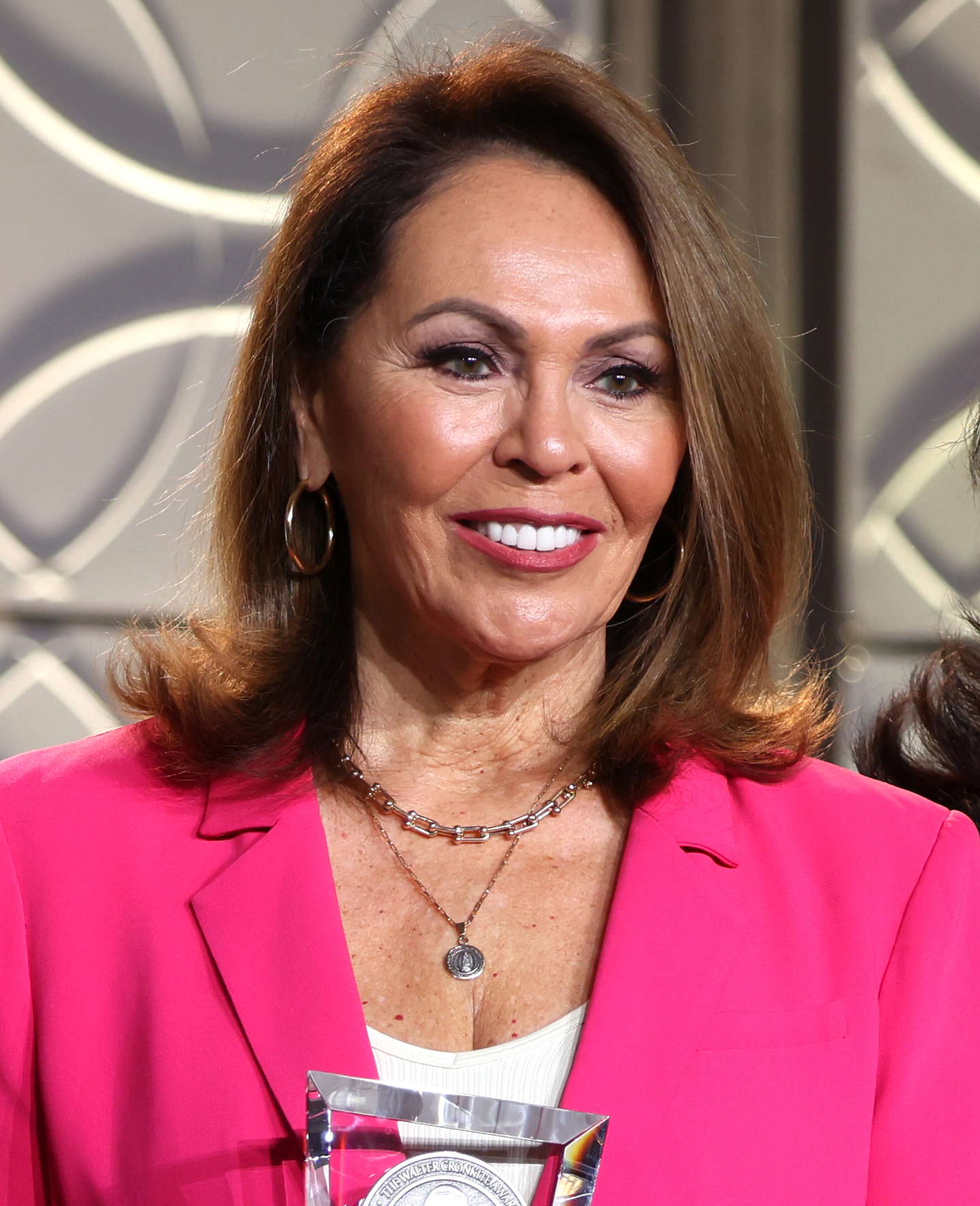
- Salinas in 2026
- Born: December 30, 1954 (age 71); Los Angeles, California, U.S.
- Education: University of California, Los Angeles
- Occupations: Journalist, actress, screenwriter
- Years active: 1981–present
- Employers: Univision (1981–2017); Investigation Discovery (2017–2018); Telemundo (2018); CBS News (2019–2021); ABC News (2022–Present)
- Notable work: Voice of Hispanic America
- Spouse: Eliott Rodriguez (m. 1993–2007)
- Children: 2
- Awards: 2017 NAB Broadcasting Hall of Fame

María Elena Salinas (born December 30, 1954) is a Mexican and American broadcast journalist, news anchor, and author. Called the "Voice of Hispanic America" by The New York Times, Salinas is one of the most recognized Hispanic female journalists in the United States. She was the co-anchor of Noticiero Univision, the primary evening news broadcast on Univision, and the co-host of the news magazine program Aquí y Ahora (Here and Now).

Salinas has been working for more than three decades in the United States and 18 Latin American countries. She has interviewed Latin American heads of state, rebel leaders, dictators, and every United States president since Jimmy Carter.

== Journalism career ==
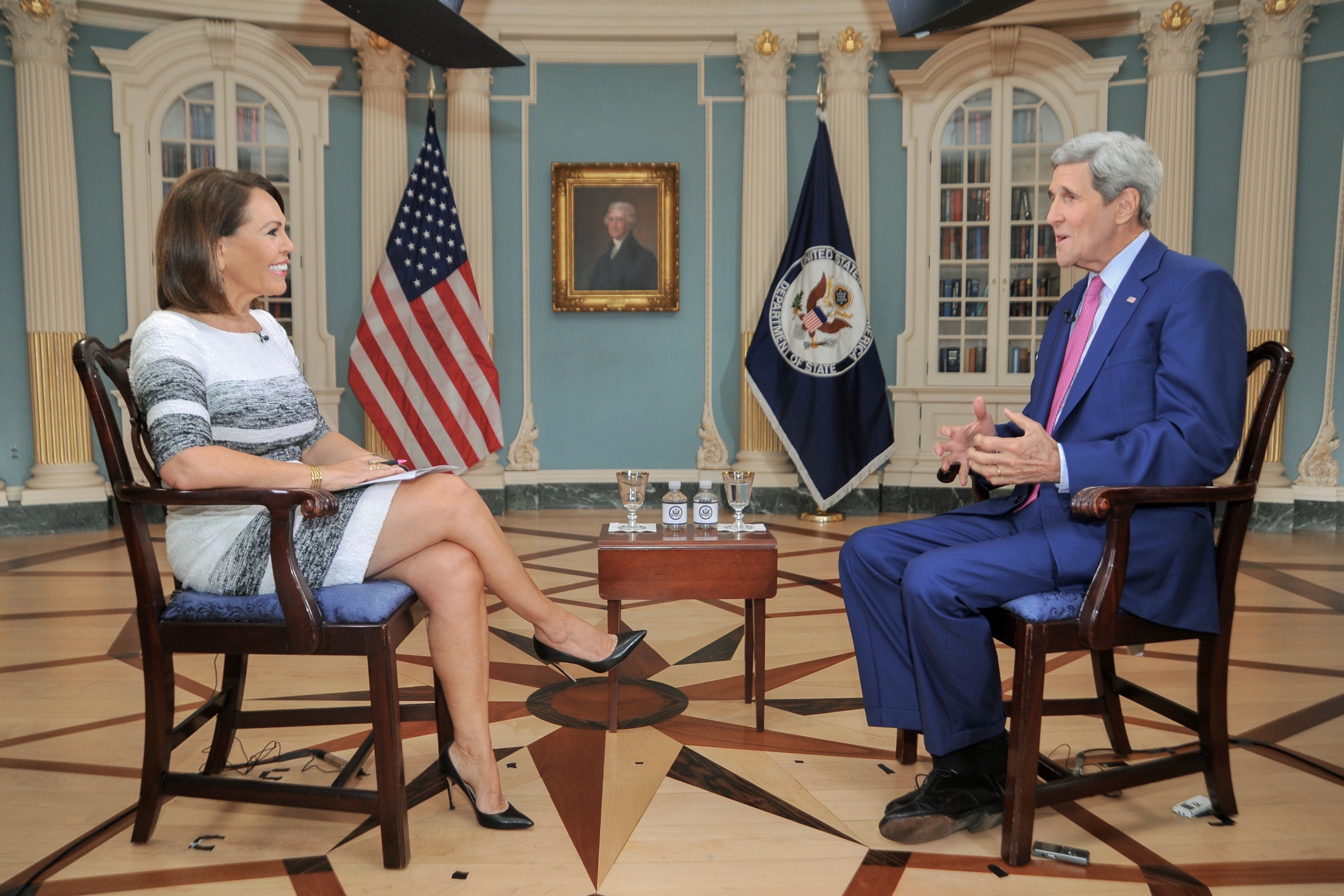
Salinas interviews United States Secretary of State John Kerry in 2015

Salinas began as a reporter, anchor, and public affairs host for KMEX-TV, the Univision affiliate in Los Angeles, in 1981. She became the anchor of the national Spanish-language news program Noticiero Univision in 1987.

She has interviewed figures such as former US Presidents Bill Clinton and Barack Obama; Manuel Noriega, the former military dictator of Panama; Nicaraguan President Daniel Ortega; and the Zapatista Army of National Liberation spokesman Subcomandante Marcos. She has also interviewed celebrities such as Jennifer Lopez, Ricky Martin and Gloria Estefan.

Salinas was among the first female journalists in wartime Baghdad. She has been interviewed by Katie Couric Bill Moyers, and others.

Salinas participated in the bilingual national Democratic presidential candidate debate on Hispanic issues in 2004 and again in 2007, co-hosting the first Democratic and Republican presidential candidate forums in Spanish on the Univision Network.

From 2001 to 2011, she wrote a weekly syndicated column in English and Spanish. In 2017–18, she hosted two seasons of the English-language crime program The Real Story with María Elena Salinas, on Investigation Discovery.

On August 3, 2017, Univision announced that Salinas would leave her post as co-anchor of Noticiero Univisión at the end of 2017. In a Facebook post, Salinas said she plans to become an independent news producer and was not pushed out. That same year, Salinas was inducted into the NAB Broadcasting Hall of Fame.

On July 1, 2018, she participated in Telemundo's Mexican presidential elections coverage. On December 1, exactly five months later, she was part of Telemundo's news team covering the Mexican presidential inauguration from Mexico City.

On July 22, 2019, CBS News announced Maria Elena Salinas would join as a contributor. María Elena Salinas joined "CBS This Morning" to break down the diverse Latino communities across the US that were long held as a single voting bloc. Still, economic, geographic, and cultural differences show stark divides in how Latino Americans have cast their ballots in the 2020 United States presidential election.

In March 2022, Maria Elena Salinas became contributor for ABC News In 2024, she launched Cinco Preguntas con María Elena Salinas, an independent Spanish-language podcast in which she interviews public figures.

== Public service and philanthropy ==
For almost twenty years, Salinas has volunteered for the National Association of Latino Elected and Appointed Officials, which encourages immigrants to vote and otherwise participate in politics; she is the spokesperson for its Ya Es Hora ("It's Time") program.

Salinas founded the National Association of Hispanic Journalists and was inducted into its Hall of Fame in 2006. She also sponsors the Maria Elena Salinas Scholarship for college students interested in Spanish news broadcasting.

She is on the boards of the Hispanic Scholarship Fund and the International Women's Media Foundation.

== Awards and recognition ==
Salinas has won numerous awards and distinctions for her journalism and philanthropic work.

Salinas won a 2014 Peabody Award, Walter Cronkite Award and Gracie Award for her news and documentary special "Entre el abandono y el rechazo" (Between Abandonment and Rejection), a prime-time report on the exodus of Central American children to the United States, which judges praised as "balanced and revealing."

In 2014, she won the Broadcast Legend Award from the Radio and Television News Association of Southern California. In 2012, with her co-anchor Jorge Ramos, she received an Emmy Award for Lifetime Achievement from the National Academy of Television Arts and Sciences. In 2013, Broadcasting & Cable and Multichannel News presented Salinas with the Award for Outstanding Achievement at the 11th Annual Hispanic Television Summit, produced by Schramm Marketing Group. Earlier in her career, Salinas was part of the Univision News team that received the Edward R. Murrow Award for the network's coverage of the Atlanta Olympic Park bombings in 1996.

For her philanthropic work, Salinas is a recipient of the Intrepid Award from the National Organization for Women and has been honored by organizations including the Mexican American Legal Defense and Educational Fund, the National Association of Latino Elected and Appointed Officials and the Congressional Hispanic Caucus Institute, among others.

In 2017, Salinas was a commencement speaker at American University and California State University, Fullerton and received an honorary doctorate from American University. She was presented with the Leading Ladies of Entertainment accolade by the Latin Recording Academy in 2020.

From September 15, 2023 – August 17, 2025, she was one of seven Latinas profiled in the Smithsonian Institution's National Museum of American History's exhibit "¡De última hora!: Latinas Report Breaking News."

== Personal life ==
Salinas's parents immigrated to the United States from Mexico in the 1940s. She was born in Los Angeles in 1954. She lived in Mexico for 7 years as a child. Since 1991, Salinas has lived in Miami with her two daughters, Julia Alexandra and Gabriela Maria.

Salinas's autobiography, Yo Soy la Hija de mi Padre (I Am my Father's Daughter, 2006) covers her discovery that her father had once been a Catholic priest.
