= Jorge Ramos (news anchor) =

Mexican journalist

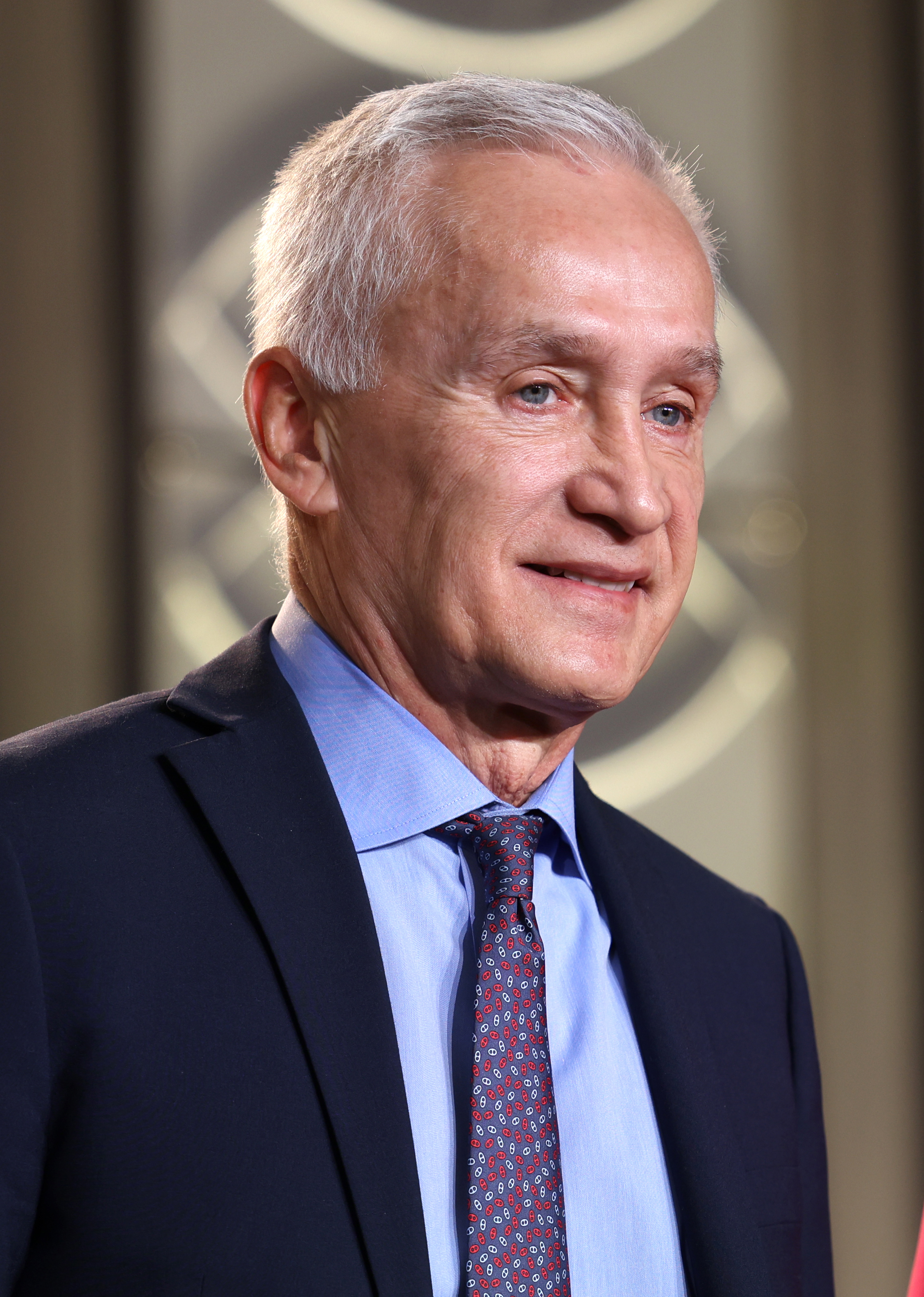
- Ramos in 2026
- Born: Jorge Gilberto Ramos Ávalos; March 16, 1958 (age 68); Mexico City, Mexico
- Citizenship: American, Mexican
- Education: Ibero-American University (BA); University of Miami (MA)
- Occupation: Journalist
- Employer: Univision (1985–2024)
- Notable credit(s): Noticiero Univision co-anchor (1987–2024); Al Punto host (2007–2024); Fusion host (2013–2021)
- Spouses: Gina Montaner (divorced) Lisa Bolivar (divorced) Chiquinquirá Delgado (m. 2014)
- Children: 2, including Paola Ramos
- Website: jorgeramos.com

Jorge Gilberto Ramos Ávalos (Spanish pronunciation: [ˈxoɾxe ˈramos]; born March 16, 1958) is a Mexican and American journalist and news anchor.

Based in Miami, Florida, he anchored the Univision news television program Noticiero Univision, the Univision Sunday-morning political news program Al Punto, and the Fusion TV English-language program America with Jorge Ramos. He is one of the best-known Spanish-language news anchors in the United States. During his 39-year tenure with Univision, he has covered five wars, and events ranging from the fall of the Berlin Wall to the War in Afghanistan.

== Early life ==
Jorge Gilberto Ramos Ávalos was born on March 16, 1958, in Mexico City, Mexico, to a Roman Catholic family, and he was raised in the Bosques de Echegaray neighborhood of Naucalpan, a suburb of Mexico City. His father was an architect. He attended Catholic schools where he states he was abused by the priests.

Ramos graduated from the Universidad Iberoamericana in Mexico City where he majored in communications. Ramos has a Master's degree in International Studies from the University of Miami. In 2007, the University of Richmond conferred an honorary Doctor of Letters.

== Career ==
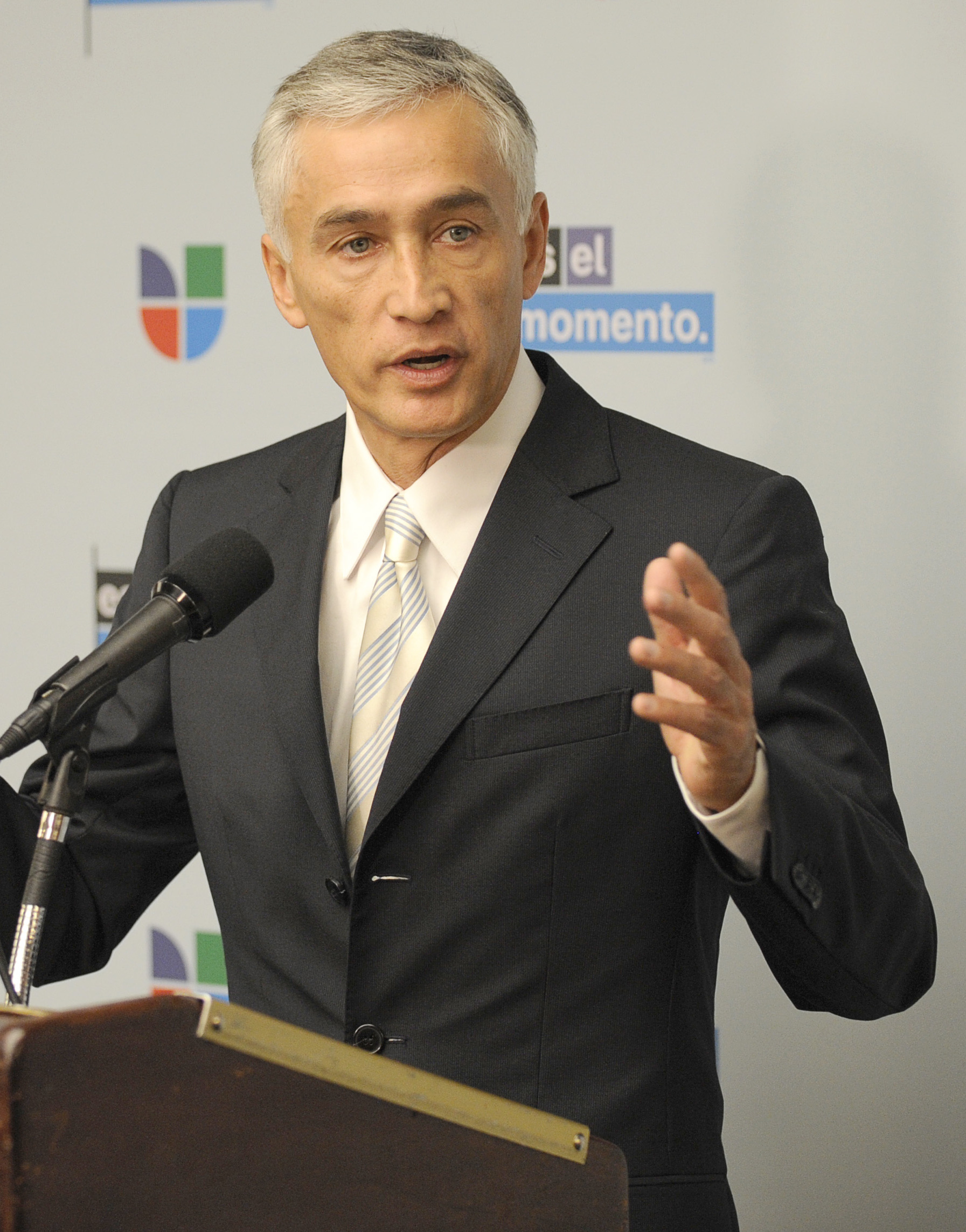
Ramos speaker for NASA's Hispanic Education Campaign, January 2010

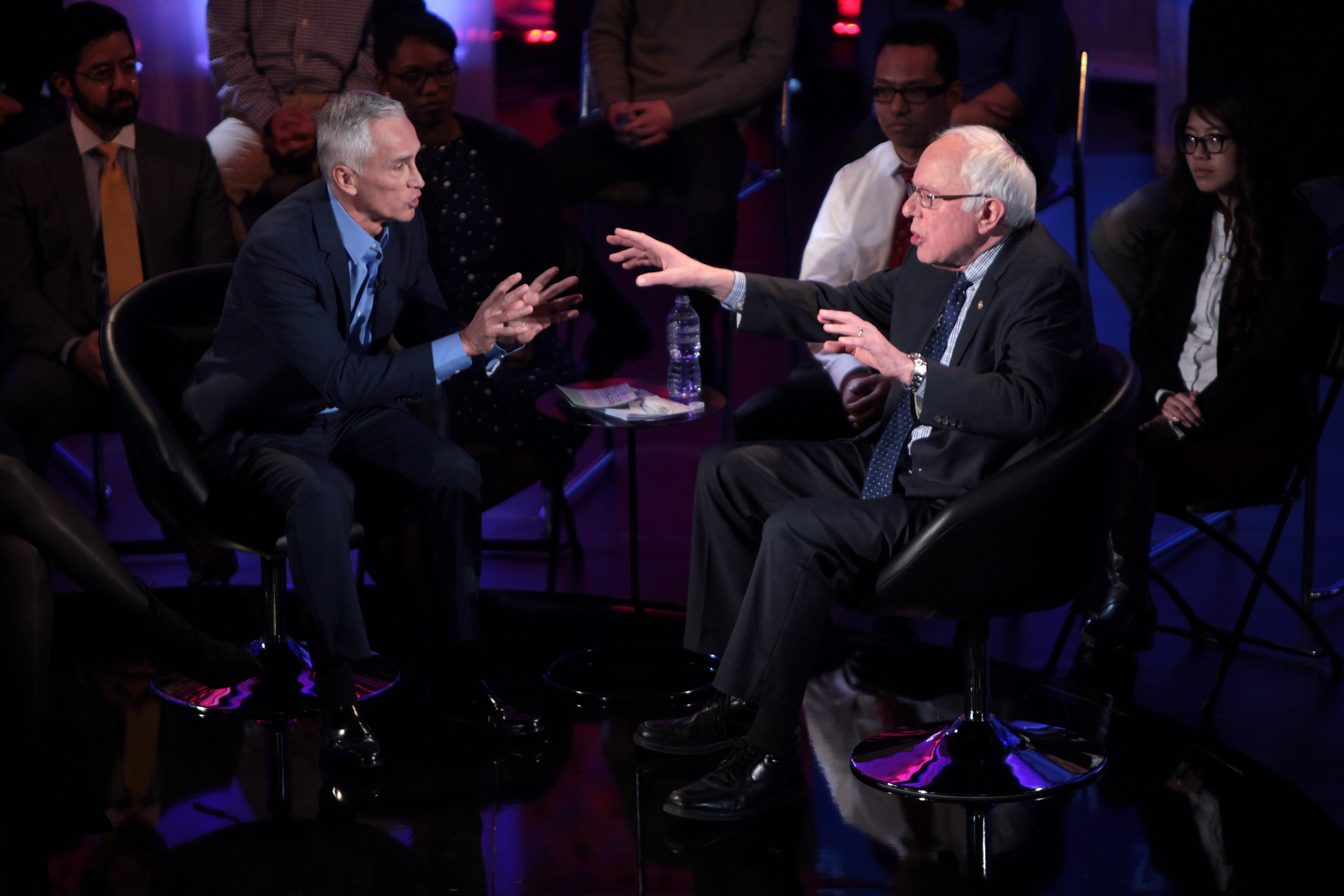
Ramos interviewing Democratic presidential candidate and U.S. Senator Bernie Sanders, January 2016

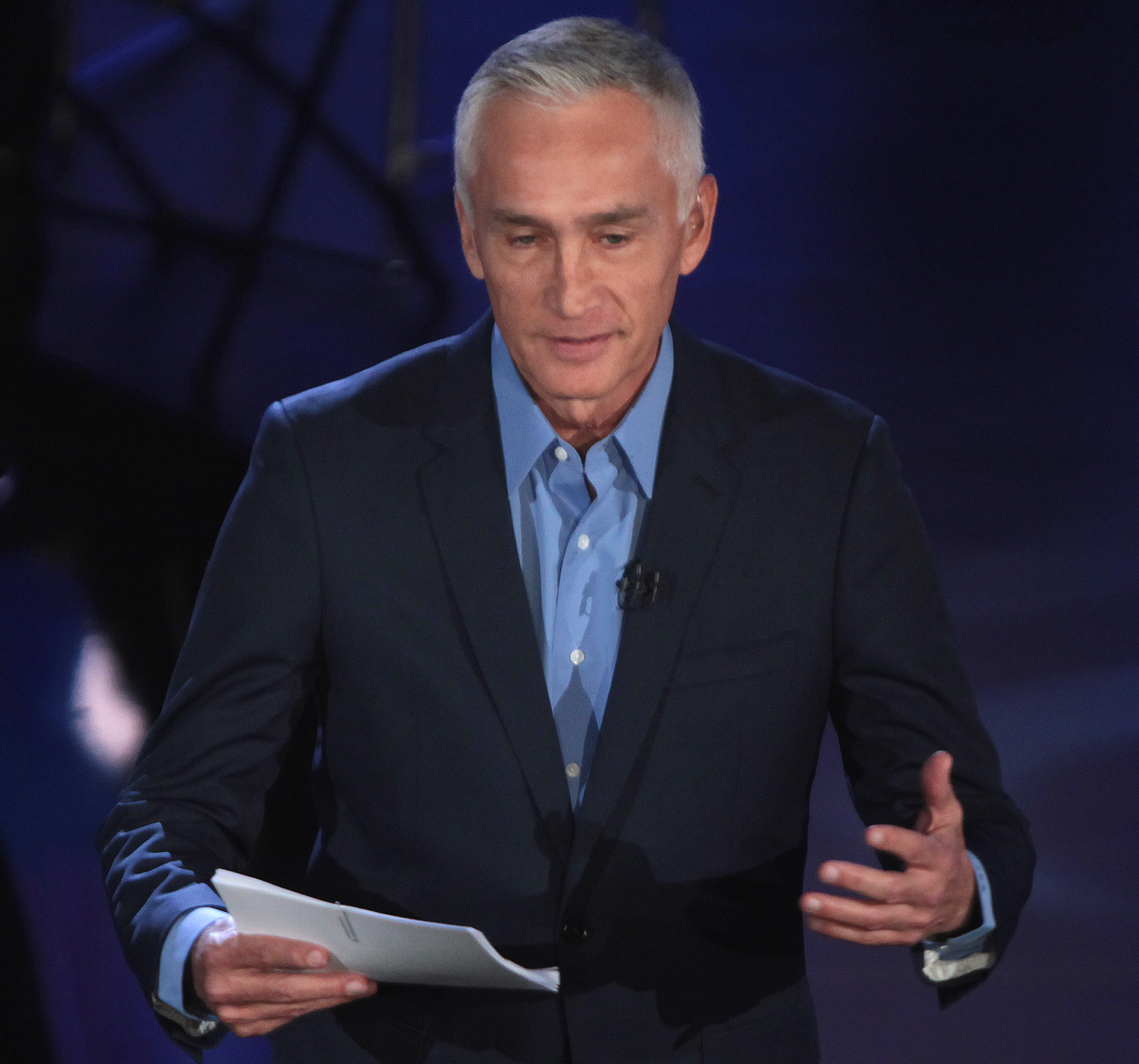
Ramos moderating the Iowa Brown and Black Forum part of the 2016 Democratic Party presidential debates and forums, January 2016

Ramos worked for Grupo Televisa's flagship XEW-TV in Mexico City for the network's local version of 60 Minutes. At the age of 24, he quit that job after a story he produced that was critical of Mexico's government was censored. In 1983, he left Mexico on a student visa for Los Angeles, where he planned to enroll in the UCLA Extension's journalism classes. In 1984, he was hired by KMEX-TV, an affiliate of what was then the Spanish International Network (SIN) in Los Angeles, which operated on a shoestring budget in a run-down facility on Melrose Avenue. At KMEX, Ramos felt he could express himself freely: "To me it was a palace... the United States gave me opportunities that my country of origin could not: freedom of the press and complete freedom of expression." Three years later, he became the host for KMEX's morning program, Mundo Latino. In 1987, Ramos then joined SIN's national operation which was rebranded as the Univision network a year later after coming under new ownership; Univision has a broad entertainment and news-sharing agreement with Televisa.

Since 1987, Ramos has been the anchorman for Noticiero Univision, a nightly Spanish language newscast, alongside colleague María Elena Salinas. He also hosts Al Punto, a Spanish-language Sunday public affairs program aired weekly on Univision, and America with Jorge Ramos, an English language news magazine on Fusion TV.

In 1989, as he watched the fall of the Berlin Wall, Ramos has said he remembered thinking, "This is why I am what I am!" Other world events he covered include the Salvadoran Civil War, the Persian Gulf War, the dissolution of the Soviet Union, and the 9/11 terrorist attacks. During the United States's War in Afghanistan, Ramos traveled there on his own while on vacation because his network refused to send him. Throughout his career he has covered five wars.

As of 2014, KMEX-DT his Univision 34 news shows regularly beat their English language competition among young viewers. He has interviewed multiple world leaders including Barack Obama, George W. Bush, Bill Clinton, George H. W. Bush, Fidel Castro, Daniel Ortega and Hugo Chávez.

Ramos also writes a bilingual newspaper column that is published internationally, and appears regularly as a pundit on English-language cable networks, like CNN and MSNBC. Polls among American Latinos rank him as the most trusted and influential Hispanic in America, surpassing all other political leaders, and his Q Score among Latino audiences places him between soccer star Lionel Messi and pop singer Shakira.

In 2002, he founded Despierta Leyendo (Wake Up Reading), the first book club in the history of Spanish-language television.

On February 21, 2008, he represented Univision in a Democratic debate between Senators Hillary Clinton and Barack Obama on The University of Texas at Austin campus in Austin, Texas.

In 2012, Ramos, critical of the lack of Latino moderators in any of the U.S. presidential debates, complained that the debate commission was "stuck in the 1950s". When Univision held its own forums with candidates Barack Obama and Mitt Romney, Ramos challenged both of them on their immigration policies, specifically Romney's "self-deportation" policy, which Ramos considered an insult to Latinos, and Obama's deportation of more than 1.4 million people, and his reneging on his promise to address immigration during his first term. Washington Monthly named Ramos the broadcaster who would most determine the 2012 presidential election. Ramos' increased notability, however, led to criticism of his advocacy approach. To this Ramos has stated, "Our position is clearly pro-Latino or pro-immigrant ... We are simply being the voice of those who don't have a voice."

In 2015, after Donald Trump became a presidential candidate, Ramos pursued an interview with Trump for months. When he sent Trump a handwritten request in June, Trump, who had filed a lawsuit against Univision over its decision to drop the Miss Universe pageant following the candidate's comments about Mexican immigrants, posted Ramos's letter on Instagram, which exposed Ramos's cell phone number. Trump later deleted the post.

On August 25, 2015, Ramos attended a news conference held in Dubuque, Iowa, by Trump. Prior to attending, Ramos studied previous Trump press conferences and discovered a pattern of Trump repetitively interjecting "excuse me" and calling on another reporter when asked a question opposing his beliefs. Due to this knowledge, Ramos refused to sit down and persistently continued questioning Trump about his immigration policies when rebuffed. Ramos insisted on his rights as a reporter and United States citizen to ask a question, prompting Trump's Head of Security Keith Schiller to push him backwards out of the conference room. About 15 minutes later, Trump allowed Ramos to return to the conference, where he and Trump engaged in a heated exchange on the issue. Trump later explained that he had not called on Ramos for a question, as he had called on another reporter in the audience. Ramos accused Trump of "spreading hate" with his calls for mass deportations of undocumented families, and repealing birthright citizenship, and questioned the feasibility of Trump's proposals. He also questioned Trump's viability as a candidate among Latino voters, citing a poll indicating that 75% of those voters held unfavorable opinions of him, and projected that Trump would only get 16% of the Latino vote. Election exit polls showed Trump getting 29% of the Hispanic vote, a 13% increase over Ramos's projection. Most Latinos did not vote though. Latino turnout was actually under 50%, even lower than the historically low election turnout overall. It was higher in the prior election since Obama was running.

The press conference incident inspired Ramos to create his documentary Hate Rising focused on increasing incidents of racial bigotry and violence across the country, which aired October 23, 2016, on Univision and Fusion. In preparation for the documentary, Ramos met with members of various hate groups across the country including Ku Klux Klan members and neo-Nazis, along with Latino and Muslim victims. His journey lasted nine months, often placing him in danger as both an immigrant and a Mexican-American man. In order to gain face time with members of white supremacist groups, Ramos partnered with director Catherine Tambini, an American who the groups were under the impression they would be speaking to, and only right before the interview started did Ramos sit down to ask questions.

In 2016, Ramos began leveraging Facebook Live to stream raw footage taken on his phone to social media audiences, gaining 2.6 million views on his Iowa caucus videos and over four million on his reports during the New Hampshire primaries.

On February 25, 2019, he was held with his journalistic group in the Miraflores Palace after an interview with Nicolás Maduro. After seizing the equipment and interview recordings, he was released hours later and deported from the country. During the interview, Maduro denied there was a humanitarian crisis in Venezuela, which led Ramos to show Maduro images of Venezuelans eating garbage to point out that there was indeed a crisis. After being released, Ramos stated that he and his group were held because this action bothered Maduro. The Information Minister of Maduro, Jorge Rodríguez, described the incident as a "cheap show."

On April 12, 2019, his intervention in the morning conference of Mexican president Andrés Manuel López Obrador was controversial over the confrontation he held with López Obrador, around homicide figures in Mexico in the period of the administration. The episode opened a debate on the use of figures of malicious homicides in Mexico and its different sources. He interviewed Fidel Castro, confronted Obama on deportations, confronted Trump and is reportedly an admirer of Oriana Fallaci.

On September 9, 2024, Ramos announced that he would depart from Univision following the 2024 presidential election, after a 39-year tenure with the network. His last newscast was December 13, 2024.

== Personal life ==
Ramos earned a master's degree in international studies at the University of Miami in Florida.

In 2008, Ramos became a United States citizen, after many years of feeling personally conflicted over the matter. He had considered himself just another "Mexican with a green card." That year, however, his 50th birthday, he had lived in Mexico 25 years and 25 years in the United States, and came to a realization, explaining, "You have to go through a mental and emotional process to recognize who you really are," Ramos said. "I finally recognized that I cannot be defined by one country. I am from both countries. It took me many years to make peace with that thought, and that I was never going back to Mexico."

Ramos has been married twice. His first wife was Gina Montaner, daughter of exiled Cuban author Carlos Alberto Montaner; they had one daughter, Paola (born 1988). They divorced in 1990 and Paola was raised by her mother in Spain. In 1992, he married Lisa Bolivar in a Roman Catholic ceremony at the Cathedral of San Juan Bautista in San Juan, Puerto Rico. They had one son, Nicolas, and they divorced in 2005. He dated Mexican actress Ana de la Reguera, but since 2011, he has been in a relationship with Venezuelan TV host and actress Chiquinquirá Delgado, who has two daughters from previous relationships. He lives in the Coconut Grove neighborhood of Miami.

Although raised Roman Catholic, Ramos does not believe in God, calling himself an agnostic. He has criticized Pope Francis for presiding over the canonization of Pope John Paul II, who he believes willingly covered up abuses committed by Catholic priests.

Ramos is registered as an independent voter.

Ramos disclosed in June 2015 that his daughter, Paola Ramos, was working for Hillary Clinton's 2016 presidential campaign.

== Awards and accolades ==
Jorge Ramos "has won 10 Emmy awards (including an honorary Emmy and a Lifetime Achievement award)" and the Maria Moors Cabot Prize for excellence in journalism.

In 2015, Ramos was one of the people selected for the five different covers of Time's issue listing "The World's 100 Most Influential People". That same year he was awarded the International Career in Journalism accolade by Ondas Awards.
