= 45th News and Documentary Emmy Awards =

- Date: September 25, 2024 (News Categories); September 26, 2024 (Documentary Categories)
- Location: Palladium Times Square, New York City
- Presented by: National Academy of Television Arts and Sciences
- Most awards: The Whole Story with Anderson Cooper and Trafficked with Mariana van Zeller (5)
- Most nominations: Trafficked with Mariana van Zeller (20)

Television/radio coverage
- Network: Watch.TheEmmys.TV

The 45th News and Documentary Emmy Awards were presented by the National Academy of Television Arts and Sciences (NATAS), to honor the best in American news and documentary programming in 2023. The winners were announced on two ceremonies held at Palladium Times Square in New York City and live-streamed at Watch.TheEmmys.TV and the Emmys app.

The nominees were announced on July 25, 2024. CNN was the most nominated network, scoring 39 nominations. National Geographic's investigative series Trafficked with Mariana van Zeller led the nominations with 20, followed by PBS' documentary program FRONTLINE with 17. The nominations for the international categories were announced on August 8, 2024, where both Brazil and the United Kingdom received two nominations each, while Bulgaria and India achieved their first nominations for the Current Affairs & News awards.

The winners of the news categories were announced on September 25, 2024, with the winners for the documentary categories being revealed on September 26, 2024. The most awards for a network were won by CNN, numbering eleven. The Whole Story with Anderson Cooper and Trafficked with Mariana van Zeller were the most awarded programs with five awards each.

== Winners and nominees ==
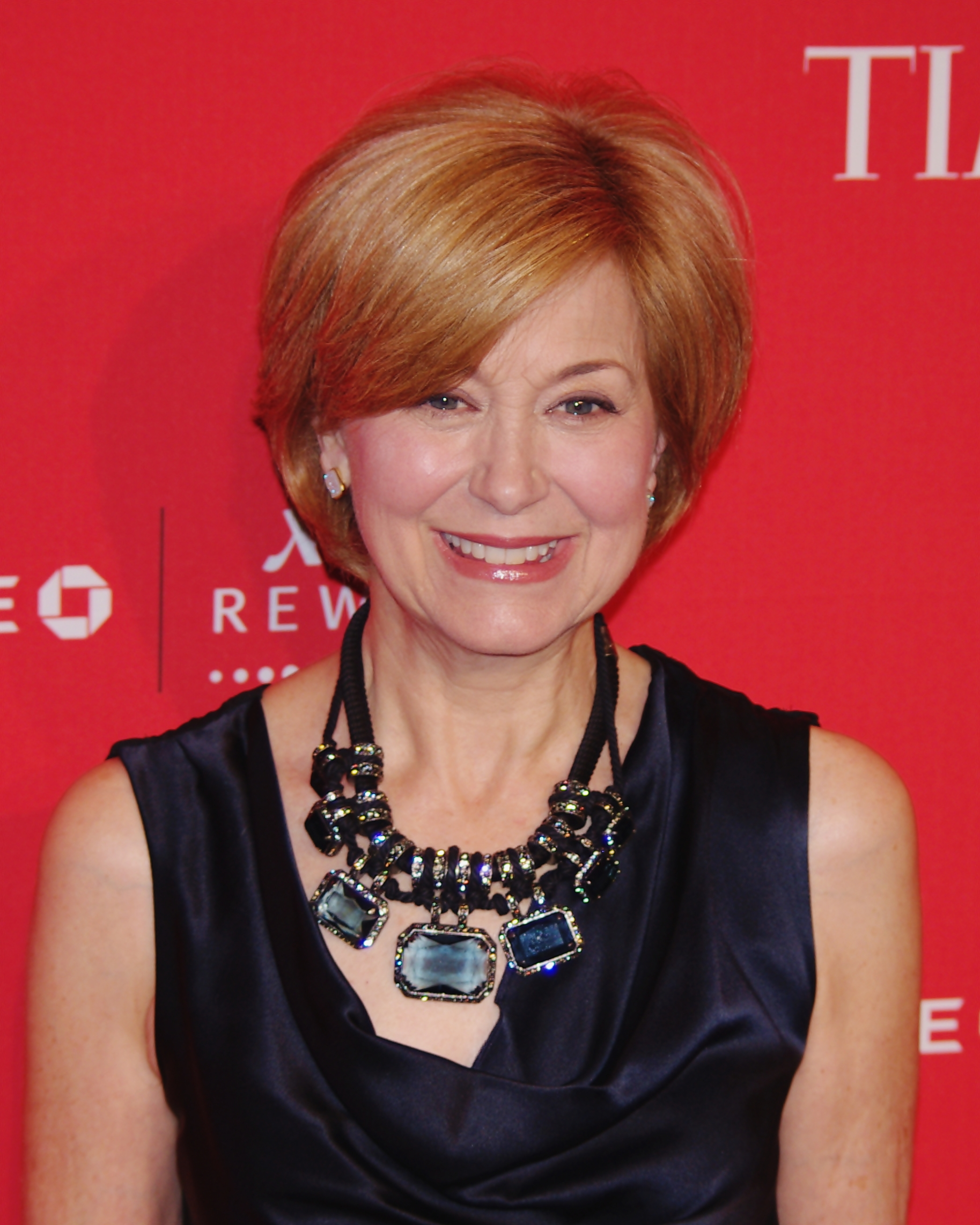
Jane Pauley, Lifetime Achievement Award recipient

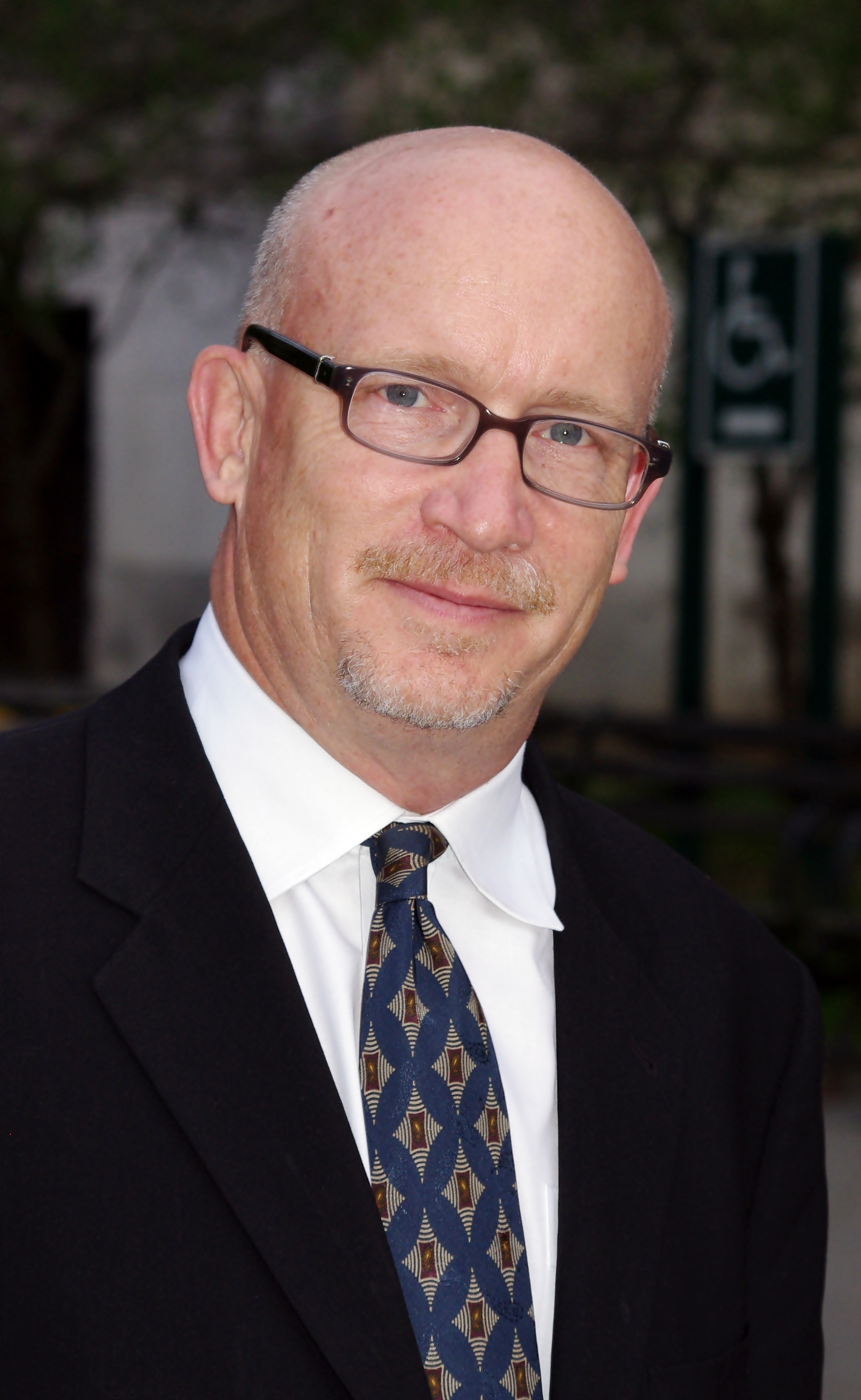
Alex Gibney, Lifetime Achievement Award recipient

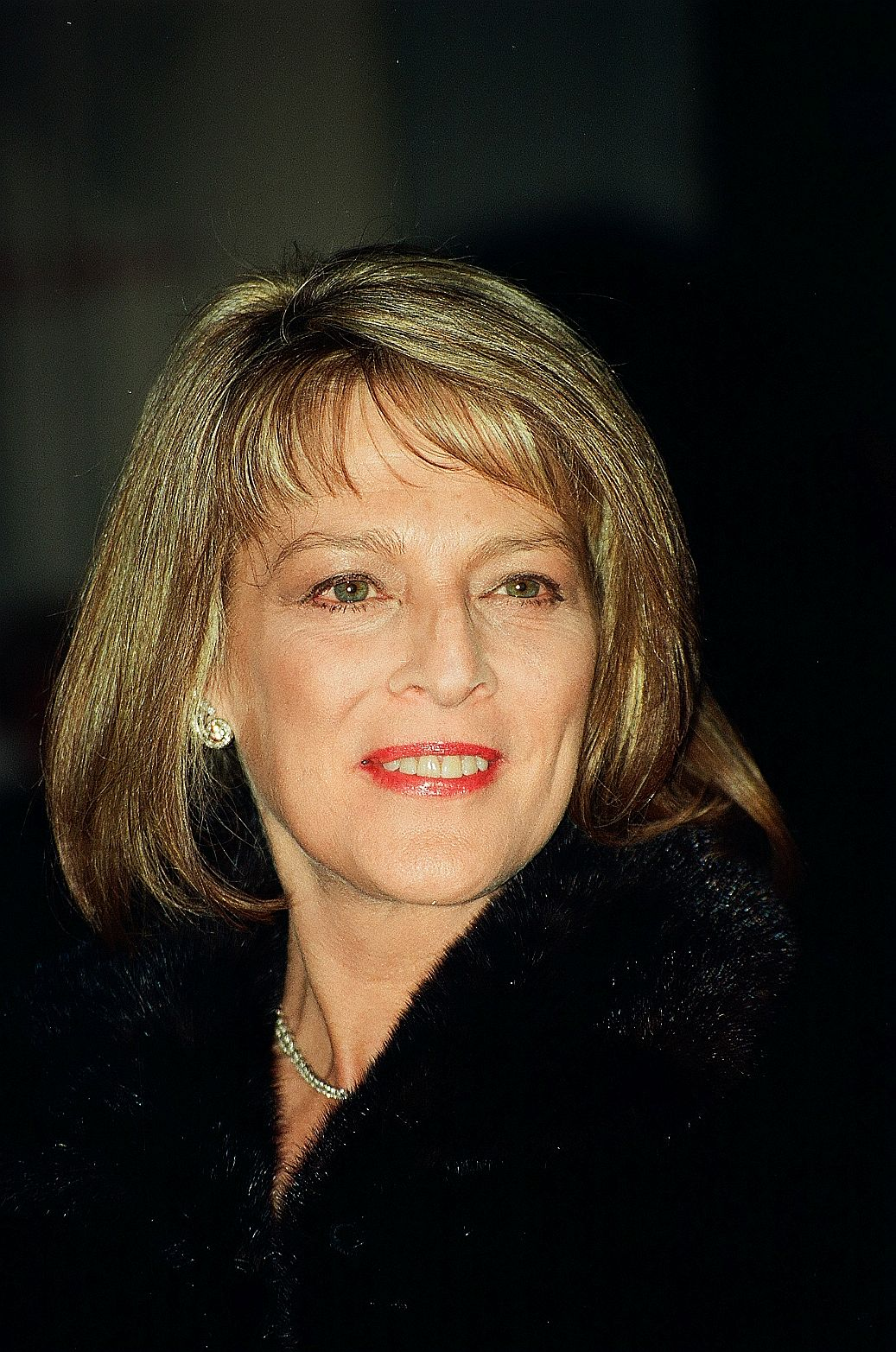
Rita Braver, Golden Circle Inductee

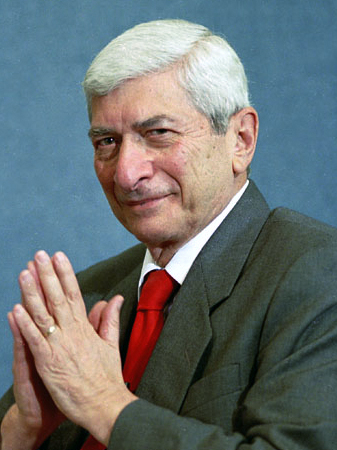
Marvin Kalb, Golden Circle Inductee

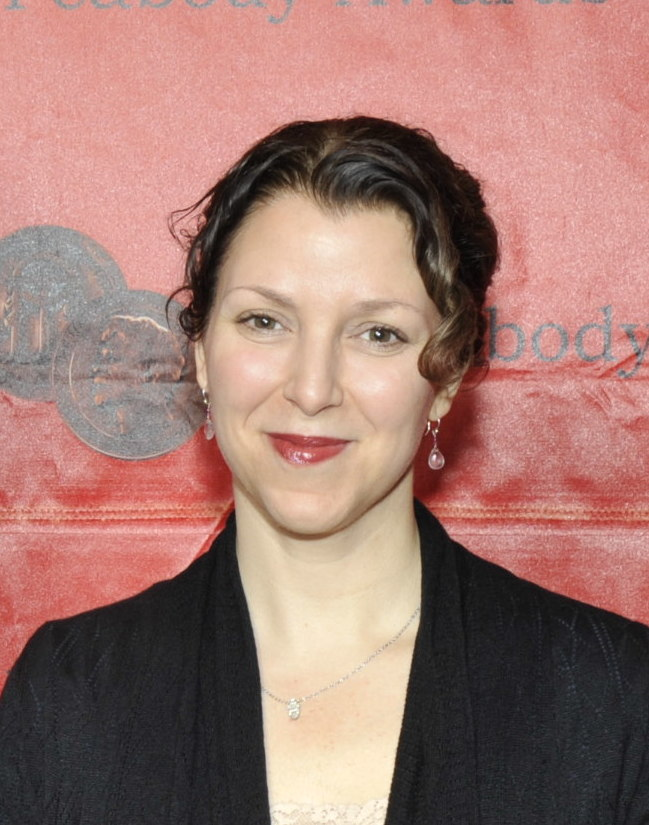
Raney Aronson-Rath, Silver Circle Inductee

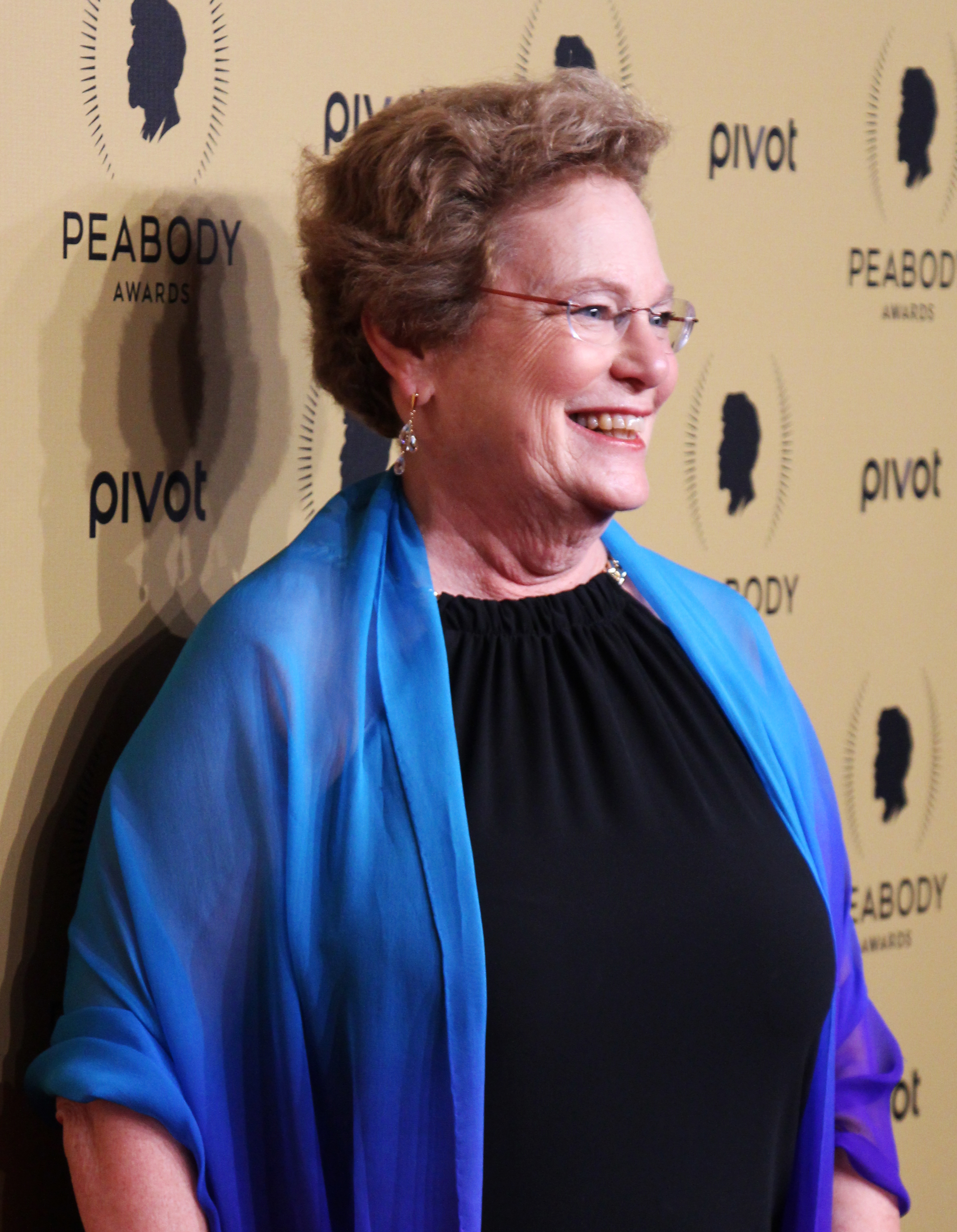
Abby Ginzberg, Silver Circle Inductee

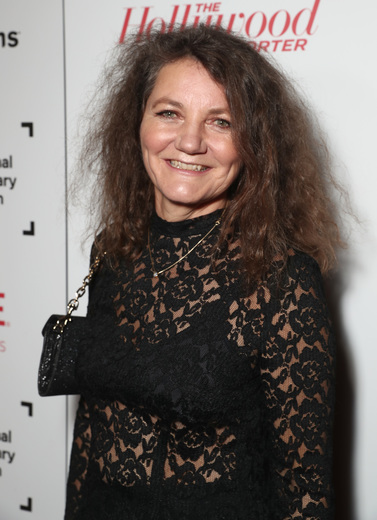
Mette Hoffman Meyer, Silver Circle Inductee

The nominees were announced on July 25, 2023. The winners were announced on September 25 and 26, 2024.

=== Lifetime Achievement Award ===
- Jane Pauley (news)
- Alex Gibney (documentary)

=== Gold Circle Inductees ===
- Rodney Batten – Photojournalist, NBC News (news)
- Rita Braver – National Correspondent, CBS Sunday Morning, CBS News (news)
- María Antonieta Collins – Journalist, Television Host, Univision (news)
- Marvin Kalb – Chief Diplomatic Correspontand, NBC News, CBS News, Meet the Press (news)
- Tom Spain – Director and Cinematographer, Tom Spain Inc. (documentary)

=== Silver Circle Inductees ===
- Catherine MacKenzie – Executive Producer, ABC News (news)
- Javier Morgado – Executive Producer, New Day, Early Start, CNN (news)
- Eduardo Suárez – Vice President of Production Programs, CNN en Español (news)
- Pierre Thomas – Chief Justice Correspondent, ABC News (news)
- Raney Aronson-Rath – Editor-in-Chief and Executive Producer, Frontline (documentary)
- Ric Esther Bienstock – Documentary Filmmaker and Executive Producer, Good Soup Productions Inc. (documentary)
- Abby Ginzberg – Documentary Producer and Director, Ginzberg Productions (documentary)
- Mette Hoffman Meyer – CEO/Executive Producer, The Why Foundation (documentary)

=== News Programming ===
Outstanding Live News Program	Outstanding Recorded News Program
ABC World News Tonight with David Muir (ABC); CBS Evening News with Norah O'Donnell (CBS); ABC News Live Prime with Linsey Davis (ABC); Anderson Cooper 360° (CNN); NBC Nightly News with Lester Holt (NBC)	The Whole Story with Anderson Cooper (CNN); 20/20 (ABC); CBS News Sunday Morning (CBS); IMPACT x Nightline (Hulu); Trafficked with Mariana van Zeller (National Geographic)
Outstanding Live Breaking News Coverage	Outstanding Emerging Journalist
"Israel-Hamas War" (CNN); NBC News Specials & Saturday Today: "Attack on Israel – October 7" (NBC / Peacock); ABC World News Tonight with David Muir: "Israel at War" (ABC); ABC News Live Prime with Linsey Davis: "Mass Shooting and Manhunt in Lewiston, Maine" (ABC); The ReidOut: "Tyre Nichols" (MSNBC)	Nada Bashir (CNN); Ellison Barber (NBC); Dasha Burns (NBC); Jeremy Diamond (CNN); Ashan Singh (ABC)
Outstanding Continuing News Coverage: Short Form	Outstanding Continuing News Coverage: Long Form
"Clarissa Ward Covers the Israel-Hamas War" (CNN); AC360: "David Culver Covers the Migrant Crisis" (CNN); "Israel – Gaza War" (BBC World News); "War in Gaza" (The New York Times); "War in Ukraine: Hope, Death and Defiance" (BBC World News)	The Whole Story with Anderson Cooper: "Terror in Israel Series" (CNN); On Assignment with Richard Engel: "Richard Engel Reports: Rise of Wagner"(NBC); 20/20 & ABC News Live: "Uvalde 365" (ABC); PBS News Hour: "War in the Holy Land" (PBS)
Outstanding Soft Feature Story: Short Form	Outstanding Soft Feature Story: Long Form
ABC World News Tonight with David Muir: "South Sudan: Isolated by Water and War" (ABC); "How a 1968 Student Protest Fueled a Chicano Rights Movement" (Retro Report); VICE News Tonight: "On the Frontlines of the Abortion War: Death Threats and Arsons" (Vice); CBS Sunday Morning: "This Land... Eatonville, FL" (CBS); ABC News Live Prime with Linsey Davis: "Uvalde 365: Recovering from Robb" (ABC)	20/20: "It Happened Here: A Year in Uvalde" (ABC); "After the Blast: The Will to Survive" (ABC); "Moving Isa" (Business Insider); Op-Docs: "The Army We Had" (The New York Times); The Whole Story with Anderson Cooper: "What Happened to San Francisco?" (CNN)
Outstanding Hard News Feature Story: Short Form	Outstanding Hard News Feature Story: Long Form
AJ+ Reports: "It's Bisan from Gaza and I'm Still Alive" (AJ+); "'I Cry Quietly': A Soldier Describes the Toll of Russia's War" (The New York Times); "Clarissa Ward Reports from Rafah Field Hospital in Gaza" (CNN); PBS News Hour: "Haiti in Crisis" (PBS); The Guardian Focus: "How I Survive: A Seven-Year-Old's Life in Gaza" (The Guardian)	VICE Special Report: "Inside Wagner: The Rise of Russia's Notorious Mercenaries" (Vice); FRONTLINE: "After Uvalde: Guns, Grief & Texas Politics" (PBS); VICE Special Report: "The Dangerous Rise of Andrew Tate" (Vice); "Exclusive: Inside a Ukrainian Battlefield Hospital" (The New York Times); The Whole Story with Anderson Cooper: "The Trek: A Migrant Trail to America" (CNN); VICE Special Report: "Warped By War: Inside Putin's Russia" (Vice)
Outstanding Investigative News Coverage: Short Form	Outstanding Investigative News Coverage: Long Form
"Poisoned Water" (Scripps News); "The Coast Guard's Secret" (CNN); "Dishonored" (CBS); NBC Nightly News with Lester Holt: "NBC News Investigates: Hospital Giant Putting Profits Over Patients?" (NBC); "Visual Evidence Shows Israel Dropped 2,000-Pound Bombs Where It Ordered Gaza's Civilians to Move for Safety" (The New York Times)	The Whole Story with Anderson Cooper: Going Home: The War in Sudan (CNN); FRONTLINE: "Inside the Uvalde Response" (PBS); FRONTLINE: "The Discord Leaks" (PBS); "Shadow Men: Inside Wagner, Russia's Secret War Company" (The Wall Street Journal); Trafficked with Mariana van Zeller: "Terrorist Oil" (National Geographic)
Outstanding Live News Special	Outstanding Recorded News Special
"A CNN Town Hall: Toxic Train Disaster, Ohio Residents Speak Out" (CNN); The 17th Annual CNN Heroes: An All-Star Tribute (CNN); Good Morning America: "Maui Strong, ABC News, 08/17/23" (ABC); CNN Primetime: "Navalny and the Cost of Standing Up to Putin" (CNN)	20/20: "Our Barbara" (ABC); CBS Reports: "Campaign of Deceit: The Election of George Santos" (CBS); Retro Report: "How Saba Kept Singing" (PBS); "Uvalde: 365 Presents: Crisis of Command" (ABC); CNN Special Report: "The Will to Win: Ukraine at War" (CNN)
Outstanding News Discussion & Analysis	Outstanding News Discussion & Analysis: Editorial and Opinion
Meet The Press Reports: "Guns: Three American Stories" (NBC News NOW); Anderson Cooper 360°: "America Addicted: The Fentanyl Crisis" (CNN); Nightline: "Justice for Tyre" (ABC); The Circus: "Nothing But the Truth" (Showtime); ABC This Week with George Stephanopoulos: "This Week: Live From Tel Aviv" (ABC)	The New York Times Opinion: "Meet the World's Most Honorable Bank Robbers" (The New York Times); "The Night Doctrine" (ProPublica and The New Yorker); The New York Times Opinion: "They Know What They Did. They'd Like You to Know Who They've Become" (The New York Times); "We Went to Puerto Rico: The Inequality We Saw Will Shock You" (More Perfect Union); The New York Times Opinion: "Your Rewards Card is Actually Bad for You, and for Everyone Else" (The New York Times)
Outstanding Live Interview: Short Form	Outstanding Live Interview: Long Form
ABC News Live: "Israeli Leader Speaks Out" (ABC); "A Father's Plea: Interview with Thomas Hand" (CBS); Face the Nation: "Interview with House Speaker Kevin McCarthy" (CBS); Katy Tur Reports: "Interview with Hunter Biden's Attorney Chris Clark" (MSNBC); ABC This Week with George Stephanopoulos: "Interview with The House Majority Leader" (ABC); ABC This Week with George Stephanopoulos: "One on One with John Lauro" (ABC)	Amanpour: "Christiane Amanpour interviews Iranian Foreign Minister Hossein Amir-Abdollahian" (CNN); Amanpour: "Christiane Amanpour interviews Queen Rania Al Abdullah" (CNN); Amanpour: "Christiane Amanpour interviews Siamak Namazi from inside Iran's Evin Prison" (CNN); The Lead with Jake Tapper: "One-on-One with Cassidy Hutchinson" (CNN); ABC News Live Prime with Linsey Davis: "The Death of Tyre Nichols: A Family Speaks" (ABC)
Outstanding Edited Interview	Outstanding Science and Technology Coverage
60 Minutes: "The Hostage Story" (CBS); 60 Minutes: "The Attorney General" (CBS); Fareed Zakaria GPS: "Iranian President Ebrahim Raisi" (CNN); Vice World News Meets: "Imran Khan" (Vice); The Situation Room with Wolf Blitzer: "Wolf Blitzer Interview with Gali Idan in Israel" (CNN)	Trafficked with Mariana van Zeller: "Cyber Pirates" (National Geographic); "CNN's Donie O'Sullivan Covers Science and Technology" (CNN); 60 Minutes: "Revolution" (CBS); In Real Life: "Voices of Nature" (Scripps News); The Future with Hannah Fry: "Weaponization of Data" (Bloomberg)
Outstanding Climate, Environment and Weather Coverage	Outstanding Health or Medical Coverage
Fault Lines: "The Shark Fin Hunters" (Al Jazeera); The Future with Hannah Fry: "Can We Really Rewild the Planet?" (Bloomberg); The Whole Story with Anderson Cooper: "How to Unscrew a Planet" (CNN); 60 Minutes: "The Sperm Whales of Domenica" (CBS); VICE Special Report: "Toxic Farmland" (Vice)	IMPACT x Nightline: "On the Brink" (Hulu); Trafficked with Mariana van Zeller: "Black Market Organs" (National Geographic); The Whole Story with Anderson Cooper: "Homebirth Journey: Saving Black Moms" (CNN); Transnational: "The Trans Parent Trap" (Vice); The Whole Story with Anderson Cooper: "Without Roe: The New Abortion Landscape" (CNN)
Outstanding Arts, Culture or Entertainment Coverage	Outstanding Business, Consumer or Economic Coverage
"Rap Trap: Hip Hop On Trial" (Hulu); NBC News Digital: "50 Years Fly: The Rise, Fall and Revolution of Hip-Hop Fashion" (NBC); 60 Minutes: "James Nachtwey" (CBS); Soul of a Nation: "The New Face of Hollywood — A Soul of a Nation Presentation" (ABC); Trafficked with Mariana van Zeller: "Fight Clubs" (National Geographic)	Trafficked with Mariana van Zeller: "Black Market Babies" (National Geographic); FRONTLINE: "America's Dangerous Trucks" (PBS); Trafficked with Mariana van Zeller: "Crypto Scams" (National Geographic); VICE Special Report: "Making a Killing: The Chinese Mafia Transforming the Global Drug Trade" (Vice); 60 Minutes: "Our Mistake is Your Responsibility" (CBS); "We Went to East Palestine: What We Saw Will Shock You" (More Perfect Union)
Outstanding Crime and Justice Coverage
"Grand Knighthawk: Infiltrating the KKK" (Hulu); Trafficked with Mariana van Zeller: "Gangs" (National Geographic); Trafficked with Mariana van Zeller: "Ghost Guns" (National Geographic); "Inside Iran: What Happened to Iran's Women-led Uprising?" (Vice); "Stealing Ukraine's Children: Inside Russia's Camps" (Vice)

=== Spanish Language Programming ===
Outstanding News Program in Spanish	Outstanding Journalist in Spanish Language Media
Noticiero Univision (Univision); Al Punto (Univision); Aquí y Ahora (Univision); Despierta America (Univision); Noticias Telemundo (Telemundo)	Pedro Ultreras (Univision); Victor Andrade (Entravision Communications); Albert Martinez (The Weather Channel en Español); Jorge Ramos (Univision); Julio Vaqueiro (Telemundo)
Outstanding Coverage of a Breaking News Story in Spanish	Outstanding Investigative News Coverage in Spanish
Noticias Telemundo: "Huracan Otis – Furia Repentina" (Telemundo); Noticiero Univision: "Acapulco Devastado por Otis" (Univision); Aquí y Ahora: "Acuérdate de Acapulco" (Univision); Aquí y Ahora: "Guerra en tierra Santa" (Univision); Noticiero Univision: "Guerra Israel-Hamás" (Univision)	N+ FOCUS: "Las Armas de Ovidio" (VIX / TelevisaUnivision); Aquí y Ahora: "Fentanilo llega a la escuela" (Univision); Decisiones: Datos y Cambio Climático (The Weather Channel en Español); Noticiero Univision: "Executions in Tamaulipas" (Univision); N+ FOCUS: "Si no pagas, no pasas" (VIX | TelevisaUnivision)
Outstanding Feature Story in Spanish
"Los buscadores de migrantes perdidos en el desierto de Sonora" (BBC Mundo); Fault Lines: "The Confession" (Al Jazeera); Univision News Digital: "No me olvides: el creciente drama del alzhéimer en la comunidad hispana" (Univision); En Punto: "Río de Armas, Dinero y Muerte" (VIX); Op-Docs: "Victoria" (The New York Times)

=== Documentary Programming ===
Best Documentary	Outstanding Arts and Culture Documentary
Lakota Nation vs. United States (AMC+); FRONTLINE: "Elon Musk's Twitter Takeover" (PBS); Independent Lens: "Free Chol Soo Lee" (PBS); Freedom on Fire: Ukraine's Fight for Freedom (freedomonfire.film); Great Photo, Lovely Life: Facing a Family's Secrets (HBO / Max); Independent Lens: "Hidden Letters" (PBS); January 6th (Discovery+); Mourning in Lod (Showtime); Murder in Boston: Roots, Rampage, and Reckoning (HBO / Max); The Stroll (HBO / Max)	Little Richard: I Am Everything (CNN Films / Max); A Song Film by Kishi Bashi – ‘Omoiyari’: (Paramount+); The New York Times Presents: "The Legacy of J. Dilla" (FX); LIFT (liftdocumentary.com); Willie Nelson & Family (Paramount+)
Outstanding Current Affairs Documentary	Outstanding Social Issue Documentary
Poisoned: The Dirty Truth About Your Food (Netflix); Loudmouth (BET; Independent Lens: "Love in the Time of Fentanyl" (PBS); Mourning in Lod (Showtime); No Accident (HBO / Max)	POV: "Eat Your Catfish" (PBS); Anonymous Sister (anonymoussister.com); David Holmes: The Boy Who Lived (HBO / Max); Every Body (NBC); Sound of the Police (Hulu)
Outstanding Politics and Government Documentary	Outstanding Business and Economic Documentary
FRONTLINE: "Clarence and Ginni Thomas: Politics, Power and the Supreme Court" (PBS); Deadlocked: How America Shaped the Supreme Court (Showtime); American Masters: "Floyd Abrams: Speaking Freely" (PBS); Giuliani: What Happened to America's Mayor (CNN); Superpower (Paramount+)	Big Vape: The Rise and Fall of Juul (Netflix); FRONTLINE: "Age of Easy Money" (PBS); FRONTLINE: "Elon Musk's Twitter Takeover" (PBS); Nothing Lasts Forever (Showtime); Working: What We Do All Day (Netflix)
Outstanding Investigative Documentary	Outstanding Historical Documentary
FRONTLINE: "Global Spyware Scandal: Exposing Pegasus" (PBS); Crush (Paramount+); Savior Complex (HBO / Max); Scouts Honor: The Secret Files of the Boy Scouts of America (Netflix); Victim/Suspect (Netflix)	Independent Lens: "Free Chol Soo Lee" (PBS); FRONTLINE: "America and The Taliban" (PBS); JFK: One Day in America (National Geographic); MSNBC Films: "To End All War: Oppenheimer & the Atomic Bomb" (MSNBC); World War II: From the Front Lines (Netflix)
Outstanding Science and Technology Documentary	Outstanding Nature Documentary
Science Fair: The Series (National Geographic); NOVΛ: "The Battle to Beat Malaria" (PBS); Unknown: "Cosmic Time Machine" (Netflix); Encounters (Netflix); Human Footprint (PBS)	Path of the Panther (National Geographic); Evolution Earth (PBS); Nature: "The Hummingbird Effect" (PBS); Incredible Animal Journeys (National Geographic); Nature: "Soul of the Ocean" (PBS)
Outstanding Crime and Justice Documentary	Outstanding Short Documentary
Murder in Boston: Roots, Rampage, and Reckoning (HBO | Max); Amber: The Girl Behind the Alert (Peacock); Chowchilla (CNN Films / Max); Independent Lens: "El Equipo" (PBS); Wanted: The Escape of Carlos Ghosn (Apple TV+)	The Silent Witness (Life Stories); Birthing A Nation: The Resistance of Mary Gaffney (Paramount+); The New Yorker Documentary: "Deciding Vote" (The New Yorker); Last Song From Kabul (Paramount+); The Takeover (Field of Vision)

=== Craft ===
Outstanding Video Journalism: News	Outstanding Cinematography: Documentary
Trafficked with Mariana van Zeller: "Terrorist Oil" – Frederic Menou, Joshua Flannigan (National Geographic); "Exclusive: Inside a Ukrainian Battlefield Hospital" – Yousur Al-Hlou (The New York Times); Trafficked with Mariana van Zeller: "Ghost Guns" – Frederic Menou, Joshua Flannigan, Garret Smith (National Geographic); Trafficked with Mariana van Zeller: "MDMA" – Frederic Menou, Joshua Flannigan (National Geographic); The Whole Story with Anderson Cooper: "The Trek: A Migrant's Trail to America" – Brice Laine (CNN)	Murder in Big Horn – Jeff Hutchens (Showtime); Incredible Animal Journeys – Tom Beldam, Simon de Glanville, Justin Hofman, Pete McCowen, Sam Meyrick, Simon Niblett, Miguel Willis, Rapha Boudreault-Simard (National Geographic); Unknown: "The Lost Pyramid" – Paul Krisop, Jason Lee Wong, James Mills, Zaid Kanaan, Valentin Le Glaunec, Adrian Ramirez, Max Salomon (Netflix); The Pigeon Tunnel – Igor Martinović, Eszter Csepeli, Ilana Garrard, Péter Kotschy, Henry Landgrebe, Nic Milner, Márton Ragály (Apple TV+); The New Yorker Documentary: "Swift Justice" – Victor Blue, Ross McDonnell (The New Yorker)
Outstanding Direction: News	Outstanding Direction: Documentary
ABC News Soul of a Nation: "Black in Vegas" – Tine Fields (ABC); ABC News Soul of a Nation: "The Freedom to Exist" – Tine Fields (ABC); Trafficked with Mariana van Zeller: "Ghost Guns" – Eric Strauss (National Geographic); Good Morning America: 08/17/2023 "GMA's Maui Strong" – Liliana Olszewski, Joseph Beltrano, Camp Childers, John Dubon, Gary Mace, Kevin Rhodes, Brad Hennessy, Eddie Luisi, Dennis Mazzocco, Kecia Stewart (ABC News); TODAY: "October 9, 2023" – Lee Miller, Erica Levins, Mike Torello, Dave Auerbach, Yosef Herzog, Chris Reilly, Zach Schiffman (NBC)	Lakota Nation vs. United States – Jesse Short Bull, Laura Tomaselli (AMC+); Another Body – Sophie Tara Compton, Reuben Hamlyn (anotherbodyfilm.com); The Mission – Amanda McBaine, Jesse Moss (National Geographic); Take Care of Maya – Henry Roosevelt (Netflix); Victim/Suspect – Nancy Schwartzman (Netflix)
Outstanding Editing: News	Outstanding Editing: Documentary
Trafficked with Mariana van Zeller: "Ghost Guns" – Hunter Gross, Alex Hill, Jeremy Presner (National Geographic); FRONTLINE: "Failure at the Fence" – Sarah Cahlan, Fanny Lee (PBS); "Grand Knighthawk: Infiltrating the KKK" – Joe LoBianco (Hulu); 20/20: "It Happened Here: A Year in Uvalde" – Jeannine Brown, Gina Caruana, Nick Damiano, Robert J. Ferrari II, Joe LoBianco, Kozo Okumura, Art Vizthum (ABC); Trafficked with Mariana van Zeller: "MDMA" – Christian Glawe, Hunter Gross (National Geographic)	American Manhunt: The Boston Marathon Bombing – Patrick Nelson Barnes, Will Butler, Michael Griffin, John-Michael Powell, Nate Gross (Netflix); David Holmes: The Boy Who Lived – Kevin Konak (HBO / Max); Little Richard: I Am Everything – Jake Hostetter, Nyneve Minnear (CNN Films / Max); Murder in Boston: Roots, Rampage, and Reckoning – Ross Hockrow, Nikolai Johnson (HBO / Max); The Pigeon Tunnel – Steven Hathaway (Apple TV+)
Outstanding Graphic Design: News	Outstanding Graphic Design: Documentary
The Night Doctrine – Mauricio Rodríguez Pons (ProPublica and The New Yorker); NBC News Digital: "50 Years Fly: The Rise, Fall and Revolution of Hip-Hop Fashion" – Michael Basillico, Livia Lenhoff (NBC); "You Deny, Deny, Deny, Until It Becomes Untenable: A Soldier's Struggle with PTSD" – Kelly Flynn, Agne Jurkenaite, Taylor Su (CNN); Meet the Press – Ventura Castro, Marc E Greenstein, Phillip DeSimone, Tara Devlin, Claudia Flechas, Romina Giarrizzo, Joseph McDonald, Humbert Perez, Daniel Russo, Marco Salemi, Stanley Wong, Alberto Zayas, Alex Belenkiy, Nol Honig, Laura Mekiou, Art Mkrtchyan, Sheila Sullivan, Greg VanWhy, Kwane Antwi, Compton Belle Jr., Bryan Drake, Barry Herzner, Andreas Minas, Josh Monesson, Daniel Rainville, Chung Wu (NBC); NBC News Digital: "Stay Tuned" – Thomas Parrinello, Madelene Wikskaer, Alejandro Escobar, Michael Basillico, Livia Lenhoff (NBC); Hoy Día: "Texas Tornado Virtual Explainer" – Fabian Albarracin, Ricdamis Garcia, Emilio Pimentel, Mariloly Fernandez, Carlos Robles, Daniel Soriano, Frank Batista, Luis Diaz, Arnaldo Estrada, Ulises Garcia, Edwin Lopez, Carlos Perez, Osmany Gomez, Carlos Rivero (Telemundo)	World War II: From the Front Lines – Duncan Elms, Kennon Fleisher, Cindy Soohoo, Steve Biggert, Filipe Carvalho, Steven Do, Lynn Kim, Steve Biggert, Tim Devlin, Steven Do, Kennon Fleisher, Lucy Kim, Peter Murphy, Steve Savalle, Alex Silver, Cindy SooHoo, Mert Kizilay, Steve Savalle, Alex Silver (Netflix); NOVΛ: "Ancient Earth" – Simon Clarke, Thomas Barnett-Welch, Scott Metcalfe, Rosanna Thorn-Lees, Moonraker VFX, Graham Stott (PBS); Op-Docs: "Neighbour Abdi" – Bas Koopmans, Douwe Dijkstra, Edo van Doorne (The New York Times); Nixon's Reversal – Bruna Ayako Imai, Rafael Morinaga, Diego Coutinho de Souza (Ovid); Who Killed Robert Wone? – Jared P. Scott, Eric Wetherington, Sean Donnelly, Lisa Bolan, Albert Corona (Peacock)
Outstanding Research: News	Outstanding Research: Documentary
The Associated Press: "Adrift: An AP Investigation" – Renata Brito, Felipe Dana (apnews.com); FRONTLINE: "Failure at the Fence" – Shakked Auerbach, Sarah Cahlan, Tim Grucza, Evan Hill, Meg Kelly, Imogen Piper, Kitty Samuels, Gabrielle Schonder, Joyce Sohyun Lee, Jon Swaine (PBS); Fentanyl: The Silent Toll – Brittany Freeman, Lori Jane Gilha (Scripps News); FRONTLINE: "Inside the Uvalde Response" – Juanita Cellabos, Lexi Churchill, Zach Despart, Jinitzail Hernández, Lomi Kriel, Michelle Mizner, Lauren Prestileo, Zahira Torres (PBS); 60 Minutes: "The Looting of Cambodia" – Eliza Costas, Michael H. Gavshon, Nadim Roberts (CBS)	Victim/Suspect – Sarah Cohen, Rachel de Leon, Skyler Glover, Kendall Marianacci, Betty Marquez, Elena Neale-Sacks, Vanessa Ochavillo, Sinduja Rangarajan (Netflix); FRONTLINE: "Global Spyware Scandal: Exposing Pegasus" – Arthur Bouvart, Paloma Dupont de Dinechin, Anne Poiret, Laurent Richard, Sandrine Rigaud, Phineas Rueckert, Cécile Schilis-Gallego (PBS); JFK: One Day in America – Margarett Backett, Sophie Dimitriadis, Henry Longden, Charlotte Rodrigues, Ella Wright (National Geographic); Take Care of Maya – Caitlin Keating (Netflix); The Lady Bird Diaries – Michelle Ngo, Isabel Dorval, Susanne Mason, Adam Pincus, Dawn Porter, Kim Reynolds, Alisa Selman, Julia Sweig, Victoria Thompson, Benjamin Zweig (Hulu); World War II: From the Front Lines – Sophia Doe, Jack Penman, Dinah Rogers, Ross Booker, Rob Coldstream, David Glover, Jessica Ives, Woody Ledeboer, Caroline Marsden, Tom McCarthy, Rosie Potter (Netflix)
Outstanding Lighting Direction: News	Outstanding Lighting Direction: Documentary
Trafficked with Mariana van Zeller: "MDMA" – Frederic Menou, Joshua Flannigan (National Geographic); The 17th Annual CNN Heroes: An All-Star Tribute – Stephen Brill, Declan Moore, Sheryl Wisniewski, Mike Appel, Kevin Johnson, Valentina Migoulia (CNN); Trafficked with Mariana van Zeller: "Ghost Guns" – Frederic Menou, Joshua Flannigan, Garret Smith (National Geographic); ABC News Live: "The Playlist" – Peter Greenbaum (ABC)	MSNBC Films: "To End All War: Oppenheimer & the Atomic Bomb" – Tim Metzger (MSNBC); ID: Investigation: "Homicide Hunter: The Man With No Face" – Daniel Kelly, Michael Gallagher (Discovery); JFK: One Day in America – Brandon Widener (National Geographic); Who Killed Robert Wone? – Luke Geissbuhler, Mike Gallagher, Scott Perryman (Peacock); Wild Crime: Blood Mountain – Ezra Miguel Wolfinger (Hulu)
Outstanding Music Composition: News	Outstanding Music Composition: Documentary
The Night Doctrine – Milad Yousufi (ProPublica and The New Yorker); CNN News Central – Stephen Arnold Music (CNN); FRONTLINE: "The Discord Leaks" – Griffin Jennings (PBS)	World War II: From the Front Lines – David Schweitzer (Netflix); David Holmes: The Boy Who Lived – Tandis Jenhudson (HBO / Max); Freedom on Fire: Ukraine's Fight for Freedom – Jasha Klebe (freedomonfire.film); JFK: One Day in America – Sam Thompson (National Geographic); Navajo Police: Class 57 – Tyler Strickland (HBO / Max)
Outstanding Sound: News	Outstanding Sound: Documentary
The Whole Story with Anderson Cooper: "The Trek: A Migrant's Trail to America" – Brice Laine (CNN); Trafficked with Mariana van Zeller: "Black Market Babies" – Matthew Ritenour, Cameron Tacey, Tyler Proctor, Josh Banach, Paul Hollman (National Geographic); Trafficked with Mariana van Zeller: "Black Market Organs" – Tim Haber, Chris Testa, Dana Olsefsky, Josh Banach, Paul Hollman (National Geographic); Trafficked with Mariana van Zeller: "MDMA" – Tim Haber, Garret Smith, Paul Hollman, Dana Olsefsk, Josh Banach (National Geographic)	Incredible Animal Journeys – Andy Devine, Chris Domaille, Ian Bown, James Burchill, Jonathon Cawte, Michael Bouska (National Geographic); Big Beasts – Ian Bown, Roy Noy, Chris Domaille, Brian Moseley, Josh Minyard, Ruskin Williamson (Apple TV+); Freedom on Fire: Ukraine's Fight for Freedom – Kostiantyn Stepanov, Volodymyr Kripak, Andrey Vdovichenko, Andrey Halchenko, Volodymyr Dubas, Vadym Stoliar, Oleg Kulchytsky (freedomonfire.film); The New York Times Presents: "The Legacy of J. Dilla" – Andre Artis, Andre Bottesi, Danny Hammer, Michael Lile, Marcus Pena, Sara Sandoval, Matthew Sisco, Lou Teti (FX); Unknown: "The Lost Pyramid" – Rafael T Benvenuti, Mario Dipoi, Fernando Henna, Mohamed Hassan, Mohamed Ibrahim Taha, Danilo Chen, Rene Hendrick, Alexandre Vaz, Stanley Gilman, Eber Pinheiro (Netflix)
Outstanding Writing: News	Outstanding Writing: Documentary
The Whole Story with Anderson Cooper: "The Trek: A Migrant's Trail to America" – Nick Paton Walsh (CNN); FRONTLINE: "After Uvalde: Guns, Grief & Texas Politics" – Amy Bucher, Heidi Burke (PBS); 60 Minutes: "This Ancient Atrocity" – Scott Pelley, Henry Schuster, Sarah Turcotte (CBS); "Clarissa Ward's Exclusive Report From Inside Gaza" – Scott McWhinnie, Brent Swails, Clarissa Ward (CNN); 20/20: "It Happened Here: A Year in Uvalde" – Joseph Diaz, Denise Martinez-Ramundo, Kieran McGirl, Brian Mezerski, Erin Murtha, Elissa Stohler (ABC)	Nazis at Nuremberg: The Lost Testimony – Liz Reph (National Geographic); Exposing Parchman – Jeanmarie Condon (A&E); Great Photo, Lovely Life: Facing a Family's Secrets – Rachel Beth Anderson, Josef Beeby, Amanda Mustard, Tyler H. Walk (HBO / Max); FRONTLINE: "Netanyahu, America & the Road to War in Gaza" – Anya Bourg, James Jacoby (PBS); The Pigeon Tunnel – Errol Morris (Apple TV+)
Outstanding Art Direction / Set Decoration / Scenic Design: News	Outstanding Art Direction / Set Decoration / Scenic Design: Documentary
The 17th Annual CNN Heroes: An All-Star Tribute – Emmett Aiello, Amir Anderson, Corey Atwood, Sharon Braunstein, Jodie Ellstrom, Tristan James, Adrienne Kapalko, Jonathan Kemp, Daniel Kershner, Pete Knudsen, Deana Mounajjed, Alan Reese, Nia Ulfers, Erik Ulfers, Murat Ustuner (CNN); Soul of a Nation: "Hip Hop @50: Rhythms, Rhymes with & Reflection" – Kavin Bartles, James Holbrook, Tine Fields, Marshall Rose (ABC)	Stan Lee – T. Hunter McCann, Danielle Lopez (Disney+); Burden of Proof – Sarah Costello, David Downie, Mollie Earls, Shannon Hall, David Hewlette, Ashley Hutchinson, Margaret McNealy, Chris Musina, Rexana Neyland, Alli Rogers, Nona Stell (HBO / Max); Chowchilla – Robb Wilson King (CNN Films / Max); The Enfield Poltergeist – Jacky Fey, Laura Lily Smith, Natalie O'Connor (Apple TV+); Madoff: The Monster of Wall Street – Ivan Hurzeler, Nika Gil, Nadya Gurevich, Bryan Hodge (Netflix); Who Killed Robert Wone? – Lisa Bolan, Andrew McKeown, Jared P. Scott, Eric Wetherington, Kelly Grace Sullivan, Ian Goodman, Chelsea Pitti-Fernandez (Peacock)
Outstanding Promotional Announcement: News	Outstanding Promotional Announcement: Documentary
60 Minutes: "It's Time for..." (CBS); "After the Blast: The Will to Survive" (ABC); "Jeremy Renner: The Diane Sawyer Interview – A Story of Terror, Survival and Triumph" (ABC); CBS News Face the Nation: "Moderator" (CBS); The CBS Evening News with Norah O'Donnell: "Power" (CBS)	JFK: One Day in America (National Geographic); Giuliani: What Happened to America's Mayor (CNN); Incredible Animal Journeys (National Geographic); The Mission (National Geographic); Independent Lens: Teaser for "Free Chol Soo Lee on Independent Lens" (PBS); Trailer for The Lady Bird Diaries (Hulu)
Outstanding Technical Excellence: News
Tracking Idalia: "FloodFX – Florida Storms (Idalia)" – Mike Chesterfield, Craig Chupinsky, Matt Sitkowski, Nick Weinmiller, Craig McMahon, Michael Potts, Nora Zimmett, Evan Ingram, Jon Johnson, Kyung Ko, Nick Loy, Cesar Moncada, James Naugle, Dan Parsons, Melvin Rice, Abena Trotman, Paco Vergachette, Jeff Wyner, Matt Alexy, Tangela Greene, Bryan Reddish, Adam Dieter, Patrick Faulkner, David Huck, Barrington Marson, Ralph Prado, Tyler Shook, Sean Stevenson, David Trott, Devin Wheeler, Rob Williams, Russ Aaron, Ryan Bowles, Brian Bruck, Steve Fahey, Eric Fletcher, Ethan Smith, Debba White, Anthony Ayers, Jermaine Evans, Gary Hood, Mark Howard, Michael Jackson, Andrew Maloof, Michael McNamara, Dennis Nesbit, David Schulte, Michael Smereski, John Hallden (The Weather Channel); CNN's Fourth in America – Chris Brown, Charlie Chester, Sean Clark, Brian Decker, Danny Figueroa, Matthew Jacobson, Brett Kelly, Christine Kupillas, Marshall Leaman, Justin Mcclimans, Jose Nunez, Paul Palaruan, Jackie Parsons, Kelly Pearsall, Gina Pepe, Chris Walter, Jeff Watts, Chuck Parker, Chris Cross, Jason Greenspan, Derek St Onge, David Allbritton, Bob Angele, Chris Audick, Frank Bivona, Andy Buck, Gregg Canes, Jake Carpenter, Stuart Clark, Wayne Cross, Bob Crowley, Styke Dimas, Rod Griola, Adolfo Ibarra, Walter Imparato, Leon Jobe, Damir Loretic, Steve Machalek, Carlos Martinelli, Doug Mckinley, Jay Mcmichael, Carmaine Means, Kevin Myers, Ty Nguyen, Effie Nidam, Jonathan O'Beirne, Josh Replogle, Adrian Reyes, Darren Rode, John Rubenstahl, Orlando Ruiz, Jake Scheuer, Harlan Schmidt, Randy Slavin, Andrew Smith, Amanda Swinhart, Ken Tillis, Chris Turner, William Walker, Steve Williams, Taka Yokoyama, Christopher Scott, Kenzi Tainow, Kristen Alden, Nicole Brooks, Devin Harris, David Horslev, Jonathan Kemp, Gary Krakower, Lisa Myers, Jameson Stewart, Ed Taragano, Ruby Williams, Jerry Appleman, Chad Audino, Michael Berman, Lindsey Cobb, Timothy Daoust, Clayton Green, Marc Halualani, Wes Little, Ben Meyer, John Beyer, Kevin Blakley, James F Clarke, Bobby Clemons, EJ Jeroro, Jeff Moller, Eric Odendahl, Andre Parker, Edwin Peregrina, Alejandro Peruga, Greg Pocali, Richard Sinclair, Scott Stead, Thanh Tram, Dawid Vermaak, David Conwell, Lorenzo Dottori, Kenny Harris, Michael Humphrey, Mati Kerpen, Max Lewis, James Meech, Al Meshberg, Steve Mills, Michael Oat, Bill Otoole, LiKeith Robbins, Chris Stewart, John Tenke, BRYON Wallington, Dan Zackim, Carlos Linares, Lee Carroll, Joseph Bonheim, Will Brown, Emily Goodwin, Laura Robinson, Dominic Swann, Alexa Bennewitz, Noah Gray, Jessica Jordan, Vivian Kuo, Kara Manry, Sara Rudolph, Emily Rust, Reza Baktar, Ray Britch, Eric Brodsky, Lois Cioffi, John Davies, Amy Destefan, Tom Ebel, Nicole Fisher, David Foote, Jorge Galvez, Brian Gassen, Alex Gee, Jeff Grogan, Stacy Hietala, Jason Hochheimer, Adia Jacobs, Kimberly James, Oliver Janney, Jerilyn Jaskowiak, Christ Khodadadi, Stuart Lyncook, Eva Marble, Bill Mclaughlin, Ryan Pollock, Doug Schantz, Greg Seaby, Amanda Torppey, Rabab Turabi, Brooke Turnbull, Paul Vitale, Mark Walz, Carlos Arboleda, Billy Bennett, Quentin Dunn, Kriston Lewis, Sam Meyer, Ted Severson, Gustavo Villalonga, Adam Ferguson (CNN); ABC World News Tonight with David Muir: "Earthquake in Turkey" – Faruna Sanoon, Jamie Baker, Nicky DeBlois, Max Karmen, Dale West, Karen Langley, Magnus Macedo, Jeff Fitzgerald, John Katrus, Paul Kaltenbach, Dhanraj Mangal, Christopher McGuire, Philip Morrison, John Prendergast (ABC)

=== Regional News ===
Outstanding Regional News Story: Breaking/Spot News	Outstanding Regional News Story: Investigative
"December Tornado Outbreak" – Brandon Decareaux, Morgan Lentes, Jennifer Crockett, Darryl Forges, Aubry Killion, Fletcher Mackel, Cassandra Schirm, Melissa Dart, Romni Williams, Margaret Orr, Devon Lucie, Sula Kim (WDSU – New Orleans, Louisiana / Suncoast Chapter); "CVPA School Shooting" – Cassandra Hall, Kaitlyn Estopare, Chris Hayes, Laura Simon, Mike Colombo, Kim Hudson, Glen Seibold, John Brubaker, Doug Larson, Dave Sharp (FTVI – St. Louis, Missouri / Mid-America Chapter); "The Day That Changed Half Moon By Forever" – Lindsay Nakano, Amanda Del Castillo, Dustin Dorsey, Gloria Rodríguez, J.R. Stone, Dan Ashley, Ama Daetz (KGO-TV – San Francisco, California / San Francisco / Northern California Chapter); "Maud Tornado Hits Grow House" – David Payne, Lacey Swope, Kylie Frakes, Jim Gardner (KWTV-DT – Oklahoma City, Oklahoma / Heartlands Chapter); "MSU Campus Shooting" – Clarence Stone, Faraz Javed, Keenan Smith, Alicia Smith (WXYZ-TV – Detroit, Michigan / Michigan Chapter)	"Disabled & Denied" – Carolyn Peirce, Ray Rogowski, Chris Papst, Jed Gamber, Dwayne Myers (WBFF – Baltimore, Maryland / National Capital / Chesapeake Bay Chapter); "911: Hanging on the Line" – Sean Myers, Candice Nguyen, Kevin Nious, Michael Horn (KNTV – San Francisco, California / San Francisco / Northern California Chapter); "Drained" – Dannah Sauer, Lee Zurik, Jon Turnipseed (WVUE-DT – New Orleans, Louisiana / Suncoast Chapter); "Mentally Ill, Waiting in Jail" – Eric Derosiers, Kellen Harrel, Susannah Frame, Kevin Glantz (KING-TV – Seattle, Washington / Northwest Chapter); "WFAA Investigates: Broken Trust" – Mark Smith, Tanya Eiserer, Rick Rysso (WFAA – Dallas, Texas / Lone Star Chapter)
Outstanding Regional Documentary
The Lost Story of Emmett Till: Then and Now – Dana Anderson, Lisa Balde, Marion Brooks, Akemi Harrison, Tom Jones, G. Riley Mills, Anthony Moseley, Willie Round, DS Shin, Lauren Stauffer (WMAQ-TV / Chicago / Midwest Chapter); BURNED: Six Hours in December – Christopher Hansen (KUSA / Heartlands Chapter); The Cop Who Wouldn't Quit – Laura Taglialavore, Jessica Willey, Chris Graczyk (KTRK / Lone Star Chapter); Fossil Country – Terry Dugas, Beth Hames, Mat Hames, Sandra Guardado, Spencer Peeple (Alpheus Media / Heartlands Chapter); Learned Helplessness – Anthony Durso, Jed Gamber, Chris Papst, Carolyn Peirce, Ray Rogowski (WBFF / National Capital / Chesapeake Bay Chapter); A New Home – Joseph Puleo, Rio Vitale (Caleo Productions / Mid-America Chapter)

=== International News & Current Affairs ===
News	Current Affairs
Channel 4 News: "Israel-Hamas at War" (United Kingdom) (Channel 4 News); GloboNews & RJ2: "Secret Payrolls" (Brazil) (TV Globo); Tragediata v lokorsko (Bulgaria) (Nova); War on Gaza (Qatar) (Al Jazeera English)	Sky News: "The Last Hospital: 30 Days in Myanmar" (United Kingdom) (Sky News); GloboNews Documentary: "Evel, Hazin: Days of Mourning" (Brazil) (TV Globo); The Trap: India's Deadliest Scam (India) (BBC India Eye); UVDA with Ilana Dayan: "Brother & Sister in Captivity" (Israel) (UVDA Ltd. / Keshet Media Group)
