= Hot Docs Canadian International Documentary Festival =

- Location: Toronto, Ontario, Canada
- Founded: 1993 by the Documentary Organization of Canada
- Language: English
- Website: hotdocs.ca

The Hot Docs Canadian International Documentary Festival is the largest documentary festival in North America. The event takes place annually in Toronto, Ontario, Canada. The 27th edition of the festival took place online throughout May and June 2020. In addition to the annual festival, Hot Docs owns and operates the Hot Docs Ted Rogers Cinema, administers multiple production funds, and runs year-round screening programs including Doc Soup and Hot Docs Showcase.

In 2026, the festival gained accreditation from FIAPF.

== History ==
Hot Docs was founded in 1993 by the Documentary Organization of Canada, a national association of independent filmmakers, previously known as the Canadian Independent Film Caucus. Paul Jay, then chair of the CIFC, was the founding board chairperson and Debbie Nightingale was the event producer.

The first event was held from February 24 to 27, 1994, including the first industry conference and the National Documentary Film Awards. 20 films of the line-up were screened at the AGO’s Jackman Hall auditorium and the NFB screening room at Richmond and John, while the opening film, André Mathieu, musicien by Jean-Claude Labrecque, was screened at the Bloor Cinema. In 1995, the festival grew to 29 films.

In 1996, Hot Docs separated from the DOC to become an individual entity with a mandate to showcase and support the work of Canadian and international documentary filmmakers and to promote excellence in documentary production. That year's edition had 52 films in the line-up. In 1998, Chris McDonald, formerly of the Canadian Film Centre, was hired as its first full-time employee, eventually rising to become president of the festival in 2014.

The 2020 festival was postponed due to the COVID-19 pandemic in Canada. In April, the organization partner with CBC Television on the short-run series Hot Docs at Home, which broadcast several Canadian documentary films that had been slated to premiere at the festival. In May, Hot Docs launched an online version of the Festival and its own Hot Docs at Home screening platform.

The 2021 Hot Docs Festival was originally expected to be a hybrid event, but remained online. In 2022, the festival returned to accepting live audiences.

McDonald stepped down as festival president in 2023, to be succeeded by Marie Nelson. Also in 2023, Hussain Currimbhoy was appointed new artistic director of Hot Docs, succeeding Shane Smith, while Heather Haynes became the director of festival programming. In March 2024, Currimbhoy stepped down as artistic director after just a few months in the role, amid allegations of mismanagement and toxic behaviour that had led much of the programming team to resign en masse weeks before the 2024 festival. Many of the programmers who quit in March rejoined the programming team in October after the board implemented a restructuring plan under Haynes's leadership.

The 30th anniversary edition of the festival was marked by a record 2848 submissions and 214 screenings.

In March 2025, the festival named Diana Sanchez, a former programmer for the Toronto International Film Festival, as its new executive director. In September, Gabor Pertic was named Lead Programmer.

== Festival ==
Each year, the festival screens over 200 documentaries from countries around the world. In addition to the Canadian and international competitive programs, each festival includes themed programs along with Outstanding Achievement Award and Focus On retrospective programs.

Official selections are divided into sections or programs. Recurring programs include:

- Canadian Spectrum – A competitive program of Canadian stories and perspectives
- International Spectrum – A competitive program of world and international premieres
- Artscapes – A showcase for the arts, creativity, music and pop culture
- Big Ideas – Screenings of films with thought-provoking issues, followed by an extended discussion with notable guest subjects and experts
- Made In – A selection of films celebrating a selected country or region
- Special Presentations – Award-winning films, celebrated filmmakers, high-profile subjects and special screenings
- World Showcase – A popular global selection of docs

Additionally, each festival includes two to three theme programs that showcase documentaries united by a topic, subject or issue.

=== Industry Conference & Market ===
During each festival, Hot Docs hosts an industry conference featuring sessions and workshops, along with market events like the Hot Docs Forum and Deal Maker where filmmakers can connect with more than 2,000 delegates, including commissioning editors, programmers, filmmakers, buyers and distributors from all over the world.

==== Hot Docs Forum ====
Founded in 2000 as the Toronto Documentary Forum, the Hot Docs Forum has established itself as North America's essential international documentary market event. Taking place over two days, the forum sees pre-selected international projects present to a round-table of leading international commissioning editors, film fund representatives, financiers, programming executives and delegates.

Pitch prizes are also awarded during the Forum, including the Corus-Hot Docs Forum pitch prize, awarding a $10,000 cash prize to be used by the winning team for the production and completion budget for their project; the Cuban Hat Award, providing "real cash, no strings attached" money raised during the Hot Docs Forum; and first look Pitch Prizes as part of a curated access program for philanthropic supporters of and investors in documentary film.

Notable Hot Docs Forum participants include Lars von Trier's The Five Obstructions, Ari Folman's Golden Globe-winning Waltz with Bashir, Cari Green and Mark Achbar's The Corporation, David France's How to Survive a Plague, Frederick Wiseman's In Jackson Heights and Sean Fine and Andrea Nix's Academy Award-winning Inocente.

=== Awards ===
Each year, the festival recognizes the top Canadian and international films in official selection for feature, mid-length and short documentary. There are also Canadian and international emerging filmmaker awards, along with industry prizes and audience awards. At the 2019 Festival, $235,000 in cash and prizes was awarded.

Hot Docs is recognized as a qualifying festival for the Academy Awards® in the Documentary Feature and Documentary Short Subject categories. The winner of Hot Docs' Best International Feature Documentary Award qualifies for consideration for the Oscar for Documentary Feature, and the winner of Hot Docs' Best Canadian and International Short Documentary Awards qualify for consideration for the Oscar for Documentary Short Subject without standard theatrical runs.

The festival also presents juried awards for Best Canadian Short Documentary (Betty Youson Award) and Best International Short Documentary, and Emerging Canadian Filmmaker (Earl A. Glick Award) and Emerging International Filmmaker.

==== Audience Awards ====
There are several audience awards at the Hot Docs Festival. The Hot Docs Audience Award, Hot Docs DocX Audience Award and Rogers Audience Award for Best Canadian Documentary are all selected by audience ballot. The Hot Docs Audience Award and DocX Audience award are announced the day after the Festival closes. The Rogers Audience Award for Best Canadian Documentary was established in 2017. It is announced at an encore screening of the winning film on the final Sunday of the festival, and includes at $50,000 prize courtesy of Rogers Group of Funds.

Past winners of the Hot Docs Audience Award include The Backward Class (2014), Unbranded (2015), and Angry Inuk (2016). At the 2017 and 2018 Festivals, one film took both the Hot Docs Audience Award and the Rogers Audience Award: Rumble: The Indians Who Rocked the World in 2017 and Transformer in 2018.

In 2020, to help mitigate the impact of the COVID-19 pandemic on film promotion and distribution, festival organizers opted to split the Rogers Audience Award among all of the top five Canadian films rather than naming a single winner. The films The Walrus and the Whistleblower, 9/11 Kids, The Forbidden Reel, First We Eat and There's No Place Like This Place, Anyplace were each awarded $10,000, while the Jury Award was presented to the film Prayer for a Lost Mitten.

The Scotiabank Docs For Schools Student Choice Award is determined by audience ballot at Docs For Schools in-cinema screenings, and includes a $5,000 prize courtesy of Scotiabank. The Student Choice Award is announced the day after the festival closes.

==== Special awards ====
Each year, the Hot Docs Board of Directors celebrates a distinguished filmmaker and their career with the Hot Docs Outstanding Achievement Award. Recipients include: Barbara Kopple (2018), Tony Palmer (2017), Steve James (2016), Patricio Guzmán (2015), Adam Curtis (2014), Les Blank (2013), Michel Brault (2012), Terence Macartney-Filgate (2011), Kim Longinotto (2010), Alanis Obomsawin (2009), Richard Leacock (2008), Heddy Honigmann (2007), Werner Herzog (2006), Errol Morris (2005), Michael Maclear (2004), Nick Broomfield (2003), Frederick Wiseman (2002), D. A. Pennebaker and Chris Hegedus (2000) and Albert Maysles (1999).

The annual Doc Mogul Award recognizes an individual who has made essential contributions to the creative vitality of the documentary industry over the course of their career. The award is presented by the Hot Docs Board of Directors at a luncheon on the Monday of the festival. Recipients include: Cara Mertes (2018), Monique Simard (2017), Iikka Vehkalahti (2016), Takahiro Hamano (2015), Mette Hoffman Meyer (2014), Debra Zimmerman (2013), Diane Weyermann (2012), Ally Derks (2011), Jan Rofekamp (2010), Sheila Nevins (2009), Nick Fraser (2008), and Rudy Buttignol (2007).

The Don Haig Award is presented to a Canadian producer with a film in the festival, and recognizes creative vision and entrepreneurship. The winner receives at $10,000 cash prize courtesy of the Don Haig Foundation and Telefilm Canada; and the recipient also awards $5,000 to an emerging female documentary filmmaker of their choice to support career development.

In honour of her legacy, the Lindalee Tracey Award is presented to an emerging Canadian filmmaker. The winner receives a $5,000 cash prize from the Lindalee Tracey Fund, $5,000 in post-production services and a specially commissioned, hand-blown glass sculpture by Andrew Kuntz.

==== Industry Awards ====
Each year at the Hot Docs Forum, three types of pitch prizes are awarded to projects:

- first look Pitch Prizes – Two to three projects receive a total of more than $100,0000, which is awarded by the first look participants.
- Hot Docs Corus Pitch Prize – A $10,000 prize, disbursed from the Corus-Hot Docs Funds, which is awarded to the best Canadian Forum pitch, as voted by attending international buyers.
- Cuban Hat Award – A no-strings-attached cash prize, donated by Forum observers, determined by Forum observer ballot.

== Hot Docs Ted Rogers Cinema ==
Hot Docs owns and operates Hot Docs Ted Rogers Cinema, a century-old theatre located in The Annex neighbourhood of Toronto.

In 2011, the cinema was purchased by Toronto-based Blue Ice Group, a film financing and production company, and its partner, Hot Docs Canadian International Documentary Festival. After renovations, the cinema reopened in March 2012 under the management of Hot Docs as the Bloor Hot Docs Cinema, becoming a year-round home for first-run Canadian and international documentaries, as well as special documentary presentations and showcases, including the popular Doc Soup screening series.

In June 2016, a donation from the Rogers Family enabled Hot Docs to purchase the cinema from the Blue Ice Group.

== Year-Round Programs ==
In addition to Hot Docs Ted Rogers Cinema, Hot Docs runs several year-round programs in Toronto and across Canada.

=== Doc Soup ===
In 2001, Hot Docs introduced the Doc Soup monthly screening series running October through April at Hot Docs Ted Rogers Cinema. Doc Soup series launched in Vancouver and Calgary in 2008, and Edmonton in 2009. Doc Soup Calgary continues in partnership with Calgary International Film Festival, while the Vancouver and Edmonton series have since evolved into a Hot Docs Showcase events. In 2016, a Doc Soup Sundays series was introduced at Hot Docs Cinema, with a focus on documentaries about art, culture and design.

Notable past Doc Soup titles include Oscar-winner Louie Psihoyos's Racing Extinction, Kirby Dick's The Hunting Ground, Joe Berlinger's Under African Skies, R.J. Cutler's The September Issue, Yung Chang's award-winning Up the Yangtze, Heidi Ewing and Rachel Grady's Oscar-nominated Jesus Camp and Heddy Honigmann's Crazy.

=== Hot Docs Showcase ===
The Showcase program brings documentaries to communities across Ontario and Canada.

Past Ontario-based showcase screenings have occurred at the Art Gallery of Hamilton BMO Financial Group World Film Festival, Belleville Downtown DocFest, Cinéfest Sudbury International Film Festival, Guelph Film Festival, Junction North International Documentary Festival in Sudbury, Museum London, Sault Community Theatre Centre in Sault Ste. Marie, and the Windsor International Film Festival.

Cross-Canada screenings include annual showcase screenings in Vancouver at Vancity Theatre, Winnipeg at Gimme Some Truth and Edmonton at Northwestfest.

=== Hot Docs Collection ===
Hundreds of documentary titles, including past festival and Hot Docs Ted Rogers Cinema selections, production fund recipients and market program alumni, are offered on on-demand viewing platforms across North America. Platforms include iTunes, Hoopla, Kanopy, Sundance Now, Vimeo On Demand, Bell Fibe TV, Cineplex Store, CraveTV and Rogers On Demand.

== Production Funds ==
Hot Docs currently administers three production funds: the Hot Docs Ted Rogers Fund provides financial support to Canadian filmmakers; the Hot Docs-Blue Ice Group Documentary Fund provides financial support to documentary filmmakers based Africa; and the CrossCurrents Doc Fund aims to foster storytelling from historically underrepresented or marginalized communities. Hot Docs also administered the Corus-Hot Docs Funds (formerly Shaw Media-Hot Docs Funds).

=== CrossCurrents Doc Fund ===
The CrossCurrents Doc Fund is an international documentary production fund that fosters storytelling from within communities whose perspectives have been historically underrepresented or marginalized. In particular, it focuses on emerging filmmakers who have a connection to or shared experience with their subject, as well as sharing stories with audiences within and outside the featured community.

Initiated by the R&M Lang Foundation in 2013, the Fund promotes inclusion in the documentary space celebrating all doc forms and the diverse perspectives of storytellers. The short/interactive stream awards one $10,000 CAD grant and Hot Docs fellowship to participate in the Emerging Filmmakers Lab at Hot Docs.

In 2016, the Panicaro Foundation introduced the theatrical stream for feature doc projects granting up to $30,000 CAD, and Hot Docs fellowships, to one or more projects each year.

=== Hot Docs-Blue Ice Docs Fund ===
Established in 2011, the Hot Docs-Blue Ice Docs Fund helps enable more African documentary filmmakers to tell stories and contribute to a new generation of the African documentary community. In 2016, the Fund was renewed with an additional $1.25 million CAD, bringing the total investment to $2.35 million.

The Fund provides development grants of up to 10,000 CAD and production grants of up to $40,000 CAD to four to 10 projects annually. Each year, up to five funded projects are also invited to participate in a year-long mentorship program, along with private filmmaker labs at Hot Docs and the Durban FilmMart/Durban International Film Festival.

=== Hot Docs Ted Rogers Fund ===
In June 2016, Hot Docs and the Rogers Foundation founded the $1-million Hot Docs Ted Rogers Fund to support Canadian documentary filmmakers. Over 10 years, production grants will be distributed to Canadian documentary filmmakers. Up to $20,000 is granted to three or four projects each year.

=== Corus-Hot Docs Funds ===
Established in 2008, the $4-million Corus-Hot Docs Funds provided production grants and no-interest development loans to projects at critical stages. After successfully distributing its allocated funding over eight years to 147 documentaries, the Corus-Hot Docs Funds closed in 2016.

== See also ==
- Cinema of Canada
- Cinema of Quebec
- National Film Board
- Toronto International Film Festival
