= Requiem for the American Dream =

2017 book by Noam Chomsky

- Author: Noam Chomsky
- Publisher: Seven Stories Press
- Publication date: April 2017
- Media type: paperback
- Pages: 172
- ISBN: 978-1-60980-736-8

Requiem for the American Dream: The 10 Principles of Concentration of Wealth & Power is a book by political activist and linguist Noam Chomsky. It was created and edited by Peter Hutchison, Kelly Nyks, and Jared P. Scott. Based on over four years' worth of interviews between Chomsky and the editors (of the film by the same name), this is the first book under his name to be devoted to a single topic: income inequality. It lays out Chomsky's views and analysis of neoliberalism, and focuses on the rapid concentration of wealth and power in the United States beginning in the mid-to-late 20th century. The book was published by Seven Stories Press in 2017.

== Overview ==
Chomsky analyzes the way in which power relations shifted from the late 1940s to today, in the name of "plutocratic interests". This shift in power relations ends up being an assault "on lower- and middle-class people, which has escalated in recent decades during the ascendancy of what is known as 'neoliberalism' – with fiscal austerity for the poor and tax cuts and other subsidies for the wealthy minority."

He explores topics such as the rise of financialization, which "is a process whereby financial markets, financial institutions, and financial elites gain greater influence over economic policy and economic outcomes," the decline of labor unions, concentration of wealth, political corruption, deindustrialization, offshoring, and the power of multinational corporations. As a result of some of these factors, the world's top 1% now own more wealth than 95% of humanity.

=== Summary of the Ten Principles ===
Chomsky observes that concentration of wealth yields concentration of power, particularly so as the cost of elections skyrockets, which forces the political parties into the pockets of major corporations. This political power then quickly translates into legislation that increases the concentration of wealth. Hence, fiscal policy like tax policy, deregulation, rules of corporate governance and a whole variety of political measures increase the concentration of wealth and power which, in turn, yields more political power to the rich. The book is organized around 10 principles, each described below:

1. Reduce Democracy: James Madison, one of the founding fathers of the United States constitution, pointed out that with more democracy, the poor could join forces and take away the property of the rich; in his own words, "the major concern of society has to be to protect the minority of the opulent against the majority." Aristotle's Politics points out the same dilemma, but proposes a different solution: instead of 'reducing democracy', he suggests to reduce inequalities with what we nowadays call a welfare state. The United States has seen class conflicts between pressure for more freedom and democracy from lower classes. For instance, the 1960s were a period of significant democratization during which consciousness about minority rights, women's rights, the environment, and war shifted.
2. Shape Ideology: This period of democratization was followed by a backlash from multinational corporations and financial institutions in the 1970s. On the right side, the Powell Memorandum warned that business was losing control of society and that something had to be done to control these forces; on the liberal side, similar ideas arose. The first major report of the Trilateral Commission warns about 'the crisis of democracy', more precisely an 'excess of democracy'. In this report, liberals were particularly concerned with what was happening to young people — "the young people are getting too free and independent" — and that the schools and universities are responsible for the "indoctrination of the young". Interestingly, this report never mentions private business. This omission can be interpreted as private business being de facto the national interest.
3. Redesign the Economy: Chomsky argues that since the 1970s, there has been a concerted effort by the "masters of mankind" to shift the economy in two crucial ways: financialization and offshoring of production.
  1. Financialization: in his view, the declining rate of profit on industrial production coincided with astronomical increases in the flow of speculative capital, which moved the financial sector towards "risky investments, complex financial instruments, and money manipulations".
  2. Offshoring: multinational corporations like Apple, looking to exploit cheaper labor, shift production to countries like China or Vietnam that have little-to-no health and safety standards or environmental constraints. Chomsky also says that international free trade agreements put American workers, for example, in competition with exploited workers in China; and that many lost manufacturing jobs aren't returning back to the United States unless social policy changes, against the wishes of the wealthy elite.
4. Shift the Burden: A new category of wealth called the plutonomy are the main drivers of various economies. But concern for their own salaries and a select few sectors of society that sustain their privileges (like a powerful military and government bailouts) has taken precedence over the viability of the country. He also says reduced taxes for the wealthy have increased the tax burdens on the rest of the population.
5. Attack Solidarity: One reason why the elites hate systems like Social Security and public education is because they benefit the general public and not them. According to Chomsky, these systems are based on the principle of solidarity, which means caring for others. In order to privatize these systems, they must be defunded, attacked, and destroyed. The wealthy elite also seek to eliminate and diminish the government, except where it benefits their interests.
6. Run the Regulators: Industries often initiate or support regulations knowing that they will be able to control or influence the regulators over the long-term. In more extreme cases, such as in banking, they are practically able to write the laws. As members of the government transition to roles in industries that they were supposed to be regulating, Chomsky argues that regulatory capture is almost inevitable. He claims that lobbying sharply increased in response to the Nixon administration's implementation of agencies like the EPA and OSHA and that businesses pushed for more deregulation. That deregulation ultimately led to a multitude of financial crises that required government intervention.
7. Engineer Elections: Two court case rulings allowed corporations to buy elections with virtually no constraints: Buckley v. Valeo decided that money was a form of free speech and Citizens United allowed corporations to spend unlimited funds on campaign advertising. After corporate-funded candidates win, they get privileged access. Chomsky believes they can use lobbyists and lawyers to essentially write whatever policies they want.
8. Keep the Rabble in Line: The democratizing force of labor unions threatens those in power and becomes a target for attack by various interests. This practice is known as union busting. According to the U.S. Department of the Treasury, union membership peaked in the 1950s, and income inequality "was close to its lowest level since its peak before the Great Depression, and was continuing to fall." But since then, membership has experienced a steep decline, while income inequality has steadily increased.
9. Manufacture Consent: The public relations industry's entire purpose is the 'engineering of consent' for the public, so that they support the policies and decisions of the intelligent minority (a concept he attributes to Edward Bernays). One way you go about this is controlling people's attitudes and beliefs through consumerism, debt, and advertising. The goal is to create uninformed consumers making irrational choices. These same methods are used to undermine elections and sell political candidates. Chomsky uses Barack Obama as an example. Obama won several awards from the advertising industry after winning the 2008 United States presidential election.
10. Marginalize the Population: Chomsky references a 2014 study by Martin Gilens and Benjamin Page that shows a disconnect between popular support of policies and government action. They discuss some of their findings:
  In the United States, our findings indicate, the majority does not rule—at least not in the causal sense of actually determining policy outcomes. When a majority of citizens disagrees with economic elites or with organized interests, they generally lose. Moreover, because of the strong status quo bias built into the U.S. political system, even when fairly large majorities of Americans favor policy change, they generally do not get it.
  Chomsky ends by saying that Americans need to find new ways of political action and that many of the serious flaws in American society, its culture, and institutions will have to be addressed outside of commonly accepted frameworks. He advocates for more organizing, fighting against corporate interests, and dismantling illegitimate authority.

== Reception ==
Reception to the book has been generally positive, with Publishers Weekly saying "Chomsky and his collaborators have created a perceptive and revelatory examination of the forces driving America inequality."

HuffPost also praised the book, saying "While many books attempt to explain how we got to this political moment (some successfully), Noam Chomsky's latest, Requiem for the American Dream, provides necessary historical context. Zooming in on ten ways that government and corporate interests have kept the American people down, Chomsky offers a compelling history that explains today's economic and political landscape."

== Film ==
A documentary film with the same name, Requiem for the American Dream, was released in 2015. It featured Noam Chomsky and was directed by Peter D. Hutchison, Kelly Nyks, and Jared P. Scott.

== See also ==
- Corruption
- Labor unions
- Labor rights
- Corporate crime
- Wealth inequality
- The Wealth of Nations
