= Murder of Robert Eric Wone =

Unsolved 2006 murder in the United States

Robert Eric Wone
- Born: June 1, 1974; New York, New York, U.S.
- Died: August 2, 2006 (aged 32); Washington, D.C., U.S.
- Cause of death: Stabbing
- Employer: Radio Free Asia

Robert Eric Wone (June 1, 1974 – August 3, 2006) was an American lawyer who was murdered in the Washington, D.C. home of a college friend, Joseph Price, in August 2006. Wone was living in suburban Oakton, Virginia, but had been working as general counsel at Radio Free Asia in downtown Washington. He had stayed the night at the home of friends located about one mile from his office. According to police affidavits, Wone was believed to have been "restrained, incapacitated, and sexually assaulted" before his death. The residents of the home – Price, Victor Zaborsky and Dylan Ward – contended that the murder was committed by an intruder unknown to them; the trial judge found this unbelievable. Wone's official cause of death was attributed to knife wounds.

Within days of the murder, the Metropolitan Police Department (MPDC) alleged that the crime scene had been tampered with, but no charges were filed for over two years. In late 2008, police charged Price, Zaborsky and Ward with obstruction of justice and conspiracy related to alleged tampering with the crime scene. The men were acquitted of the charges in June 2010. No one else has been charged with Wone's killing. In November 2008 his widow, Katherine Wone, filed a wrongful death lawsuit against Price, Zaborsky and Ward; the suit was settled on August 3, 2011, for an undisclosed sum and agreement.

== Victim ==
Robert Eric Wone was 32 years old at the time of his death. He was a fourth-generation Chinese American, born in Manhattan and raised in Brooklyn, New York.

After graduating from Xaverian High School as valedictorian of his class, Wone attended the College of William & Mary as a James Monroe Scholar. There, he met Joseph Price, then a senior, in the 1992–93 academic year. Wone and Price shared several activities, including an honor society and student government leadership positions, before Price graduated in 1993. In September 1993, the Richmond Times-Dispatch published an opinion piece co-written by Wone, criticizing a prior Times-Dispatch article on William & Mary faculty. Wone graduated from William & Mary in 1996, and then received his Juris Doctor degree with honors from the University of Pennsylvania Law School in 1999. He subsequently served as law clerk to Judge Raymond A. Jackson of the Federal District Court for the Eastern District of Virginia. Wone later worked in commercial real estate law for six years as an attorney with the Washington, D.C., law firm of Covington & Burling. As part of his public service responsibilities with the firm, he served as general counsel for the Organization of Chinese Americans (OCA).

On June 7, 2003, Wone married Katherine Ellen Yu, and the couple lived in Fairfax County, Virginia. On June 30, 2006, about two months before he was killed, Wone left Covington & Burling and was hired as general counsel for Radio Free Asia. Wone was very active within the Asian American community, supporting organizations such as OCA and the Museum of Chinese in America. At the time of his death, he was president-elect of the Asian Pacific American Bar Association.

== Crime ==
On August 2, 2006, Wone was fatally stabbed while staying overnight at a rowhouse on Swann Street in Washington's Dupont Circle neighborhood, owned by Price and his domestic partner Victor Zaborsky, where they lived with Dylan Ward as a polyamorous family unit. Wone had gone to Price's residence at approximately 10:30pm after working late, as had been arranged days before.

Neighbors reported hearing a scream, later identified as Zaborsky's, during the 11:00pm newscast (i.e., before 11:35 PM). Zaborsky made a 9-1-1 call at 11:49 PM and paramedics arrived five minutes later, followed by the officers of the Metropolitan Police Department (MPDC). Price phoned Wone's wife, and Wone was pronounced dead at George Washington University Hospital at 12:24 AM on August 3.

Price, Zaborsky and Ward all initially spoke with the police without attorneys, and video recordings of those interviews were shown at the subsequent conspiracy trial. The three men denied any involvement in Wone's death and speculated that an intruder had killed him. The three also denied any sexual relationship with Wone, and Wone's family have described him as both "straight and happily married". All three men attended Wone's funeral, where Price served as a pallbearer. Future U.S. Attorney General Eric Holder, who at that time worked at Wone's former employer Covington & Burling, called Wone "a kind and gentle man" who was "killed in the most horrible of ways".

== Investigation ==
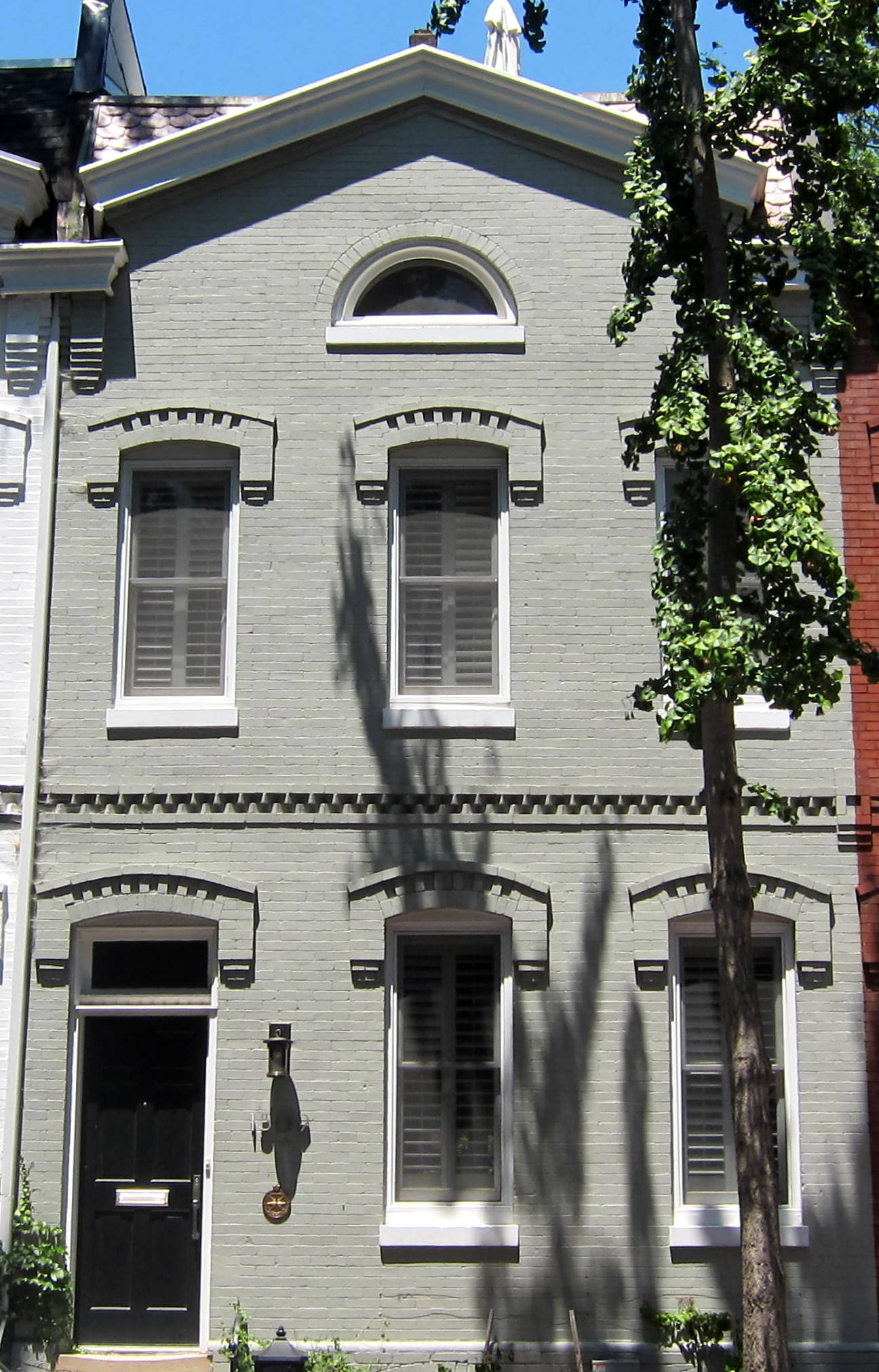
The house where Wone was murdered at 1509 Swann St NW

Paramedics responding to the emergency call "found the three residents’ calm behavior unusual; none were screaming or even helping direct the paramedics". According to Ward's attorney, detectives who interrogated the three housemates on the night of the killing informed them that they were the main suspects in the case, and asked many sexually charged, accusatory questions. Three days after the killing, the Gay and Lesbian Liaison Unit of the MPDC were called in, but unit head Sgt. Brett Parson declined to discuss the unit's involvement. Within two weeks of the murder, police publicly alleged that the crime scene had been tampered with. Investigators spent more than three weeks examining the Swann Street rowhouse in detail, "removing flooring, pieces of walls, a chunk of staircase, the washing machine, even sink traps". Allegations that the area around Wone's body had been cleaned were revealed in an affidavit in support of a search warrant for Price's offices at the D.C. law firm of Arent Fox.

=== Burglary ===
Three months after Wone's death, Price's brother Michael and an accomplice named Phelps Collins burgled the Swann Street rowhouse; they took more than $7,000 of electronic equipment. Two individuals, including Price's brother, were charged with the burglary, but those charges were later dropped. In 2007, the MPDC revealed that they had been preparing to make an arrest in the Wone murder case in 2006, but that the burglary had derailed those plans. Police have not revealed the name of the arrest target, nor the charge(s) that would have been filed.

=== Lack of progress ===
In August 2007, The Washington Post reported the frustration of Wone's widow with the FBI crime lab: "It has been trying at times as we continue to wait for the FBI to complete their analysis of all the samples that were taken." Over one year, the case had been transferred to three separate prosecutors, earning it "vagabond status" in the U.S. Attorneys' office. Wone's widow retained the services of attorney Holder to peruse the case. On the first anniversary of Wone's death, she held a press conference to appeal for public assistance in finding the killer, her first public comment on the case. During the press conference, Holder publicly pleaded with Price, Zaborsky and Ward to provide additional information, saying, "You need to ask yourself, 'Have I provided police with all the information I know?'" Interested parties, such as the OCA, used the first anniversary of Wone's death to criticize what they deemed police inaction in the investigation. In contrast to the first anniversary of Wone's murder, there was no press conference on the second anniversary, and neither the Wone family nor police made any statements to the press.

=== Arrests and charges ===
In October 2008, an obstruction of justice charge was filed against Ward, who had since moved to Miami-Dade County, Florida, and was living in a home owned by Price. In November 2008, Price and Zaborsky were arrested and also charged with obstruction of justice. All three men were later released pending trial, but subject to electronic monitoring and curfews. On December 19, 2008, additional charges of conspiracy were filed against all three men. During the same hearing, the electronic monitoring and curfew restrictions for the three defendants were ended and prosecutors announced the possibility that charges related to tampering with evidence could be filed in the future.

The affidavit filed by authorities supporting the arrest warrant for Ward showed that investigators had concluded the men were not telling the truth about what happened. The report states, "The evidence demonstrates that Robert Wone was restrained, incapacitated, sexually assaulted, and murdered inside 1509 Swann Street", and there exists "overwhelming evidence, far in excess of probable cause" that Price, Zaborsky and Ward had "obstructed justice by altering and orchestrating the crime scene, planting evidence, delaying the reporting of the murder to the authorities, and lying to the police about the true circumstances of the murder". Lawyers for the three accused men have called the affidavit "speculation, innuendo, assumptions, and irrelevant inflammatory comments" and maintain their clients' innocence. Price and Zaborsky were domestic partners, and the affidavit alleges that Price had previously had a sexual relationship with Ward. Washington attorney Dale Sanders opined that the release of the extensively detailed affidavit was intended to turn one of the housemates, presumably Ward, against the others, and hypothesized that it indicated prosecutors lacked sufficient evidence to charge any of the housemates with additional crimes without the cooperation of a witness.

Officials believe that a knife from the kitchen had been smeared with blood and placed near the body, while a duplicate of the knife that was missing from a set found in Ward's bedroom would have been more consistent with the wounds to Wone's body. The autopsy revealed evidence of some degree of suffocation, perhaps by a pillow, and puncture marks on his neck, chest, foot and hand. Though no toxins were found in his blood, a lack of evidence of struggle led investigators to suspect Wone had been injected with a paralytic agent. Cadaver dogs hit on a dryer lint trap and the patio drain, which detectives believe may be evidence that someone washed themselves in the back patio area, and dried wet clothes in the dryer. Washington City Paper columnist Jason Cherkis reported unattributed criticism of the medical examiner's failure to test for exotic drugs and to keep a sample of Wone's blood for later testing, as well as detectives' failure to follow up on a lint trap that had attracted a cadaver dog's attention.

Price's lawyer challenged the timing of the indictments, saying that a contemporaneous civil suit brought by Wone's family "looked unseemly" and questioned whether the prosecutors and Wone family attorneys were acting in concert.

In April 2009, prosecutors disclosed that two emails had been drafted on Wone's BlackBerry "at a time when prosecutors believed Wone dead.” An independent criminal law attorney noted, "The defense will argue that this is consistent with their claim that the murder happened quickly by an intruder and it was not a long, drawn-out effort to sexually assault Wone before he was killed, as the government is alleging." Previously, a court filing indicated that the government intended to release a personal profile that Price allegedly used on ALT.com, "a sexually oriented web site specializing in S&M practices.”

Formal defense in the conspiracy case began on June 17, 2010, and concluded without any of the defendants testifying. On June 29, Judge Lynn Leibovitz found each of the three men not guilty of charges of conspiracy, obstruction of justice and tampering with evidence. Leibovitz, in explaining her ruling for almost an hour from the bench, stated that she personally believed that the men knew who killed Wone, but was not convinced beyond a reasonable doubt that they committed the offenses with which they were charged.

=== Civil lawsuit ===
On November 25, 2008, Wone's widow filed a wrongful death lawsuit against Price, Zaborsky and Ward, largely based on the police affidavit. The lawsuit alleged "defendants' negligent failure to rescue Robert Wone after he was injured, defendants' destruction of evidence of Robert Wone's murder, and defendants' conspiracy to destroy evidence and obstruct the police investigation into Robert Wone's murder". The suit was settled August 3, 2011, for an undisclosed sum and agreement. Prior to his nomination as Attorney General, Holder advised Wone's widow on a pro bono basis.

== Aftermath ==
Wone's death has proven to be one of the most mysterious homicide cases in Washington history. The Washington Examiner listed the Wone case, in light of the arrests, as one of eight top crime stories in D.C. for 2008. The Washington Blade stated that the case "has captured the interest of the gay community because it occurred inside the home of a prominent gay male couple". A story aired by local station WTTG in March 2009 highlighted a website cataloging the investigative efforts of "four amateur sleuths who live in the neighborhood".

Since Wone's death, multiple organizations have established scholarships and other memorials in his name, including the Virginia Department of Social Services "Robert E. Wone Award for Exemplary Service;" the annual "Robert E. Wone Judicial Clerkship & Internship Conference," which rotates among the D.C. area law schools, including the Georgetown University Law Center, the American University Washington College of Law, and the Howard University School of Law; a workroom at OCA headquarters; the "Robert E. Wone Fellowship" of the Asian Pacific American Bar Association Educational Fund; the "Robert E. Wone Scholarship" of OCA's New Jersey Chapter; the "Robert E. Wone Memorial Trust," administered by the Greater Washington Community Foundation; and the "Robert E. Wone Clinical Fellowship" at the University of Pennsylvania Law School, including a room in the law school's Civil Practice Clinic. On October 22, 2011, family and friends gathered at Barksdale Field at the College of William & Mary to dedicate two benches and two Chinese pistache trees in Wone's memory. The plaques on the benches read "Rest awhile and enjoy the wonderful world around you," a reference to one of Wone's favorite songs by Louis Armstrong, "What a Wonderful World." In April 2023, the Robert E. Wone Scholarship Endowment was established at the College of William & Mary.

A 2016 Blade article by Lou Chibbaro Jr. revealed that, according to public records, Joseph Price and Dylan Ward had changed their names to Joseph Anderson and Dylan Thomas, respectively. The article states that Price had worked for Americans for Immigrant Justice, a Miami-based immigrant advocacy group, since 2013, while Ward had become a massage practitioner and pilates instructor. Ward (under his new name) has been featured on the website of the "Pure Pilates" studio in Fort Lauderdale as recently as 2023. Zaborsky did not change his name and continued to work for the Milk Processor Education Program (MilkPEP), a D.C.-based dairy and milk industry trade association where he had worked since 1995. He is known to have worked for the organization as recently as 2020. Property records at the time showed that Price and Zaborsky owned a house in Miami Shores, a suburb of Miami.

In 2023, Jared P. Scott directed a documentary for Peacock called Who Killed Robert Wone?, further investigating the case. At the end of the documentary, it was confirmed that Price and Zaborsky were still living together in Florida, while Ward had gotten married.

== See also ==
- List of unsolved murders (2000–present)
