= Earth (2023 TV series) =

- Directed by: Tom Hewitson; Ben Wilson; James Tovell; Duncan Singh; David Briggs
- Presented by: Chris Packham
- Composer: Paul Saunderson
- Country of origin: United Kingdom
- Original language: English
- No. of series: 1
- No. of episodes: 5

Production
- Executive producers: Andrew Cohen; Rob Liddell
- Production company: BBC Studios

Original release
- Network: BBC Two
- Release: 17 July 2023

Earth is a 2023 miniseries presented by Chris Packham, produced by BBC Studios with NOVA and GBH Boston for the BBC and PBS, in partnership with the Open University. It consists of five one-hour episodes. Although a nature documentary, a significant part of the series is made with CGI featuring Chris Packham narrating with voiceovers. More than 200 leading palaeontologists, geologists, climatologists, and other specialists were consulted for the series. In the United States, the series was re-edited and released as five successive episodes, under the name Ancient Earth on a PBS science program, NOVA.

It first aired on BBC Two on 17 July 2023.

== Episodes ==
No.	Title
1	"Inferno"
Flood basalts in the Siberian Traps cause the greatest mass extinction in the fossil record - the Permian–Triassic extinction event.
2	"Snowball"
720 million years ago, the break-up of the supercontinent Rodinia caused a Snowball Earth
3	"Green"
Plate tectonics was started by the Late Heavy Bombardment. Plate tectonics started the carbon cycle and other biogeochemical cycles. Plants and fungi invaded the land causing oxygen levels to rise and carbon dioxide levels to fall. Another Snowball Earth almost occurred, but the formation of Pangaea stabilised temperatures.
4	"Atmosphere"
Shortly after the Earth's formation, volcanic eruptions release toxic gases into the sky, creating the atmosphere. Water vapor condenses into the first oceans, the only place hospitable to the earliest life forms. The evolution of photosynthesis pumps oxygen into the sky, leading to the Great Oxidation Event which tints the planet red with iron oxide and unlocks the biological potential of thousands of new minerals.
5	"Human"
66 million years ago, the Cretaceous-Paleogene extinction event wipes out the non-avian dinosaurs and enables an explosion of mammal diversity. Primates thrived in a global jungle in the wake of the Paleocene-Eocene thermal maximum. In the later Cenozoic, humans evolve as the climate cools, and eventually populate the globe. The invention of farming opened the door to profound anthropogenic impacts.

== Reception ==
The Guardian gave the show four stars. The Daily Telegraph was less happy with the "doom laden" message presented in the show and gave it 3 stars. The Irish Independent was also less than impressed, describing Packham's delivery as "self-righteous" and "annoying" to the extent it undermines the serious message of the show. The Financial Times was more positive, praising the visuals and giving it 4 stars.

=== Accolades ===
In 2024, the NOVA version (Ancient Earth) was nominated for a News and Documentary Emmy Award in the category of Outstanding Graphic Design: Documentary.

== Book ==
Packham published a book with Andrew Cohen titled Earth: Over 4 Billion Years in the Making, which ties in with the show.
