= Jenny Packham =

British fashion designer

- Education: Saint Martin's School of Art
- Occupation: Fashion designer
- Label: Jenny Packham
- Relatives: Chris Packham (brother)
- Website: jennypackham.com

Jenny Packham is a British fashion designer. She mostly makes ready-to-wear clothes and wedding dresses. She is the sister of naturalist and television presenter Chris Packham.

== Career ==
Packham studied at Southampton College of Art, and then at Saint Martin's School of Art in London.

Her designs were first presented in 1988, at the London Designer Show. In 2013 a retrospective selection of her work was shown in the Raphael Gallery of the V&A Museum, in celebration of twenty-five years of her label.

Packham has designed at least eight dresses for the Princess of Wales, including the one she wore to the Olympic Gala Concert at the Albert Hall in 2012, and the gold gown she wore to the premiere of the James Bond film No Time to Die in 2021. She has also designed clothes for Jennifer Aniston, Miley Cyrus and Keira Knightley, among others.

Packham's designs have been used in the James Bond films Die Another Day and Casino Royale – and in television; she designed costumes for Kim Cattrall in Sex and the City, and for various episodes of Gossip Girl.

== Recognition ==
Packham received an honorary doctorate from Southampton Solent University in 2008.
