= Chris Packham =

English naturalist (born 1961)

Chris Packham CBE
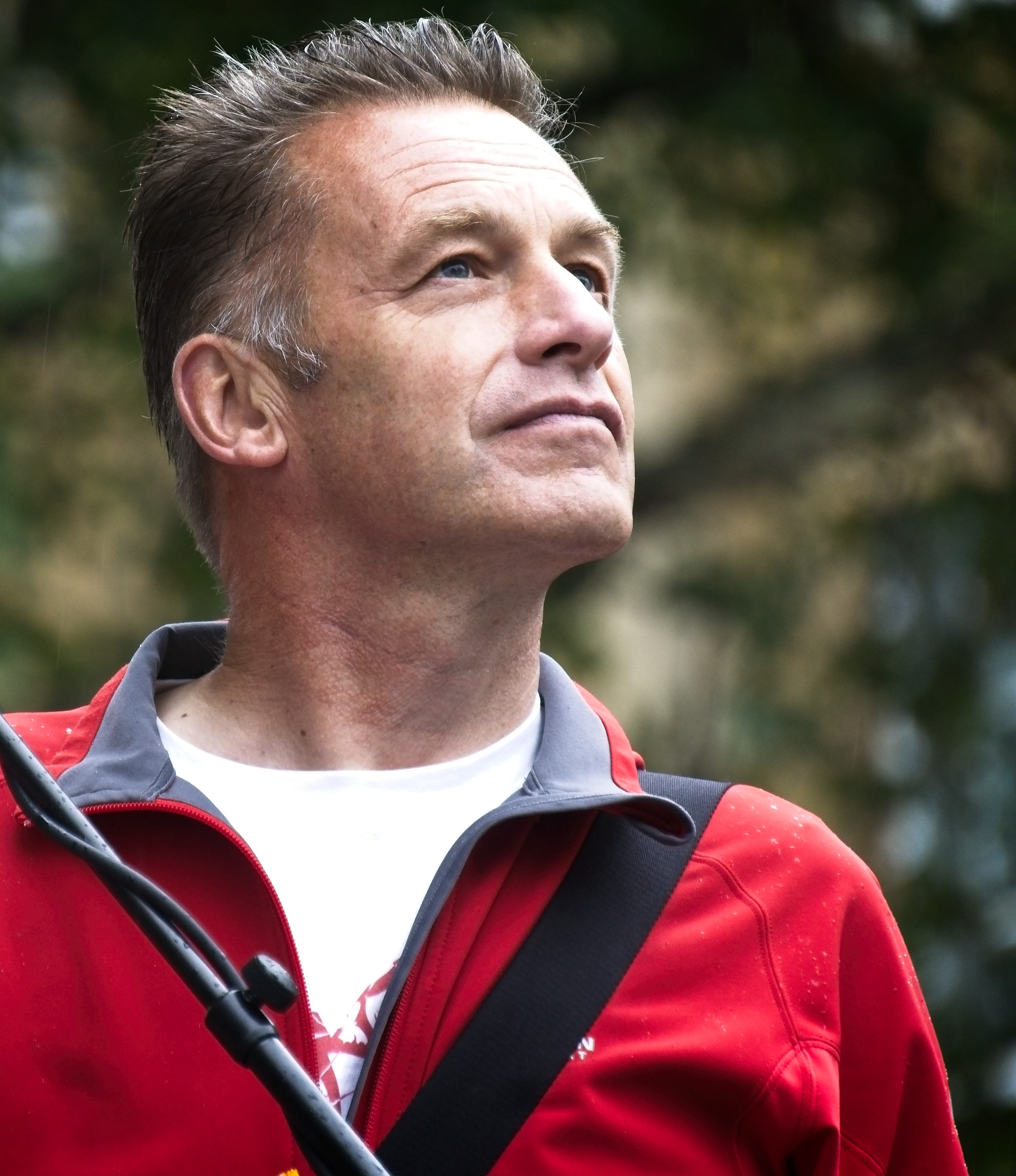
- Packham following the People's Walk for Wildlife at Richmond Terrace, Whitehall in London, September 2018
- Born: Christopher Gary Packham; 4 May 1961 (age 65); Southampton, Hampshire, England
- Education: University of Southampton
- Occupations: Nature photographer; television presenter; author; campaigner
- Years active: 1986–present
- Spouse: Jo McCubbin (div. 2008)
- Family: Jenny Packham (sister); Megan McCubbin (step-daughter)
- Awards: Dilys Breese Medal
- Chris Packham's voice from the BBC programme Desert Island Discs, 13 October 2013.
- Website: chrispackham.co.uk

Christopher Gary Packham (born 4 May 1961) is an English naturalist, television presenter and author. He best known for his television work including the CBBC children's nature series The Really Wild Show and the BBC nature series Springwatch, including Autumnwatch and Winterwatch, since 2009.

== Early life ==
Packham was born in Southampton, Hampshire, on 4 May 1961. He went to Bitterne Park Secondary School and Taunton's College. In 1979, he enrolled in Biological Sciences at the University of Southampton, where he took a BSc degree in zoology. He enrolled in, then withdrew from a PhD degree to train as a wildlife cameraman.

== Television career ==
=== Early career ===
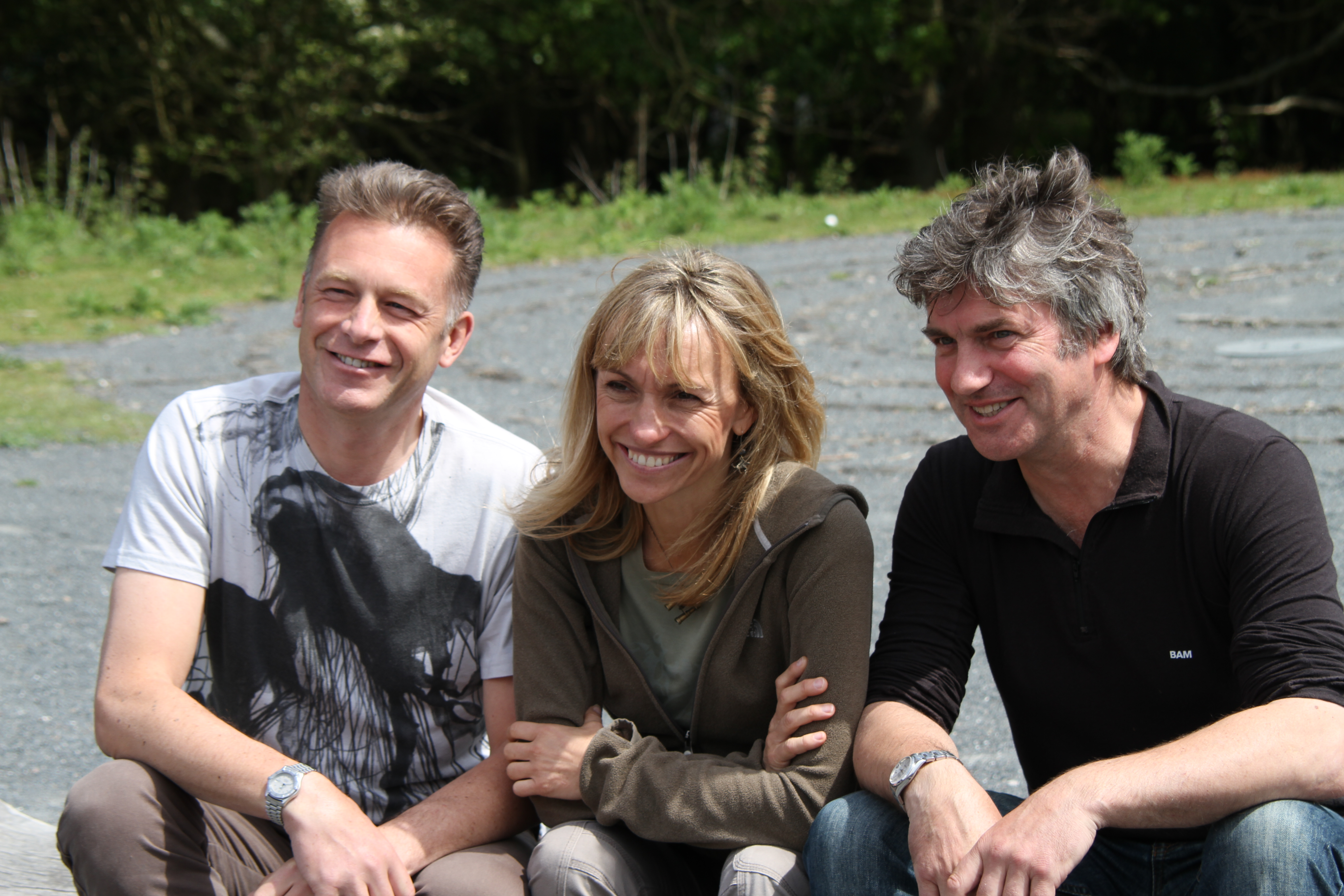
Packham with other Springwatch presenters Michaela Strachan and Martin Hughes-Games, in May 2014

In 1983, Packham was a part-time camera assistant for wildlife filmmaker Stephen Bolwell, working with him on A Toad's Tale.

From 1983 to 1985, he worked on The Living Planet series and The Living Isles for the BBC and Ourselves and Other Animals, a series for Channel 4.

Packham is known for his work as a television presenter, which began in 1986 with the BAFTA-winning BBC1 children's programme The Really Wild Show (1986–1995) and nature photography series Wild Shots on Channel 4. He also wrote and presented the BBC One series The X Creatures and BBC Two's Hands on Nature and Nature's Calendar. Other television series included Go Wild (Live) and Travel UK for Central Television, Nature's Detectives (BBC), Really Wild Guide (BBC2) and The Great Dinosaur Trail, which he wrote and presented for LTV Carlton Television, Watchout Series II and III as lead presenter, Animal Zone (BBC2), Postcards from the Wild and An Evening with Chris Packham for Discovery Animal Planet. Other network television programmes included Flying Gourmets Guide (BBC1), The Great British Birdwatch (Live) for BBC, Smokescreen for Harlech Television, Beachwatch (Live), Flamingo Watch (Live), Heading South (Live) for the BBC, and Behind the Scenes of the Lost World for Meridian Television.

During this time, Packham was involved in numerous regional television series, such as The London Wildlife Challenge for ITV Carlton Television, Anything Goes (Live), Birdwatch with Chris Packham, The Pier on Film and Wildwatch with Chris Packham for Meridian Television, and Go for Green for BSB Satellite and Cable. Regional television programmes included: Through Two Cameras, The Wild Garden, The Wood Worker, The Disappearing Down, Jewels in the Sand, Wildfowl Seasons and The Keepers of the Forest.

He was the lead presenter on BBC South's Inside Out, and has also worked on BBC South East's Inside Out with Kaddy Lee-Preston.

=== Since 2009 ===
Since June 2009, he has co-presented the BBC Two nature programme Springwatch – and its sister programmes BBC Autumnwatch and BBC Winterwatch – along with various others. He has also led yearly birdwatching tours in The Gambia.

Packham formed the production company Head Over Heels with producer Stuart Woodman, making wildlife programmes for Discovery Channel, National Geographic, and the BBC.

In 2011, Packham won an episode of the BBC's Celebrity Mastermind. His specialist subject was the Battle of Rorke's Drift. He also presented the BBC programme The Animal's Guide to Britain. In 2013, he presented a four-part documentary series entitled Secrets of Our Living Planet, which demonstrated the complex ecological relationships upon which apparently unconnected species, such as tigers and crabs, depend. In 2014, Packham presented a two-part BBC documentary in which he, Martha Kearney and Adam Hart examined in detail the behaviour of the honeybee, as well as a BBC series on animal cognition, called Inside the Animal Mind, which partly featured his own pet dogs. In 2014, he presented a 10-part series The Wonder of Animals for the BBC. It included episodes on birds of prey, dolphins, crocodiles, great apes, elephants, foxes, ants, big cats, bears and penguins.

In 2016, Packham co-presented a two-part series for the BBC, Cats v. Dogs: Which Is Best?, along with Liz Bonnin. The programmes compared cat behaviour and relationships with humans, against those of dogs, in the format of a mock contest. It also explored some recent research on the subject. In 2017, Packham co-presented Earth Live on Nat Geo Wild with Jane Lynch and Phil Keogan. The programme was a live journey exploring some of the most spectacular wildlife on the planet. He also worked with Jaguar Land Rover on a promotional podcast series called The Discovery Adventures.

In October 2017, he presented a BBC Television documentary about his experience as a high-functioning person with Asperger's, Chris Packham: Asperger's and Me. In the programme, Packham examined critically the approach taken to autism and Asperger syndrome in the United States.

In 2018 he presented BBC Two's The Real T-Rex, in which he attempted to rebuild the most authentic Tyrannosaurus rex ever seen, from the bones up. Also in January he presented Chris Packham: In Search of the Lost Girl on BBC Two, in which he highlighted the impact of palm oil consumption on the rainforests of Sumatra. In August 2018, Packham co-hosted Yellowstone Live on National Geographic Channel with TV host Josh Elliott, a four-night event showcasing the Greater Yellowstone Ecosystem with feeds from dozens of live cameras and seven camera crews.

In 2019, Packham presented, along with Liz Bonnin and Steve Backshall, four-part series Blue Planet Live. In 2020, he narrated a three-part documentary series called Primates. Along with Ella Al-Shamahi, he also co-presented Waterhole: Africa's Animal Oasis, which premiered in December of the same year. In 2021, Packham presented a six-part BBC Two documentary series called Animal Einsteins; the series premiered on 21 February 2021. In July 2021, a one-hour special titled Chris Packham: A Walk That Made Me, in which Packham walked a familiar path in Hampshire, premiered on BBC Two. Shortly after, he co-presented a six-part series alongside stepdaughter Megan McCubbin titled Chris and Meg's Wild Summer. In 2022, he presented a segment filmed in Iceland for the first episode of BBC's Our Changing Planet. In August 2022, Packham co-presented with Megan McCubbin BBC's Earth Proms concerts at the Royal Albert Hall. Packham narrated the three-part BBC nature series Dogs in the Wild: Meet the Family, that aired from late 2022 to early 2023.

In 2023, Packham presented Inside Our Autistic Minds, a two-part BBC documentary about autism. In June 2023, Channel 4 commissioned Chris Packham: is It Time to Break the Law?; a documentary in which Packham examined whether climate change protestors are justified in breaking the law for their cause. The documentary, released in September 2023, saw Packham accompany two Just Stop Oil protestors and film them daubing the headquarters of Policy Exchange with paint. Packham ultimately declared that he supported climate activists who were willing to commit imprisonable offences but did not intend to do so himself.

In June 2023, Packham joined the cast of the fifth series of Celebrity Gogglebox, alongside his daughter Megan McCubbin, and returned for the sixth series in 2024.

Packham presented Earth (2023), a five-part documentary series that aired on BBC Two. Packham presented Evolution (2026), a five-part documentary series commissioned by the BBC.

In October 2026, the BBC announced that Packham will co-present the upcoming wildlife series Naturewatch with his step-daughter Megan McCubbin and Kyle Thomas.

== Charity work and wildlife conservation ==
Packham is president of the Hawk Conservancy Trust, the Bat Conservation Trust, the Hampshire Ornithological Society, the British Trust for Ornithology, and the Southampton Natural History Society. He was president of the Hawk and Owl Trust between 2010 and 2015. Packham was president of the RSPCA from 2023 to 2024. In December 2024 Packham and Caroline Lucas resigned from the RSPCA after accusing it of "legitimising cruelty". He is vice-president of the RSPB, the Wildlife Trusts, Butterfly Conservation, the Brent Lodge Bird & Wildlife Trust, The Wildfowl and Wetlands Trust and Grace Secondary School (Sudan).

Packham is patron of Population Matters (formerly the Optimum Population Trust); Africat; the Sholing Valleys Study Centre; the Woolston Eyes Conservation Group, which manages Woolston Eyes Bird Reserve; the Humane Research Trust; the Fox Project; ORCA, the Seahorse Trust; the NatureWatch Foundation; Raptor Rescue; the Fleet Pond Society; and Birding for All.

Packham became the Ambassador for the National Autistic Society in October 2017.

Packham co-founded Wild Justice with Mark Avery and Ruth Tingay in February 2019, a not for profit company limited by guarantee which aims to ensure that the legal system in the UK protects wildlife.

In 2024, Packham became the first non-US-based director of the Climate Emergency Fund. In April 2025, he was announced as an ambassador for The Big Issue.

== Honours and awards ==
In 2011 he was awarded the Dilys Breese Medal, by the British Trust for Ornithology, for his "outstanding work in promoting science to new audiences".

In 2013, Packham was made an honorary Doctor of Science by the University of Southampton, having originally graduated from the university more than 30 years earlier.

In 2014, Packham was voted "Conservation Hero of the Year" by readers of Birdwatch magazine in association with the online BirdGuides website for his work in publicising the illegal slaughter in Malta of millions of migrating birds. He received a Wildscreen Panda Award for Outstanding Achievement (2016).

Packham's memoir Fingers in the Sparkle Jar, published by Ebury Press in 2017, was voted the UK's Favourite Nature Book in a poll run by the Arts and Humanities Research Council.

The BBC Two documentary Chris Packham: Asperger's and Me broadcast in 2017 received the 2018 Broadcasting Press Guild Award for the best single documentary.

In July 2018 he received an honorary doctorate from Royal Holloway, University of London, for his outstanding services to wildlife conservation.

Packham was appointed a Commander of the Order of the British Empire (CBE) in the 2019 New Year Honours for services to nature conservation.

== Views ==
In 2009, during an interview with the Radio Times, Packham suggested that the giant panda was too expensive to save and "should be allowed to become extinct" so that funds could be redistributed to protecting other animals and habitats. He made a comment, in September 2009, saying he would "eat the last panda" if doing so would retroactively redistribute the money spent on panda conservation.

In 2009, 2014, 2017 and 2021, he criticised the TV show I'm a Celebrity...Get Me Out of Here! for its mistreatment of animals.

In an interview with The Daily Telegraph in 2010, Packham said that "The human population is sowing the seeds of a mass extinction event" and advocated for humans reducing their population. In 2017, he again expressed this view saying that if every woman could be emancipated, birth rates would drop.

In 2014, he self-funded a film crew to produce a series to highlight the mass killing of migrating birds by hunters in Malta. In April 2017, he was arrested and charged with assault while filming on the Maltese island of Gozo. The case was dismissed after video footage evidence was revealed, with Packham saying "We had good evidence which showed that the boot was very firmly on the other foot – that we were the party that were abused in the situation. It serves to highlight what we came here to do, which was to throw attention on the fact that the Birds Directive – the legislation which is in place to protect birds all across Europe – is being abused here in Malta."

In 2015, Packham signed a letter to MPs to block the proposed changes to amend the Hunting Act 2004. He has worked to raise awareness of the illegal persecution of birds of prey in the UK. He resigned as President of the Hawk and Owl Trust in 2015 citing "Personal differences over ideas of policy". Later in 2015 Packham wrote an article in BBC Wildlife magazine complaining about the silence of many of Britain's leading conservation organisations on the issues of fox hunting, badger culling and hen harrier persecution. This elicited a public response from the Countryside Alliance calling for the BBC to sack him.

Packham organised the writing of a manifesto for UK wildlife in 2018 which he delivered to Downing Street via The Peoples Walk for Wildlife. The event raised awareness of the loss of wildlife in the UK with around 10,000 people turning up to march from Hyde Park to Downing Street.

Packham took part in Veganuary in 2019 and subsequently decided to remain a vegan, following three decades of vegetarianism. Later that year, Packham stated he would no-longer take internal flights and that he had purchased an electric car.

Packham opposes the currently under construction High Speed 2 project and launched legal action against it in March 2020, without success.

=== Harassment ===
Packham's activism in the cause of wildlife conservation has resulted in both online and offline harassment and physical threats against him, escalating in 2019, after he worked with Wild Justice in challenging the legality of general licences issued by Natural England for landowners to shoot a range of wild birds.

In October 2021, Packham's home was the object of a suspected arson attack which destroyed the gates to his property. Hampshire Constabulary stated that it was investigating the incident, but found no suspects, and laid no charges.

Packham commented that the attack was an escalation in the harassment he has received over some years, and that discovering dead animals, including foxes and badgers, tied to his gate was now a "normal occurrence". He said such "activity had escalated to the point where he now feared for his life and the safety of his family", but that it would not stop his activism, and publicising of the conservation causes he believed in.

Between April 2020 and November 2021, the website Country Squire Magazine published several articles, videos and tweets attacking Packham. He sued for defamation in the High Court, and in May 2023 Judge Pushpinder Saini ruled that all the allegations were false and defamatory, and awarded him damages of £90,000 plus costs.

== Personal life ==
Packham is the older brother of fashion designer Jenny Packham, and grew up in Hampshire with natural history as his main passion. He found his time at school very difficult, being socially excluded and regularly bullied by fellow pupils.

In his teenage years, he was responsible for the care of a kestrel, which he took from the wild and the death of which was a severe low point in his life. At university, he embraced the punk rock scene.

Packham has had Ménière's disease since his late 30s.

In 2003, at the age of 42, Packham began seeing a therapist after the death of his dog. As his work with the therapist concluded in 2005, Packham was diagnosed with Asperger syndrome. He has also stated that he has had severe depression.

Packham has owned a property in Bordeaux, France. In 2016 Packham lived in the New Forest with his pet poodles, Itchy and Scratchy. In 2019 he shared his New Forest home with two miniature poodles, Sid and Nancy, named after Sid Vicious, the bassist with the Sex Pistols, and Nancy Spungen, Sid's girlfriend.

For over ten years Packham has been in a relationship with Charlotte Corney, owner of the Wildheart Animal Sanctuary, although the couple live separately. He has a step-daughter, Megan McCubbin, a zoologist, who has appeared with him on Springwatch.

== Works ==
=== Books ===
- The Flying Gourmet's Guide (1985)
- Bird Brain of Britain (1988)
- Chris Packham's Wild Shots, Collins and Brown Publishers, (1993) ISBN 1-85585-200-4
- Chris Packham's Back Garden Nature Reserve New Holland Publishers (2001) (Foreword by David Bellamy) ISBN 1-85974-520-2
- Back Garden Nature Reserve (2003) ISBN 1-85605-846-8
- Chris Packham's Wild Side of Town: Getting to Know the Wildlife in Our Towns and Cities New Holland Publishers, (2003) ISBN 1-84330-355-8
- Nature's Calendar (2007) ISBN 0-00-724646-3
- Chris Packham's Nature Handbook (2010) ISBN 1-4053-5526-3
- The Wonder of Birds: nature, art, culture [Norfolk Museums Service] (2014) (Foreword by Chris Packham) ISBN 0-9031-0184-X
- Pets in Portraits by Robin Gibson (2015) (introduction by Chris Packham) ISBN 1855144980
- A Misuse of Nature by Sam Langers (2015) (introduction by Chris Packham)
- Fingers in the Sparkle Jar: A Memoir Ebury (2016) ISBN 978-1785033483
- Back to Nature: How to Love Life – and Save It Two Roads (2020) ISBN 978-1529350395
- Earth: Over 4 Billion Years in the Making William Collins (2023) ISBN 978-0008507206 (Co-author Andrew Cohen)
- Habitats: Discover Earth's Precious Wild Places DK (2023) ISBN 978-0241569498
- Chris Packham's Birdwatching Guide: From Beginner to Birder DK (2024) ISBN 978-0241634905

=== Papers ===
- Packham, Chris (March 1985). "Role of male Kestrel during incubation". British Birds. 78 (3): 144–5.
- Packham, Chris (April 1985). "Bigamy by the Kestrel". British Birds. 78 (4): 194–5.

=== Video ===
- Go Wild at Windsor Terry Nutkins and Chris Packham 1988.

=== Documentary film ===
- Aspergers And Me. Director: Charlie Russell. 2017.

=== YouTube Series ===
- 8 Out Of 10 Bats (2023)
