= Jared P. Scott =

American Documentary writer and producer

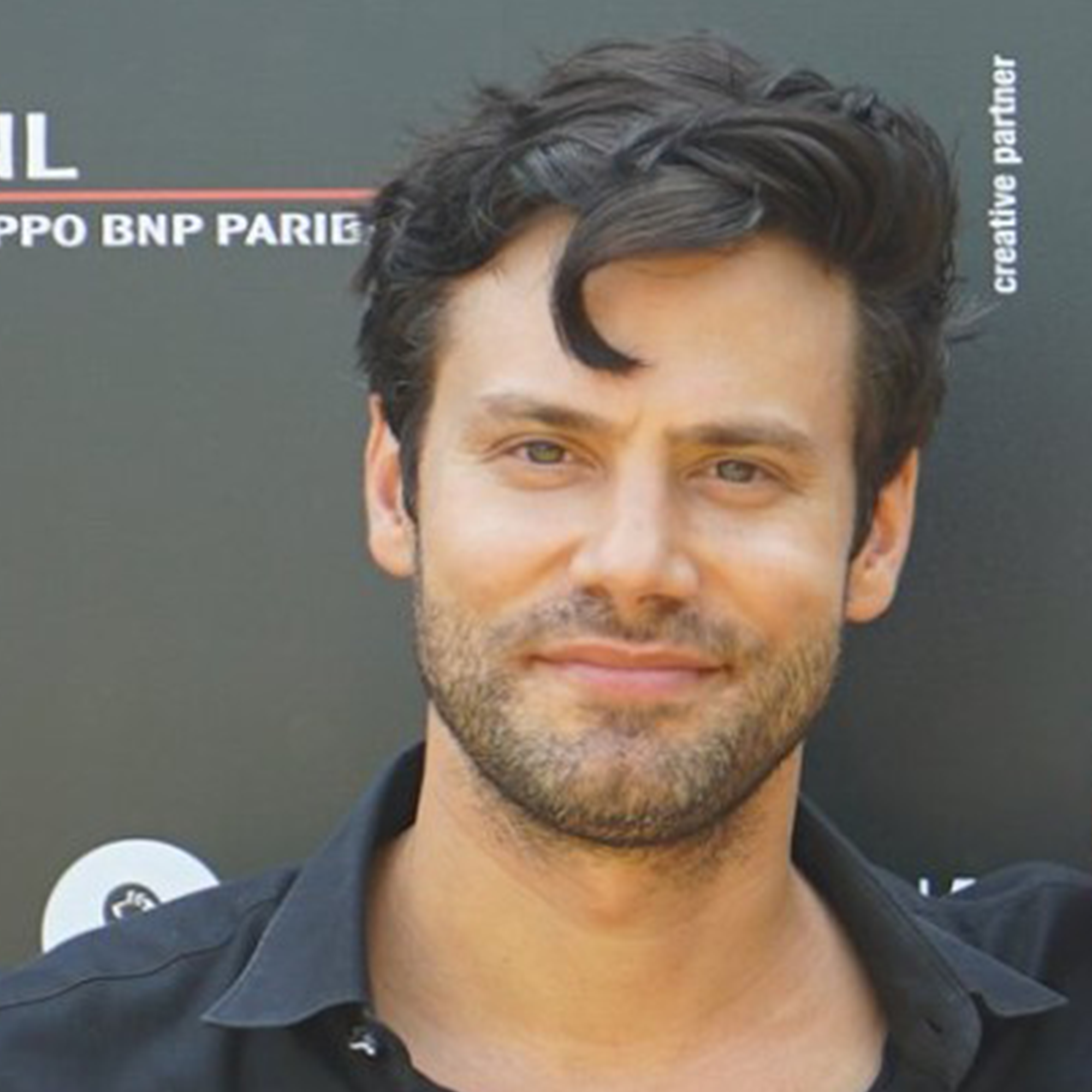
- Scott at the Venice Film Festival in 2019.
- Born: Columbus, Ohio, United States
- Occupations: Writer, Director, Executive Producer, Producer
- Years active: 2008—Present

Jared P. Scott is an American documentary writer, director, and producer. His films include The Age of Consequences, Requiem for the American Dream, The Great Green Wall, and Who Killed Robert Wone?

== Career ==
Scott is the director and executive producer of Who Killed Robert Wone?, a Peacock original documentary about the mysterious murder of Robert Eric Wone.

He is the writer, director and producer of The Great Green Wall. The film features Inna Modja following The Great Green Wall initiative and is executive produced by Fernando Meirelles (City of God) and Biz Stone.

Scott is the director and executive producer of Humanity Has Not Yet Failed, based on the words by Greta Thunberg. The film was released by New York Times Opinion.

He is one of three co-writers, directors and producers of Requiem for the American Dream, a New York Times Critics' Pick. The film was adapted into a book authored by Noam Chomsky.

== Filmography ==
Year	Title	Contribution	Note
2025	The Gilgo Beach Killer: House of Secrets	writer, director, executive producer	Documentary Series
2023	Who Killed Robert Wone?	writer, director, executive producer	Documentary
2021	Humanity Has Not Yet Failed	writer, director, executive producer	Short film
2019	The Great Green Wall	writer, director, producer	Documentary
2017	The Age of Consequences	writer, director, producer	Documentary
2016	Requiem for the American Dream	writer, director, producer	Documentary
2014	Disruption	writer, director, producer	Documentary
2014	Impossible	writer, director, producer	Short film
2014	Money is Material	writer, director, producer	Short film
2013	Do the Math	writer, director, producer	Documentary
2013	The Artificial Leaf	writer, director, producer	Short film
2012	Split: A Deeper Divide	producer	Documentary
2008	Split: A Divided America	producer	Documentary

== Books ==
- Chomsky, Noam (2017). Requiem for the American Dream: The 10 Principles of Concentration of Wealth & Power. Seven Stories. ISBN 978-1-60980-736-8. Co-created and edited by Jared P. Scott.

== Awards and nominations ==
Year	Result	Award	Category	Work	Ref.
2024	Nominated	News and Documentary Emmy Awards	Outstanding Achievement in Graphic Design or Animation	Who Killed Robert Wone?	
2024	Nominated	News and Documentary Emmy Awards	Outstanding Art Direction / Set Decoration / Scenic Design: Documentary	Who Killed Robert Wone?	
2022	Won	News and Documentary Emmy Awards	Outstanding News Analysis: Editorial and Opinion	Humanity Has Not Yet Failed	
2018	Nominated	News and Documentary Emmy Awards	Outstanding Politics and Government Documentary	The Age of Consequences	
2017	N/A	The New York Times Best Seller list	Paperback Nonfiction	Requiem for the American Dream: The 10 Principles of Concentration of Wealth & Power	
