= Lynn Leibovitz =

American judge (1959–2026)

Associate Judge of the Superior Court of the District of Columbia
- In office September 21, 2001 – June 11, 2026
- Appointed by: George W. Bush
- Preceded by: Stephen G. Milliken
- Succeeded by: vacant

Personal details
- Born: May 8, 1959 New York City, U.S.
- Died: June 11, 2026 (aged 67)
- Education: Brown University (BA); Georgetown University (JD)

Lynn Leibovitz (May 8, 1959 – June 11, 2026) was an American jurist who was an associate judge of the Superior Court of the District of Columbia.

== Early life and career ==
Leibovitz was born on May 8, 1959. She earned her Bachelor of Arts from Brown University in 1981, and her Juris Doctor from Georgetown University Law Center in 1985. After graduating, she clerked for Superior Court of the District of Columbia judge Robert I. Richter.

She joined the faculty of Georgetown University Law Center in 1997, where she served as an adjunct professor of trial advocacy until 2006.

=== D.C. superior court ===
On May 14, 2001, President George W. Bush nominated Leibovitz to be an associate judge of the Superior Court of the District of Columbia to the seat vacated by Judge Stephen G. Milliken. On July 26, 2001, the Senate Committee on Governmental Affairs held a hearing on her nomination. On August 2, 2001, the Committee reported her nomination favorably to the senate floor. On August 3, 2001, the full Senate confirmed her nomination by voice vote. She was sworn in on September 21, 2001. Her service terminated upon her death on June 11, 2026.

== Notable cases ==
In 2010, Judge Leibovitz presided over the Murder case of Robert Eric Wone, she found the three men involved not guilty on charges of conspiracy, obstruction of justice, and tampering with evidence.

== Personal life and death ==
Leibovitz was born and raised in New York City. In 1982, she moved to Washington D.C.. She was married and had two children.

Leibovitz died from glioblastoma on June 11, 2026, at the age of 67.
