= Lou Chibbaro Jr. =

American journalist

Lou Chibbaro Jr. is an American journalist best known for his efforts as senior news writer for the Washington Blade to chronicle the gay rights movement in the Washington metropolitan area and nationwide in the United States.

== Biography ==
Raised on Long Island, Chibbaro moved to Washington, D.C., in the early 1970s after completing an undergraduate degree. Chibbaro first came to Washington, D.C. in 1971 while a student a SUNY Brockport; he returned in 1975 to work and to earn a graduate degree in broadcast journalism.

In 1975, he came out to his parents about his sexuality. After telling them in person, he followed up his announcement with a "Dear Mom and Dad" letter that he hoped would help them understand. As he wrote them, "There are many who have advised me never to tell my parents I'm gay. I think it's to your credit that I can't do this. I just can't and won't live a lie!" While his mother was initially upset and his father worried about the prospects for his career if anyone found out that he was gay, his parents ultimately accepted his sexual orientation.

== Career ==
Lou Chibbaro Jr. wrote his earliest articles in the Washington Blade as a volunteer and under the pseudonym "Lou Romano", as at the time that he first began writing for the Blade, journalism careers could be ruined for being associated with a gay newspaper. To earn a living, Chibbaro worked first at Trends Publishing and then at American Public Power Association. In 1978, two years after he started volunteering at the Blade, he became self-employed as the publisher of a public utility newsletter; it was at that time that he dropped the use of the pseudonym in favor of using his real name. His decision to use his real name was spurred by a particularly gruesome event that he reported on in which 9 men died in a fire in a rundown adult theater that drove home to him the dangers of living a secret life.

As of 1984, he became a paid staff member. Even then, the income was not enough to live on and Chibbaro had to supplement his income from the newspaper by working as a cab driver for Red Top Cabs. During his time at the Blade, he covered such wide-ranging stories as the AIDS epidemic; political protests; murders, including the 1976 murder of one of the congressional staff members of Rep. Morris Udall at a gay cruising area; congressional members who were hiring male prostitutes; federal efforts targeting gay men for dismissal from their government jobs; to a gay ex-Marine who foiled an assassination attempt on the life of President Gerald Ford by grabbing the would-be assassins gun and deflecting the shot.

== Awards ==
=== National ===
In 2008, Chibbaro received the National Lesbian and Gay Journalists Association's Sarah Pettit Memorial Award for Excellence in LGBT Media Second Place Award.

He was inducted into the Society of Professional Journalists' Washington Pro Chapter's Hall of Fame in 2011, the first member of the LGBT community to do so, joining acclaimed journalists such as Helen Thomas and Bob Woodward.

=== Local awards ===
In 2009, Chibbaro received the Rainbow History Project's Community Pioneers Award.

In 2010, Chibbaro received the Gay and Lesbian Activists Alliance's Distinguished Service Award.

== Selected works ==
- Chibbaro Jr., Lou (November 9, 2001). "Gay Media Businesses Weigh Impact of Sept. 11 Attacks". Washington Blade.
- Chibbaro Jr., Lou (January 9, 2004). "Gays play key roles in Gephardt campaign: Elmendorf joins Mixner, Gephardt's lesbian daughter". Washington Blade. Archived from the original on September 11, 2006.
- Chibbaro Jr., Lou (March 19, 2004). "D.C. GOP'ers split on marriage". The Washington Blade.
- Chibbaro Jr., Lou (April 9, 2004). "Clinic criticized for 'silence' on smoking ban". The Washington Blade.
- Chibbaro Jr., Lou (January 14, 2005). "Davis reintroduces bill to ban gay marriage in D.C. GOP gains could aid Va. congresswoman's effort". The Washington Blade. Archived from the original on July 20, 2008. "D.C. Mayor Anthony Williams and a majority of the members of the D.C. Council have said they oppose DOMA laws and favor, in principle, the legalization of same-sex marriage."
- Chibbaro Jr., Lou (May 20, 2005). "Whitman-Walker Plans Layoffs, Program Cuts". The Washington Blade.
- Chibbaro Jr., Lou (June 10, 2005). "Politics Take Backseat at Pride". The Washington Blade.
- Chibbaro Jr., Lou (July 1, 2005). "Financial Crisis Prompts Pride Takeover Offer". The Washington Blade.
- Chibbaro Jr., Lou (July 8, 2005). "Capital Pride Director Quits Clinic". The Washington Blade.
- Chibbaro Jr., Lou (August 12, 2005). "Minority AIDS Groups Question Clinic Bailout". The Washington Blade.
- Chibbaro Jr., Lou (January 13, 2006). "Whitman-Walker Unveils Strategy for Turnaround". The Washington Blade.
- Chibbaro Jr., Lou (January 20, 2006). ""Most powerful" gay politician in the country". The Washington Blade. Archived from the original on June 27, 2006.
- Chibbaro Jr., Lou (September 15, 2006). "White House mum on AIDS director post: 'AIDS czar' position unfilled since February". The Washington Blade. Archived from the original on September 9, 2009.
- Chibbaro Jr., Lou (January 11, 2008). "More Changes Planned for Whitman-Walker". The Washington Blade.
- Chibbaro Jr., Lou (May 16, 2008). "Ziegfeld's/Secrets cleared for license in new location". The Washington Blade.
- Chibbaro Jr., Lou (July 20, 2006). "New Whitman-Walker Chief Fires Two Leaders". The Washington Blade.
- Chibbaro Jr., Lou (September 1, 2006). "Gay Pannell outpaces rival in race for shadow Senate seat". The Washington Blade. Archived from the original on September 24, 2007.
- Chibbaro Jr., Lou (May 30, 2008). "Activists alarmed over APA: Head of psychiatry panel favors 'change' therapy for some trans teens". The Washington Blade.
- Chibbaro Jr., Lou (June 20, 2008). "Whitman-Walker Sells HQ Building for $8 Million". The Washington Blade.
- Chibbaro Jr., Lou (July 18, 2008). "Clampitt withdraws from Council race, endorses Brown". The Washington Blade.
- Chibbaro Jr., Lou (August 1, 2008). "Wone murder remains unsolved 2 years later". The Washington Blade.
- Chibbaro Jr., Lou (September 16, 2008). "Schwartz launches write-in campaign". The Washington Blade.
- Chibbaro Jr., Lou (September 19, 2008). "D.C. Council may take up gay marriage bill in '09". The Washington Blade.
- Chibbaro Jr., Lou (October 20, 2008). "Police say Wone was drugged, sexually assaulted before murder". The Washington Blade.
- Chibbaro Jr., Lou (October 17, 2008). "Gay vote could be decisive in at-large Council race". The Washington Blade.
- Chibbaro Jr., Lou (December 5, 2008). "Gay Defendants Blast officials in Wone Case: Police Accused of Spreading 'Inflammatory Comments'". The Washington Blade. Archived from the original on December 7, 2008.
- Chibbaro Jr., Lou (May 1, 2009). "Missing e-Mails at Issue in Wone Murder: Timing of Deleted Messages Could Have Aided Defense: Attorneys". The Washington Blade.
- Chibbaro Jr., Lou (June 17, 2010). "Record Turnout for Pride". The Washington Blade.
- Chibbaro Jr., Lou (June 24, 2010). "Ray faces new opponent in primary race". The Washington Blade.
- Chibbaro Jr., Lou (August 2, 2010). "'Reel' Debt Delays Festival". The Washington Blade.
- Chibbaro Jr., Lou (February 3, 2011). "Md. lieutenant guv backs marriage bill". The Washington Blade.
- Chibbaro Jr., Lou (February 17, 2011). "Restructuring credited with Whitman-Walker revenue gains". The Washington Blade.
- Chibbaro Jr., Lou (April 27, 2011). "Whitman-Walker drops 'Clinic' from name". The Washington Blade.
- Chibbaro Jr., Lou (June 13, 2011). "Thousands Brave Heat for Pride Parade, Festival". The Washington Blade.
- Chibbaro Jr., Lou (September 1, 2011). "Choi trial halted after challenge to judge's ruling". The Washington Blade.
- Chibbaro Jr., Lou (January 31, 2012). "Gay ex-congressman shuns politics in Florida". The Washington Blade.
- Chibbaro Jr., Lou (March 14, 2012). "Whitman-Walker posts $2.6 million surplus". The Washington Blade.
- Chibbaro Jr., Lou (April 4, 2012). "Biddle wins 'gay' precincts, trails Orange in close race". The Washington Blade.
- Chibbaro Jr., Lou (April 22, 2012). "Stein Club endorses McDuffie in Ward 5 Council race". The Washington Blade.
- Chibbaro Jr., Lou (May 16, 2012). "McDuffie wins Ward 5 Council race". The Washington Blade.
