= Mette Hoffman Meyer =

Danish film producer

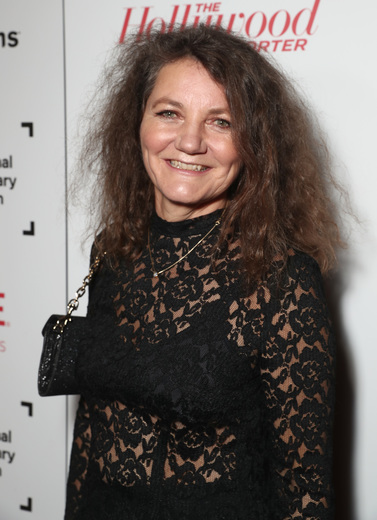
- Born: 1957 (age 68–69); Tebbestrup, Denmark.
- Occupation: Executive Producer
- Awards: Doc Mogul Award; Peabody Award

Mette Hoffman Meyer (born 1957) is a Danish documentary film producer. Based in Copenhagen, Denmark she is CEO of The Why Foundation, cofounder with an American-born British film director. Mette was previously head of documentaries and co-productions at Denmark’s public service broadcasting cooperation, DR, and commissioning editor of the factual series Dokumania on DR channel 2.

== Early life ==
Hoffman Meyer was born in Tebbestrup, Denmark, near the Jutland town of Randers, in 1957. When Hoffman Meyer was 11, her father, who managed the Thor brewery in Randers, was killed in an unguarded railroad crossing, and the family moved from their countryside home to an apartment. There Hoffman Meyer lived with her mother and five brothers for three years. Hoffman Meyer moved out alone as a 14-year-old to the alternative community Thylejren (Thy Camp), a settlement made up of tents and a group of people who uphold a hippie-ideal that began in the summer of 1970.

After a couple of years, Hoffman Meyer moved to Copenhagen. She moved in with an older brother, and worked as a music booking agent for Anne Linnet Band. She received her degree in business administration and economics.

== Career ==
Hoffman Meyer worked as a controller at Nordisk Film from 1988 to 1992, including in the TV entertainment programs Eleva2ren and Fak2ren. She then moved on to the Danish television station TV2, where she was the head of documentaries and co-production from 1992 to 2007.

Hoffman Meyer left TV2 for the same position at DR, the Danish public-service radio and television broadcasting company, a position she held for 9 years. Her responsibilities as head of documentaries and co-productions (also referred to as commissioning editor) included selecting and purchasing documentaries for all DR’s channels, primarily for DR channel 2. She co-founded the documentary slot “Dokumania” in 2008, which shows a combination of Danish-made and internationally acquired documentaries. She helped finance films like the Oscar-winning Taxi to the Dark Side, The Queen of Versailles, and the U.S.-Danish co-productions Pussy Riot: A Punk Prayer and the Sundance award-winning film The Red Chapel.

Hoffman Meyer stepped down from DR in October 2016 to focus full-time on The Why Foundation, an initiative she had co-founded with Nick Fraser (founder of BBC's documentary strand Storyville) in 2004. The Why is a nonprofit organization produces and distributes social justice-oriented documentary films world-wide. Their documentary series Why Poverty?, a series of eight films, aired by 70 broadcasters, reaching 180 countries and more than 500 million people worldwide. In their fourth documentary series called Why Slavery?, the films reached 191 countries through 70 TV stations, including BBC and BBC World News.

Hoffman Meyer has served as executive producer on the films Taxi to the Dark Side (2007), India’s Daughter (2015), Democrats (2016) and the Oscar-nominated film Last Men in Aleppo (2017), among others.

== Awards ==
In 2015 Hoffman Meyer was the recipient of the Doc Mogul award for her outstanding contributions to documentary film.

The Why Foundation’s documentary series Why Poverty? (2012) won a Peabody Award in 2013. Hoffman Meyer received the award along with Nick Fraser and Don Edkins.

== Personal life ==
Hoffman Meyer married Finn Meyer in 1984. Finn is an international senior partner at KPMG. Together they have two children, Charlotte, a financial analyst based in London, and Louis, who works in the Copenhagen film industry.
