= 43rd News and Documentary Emmy Awards =

- Date: September 28, 2022 (News Categories); September 29, 2022 (Documentary Categories)
- Location: Palladium Times Square, New York City
- Presented by: National Academy of Television Arts and Sciences
- Most awards: Frontline (4)
- Most nominations: VICE News Tonight and HBO Documentary Films (19)

Television/radio coverage
- Network: Watch.TheEmmys.TV

The 43rd News and Documentary Emmy Awards was presented by the National Academy of Television Arts and Sciences (NATAS), to honor the best in American news and documentary programming in 2021. The winners were announced on two ceremonies held at Palladium Times Square in New York City and live-streamed at Watch.TheEmmys.TV and other associated apps. The winners for the news categories were announced on September 28, 2022, while the ones for the documentary categories were revealed on September 29, 2022.

The nominees were announced on July 28, 2022, with Vice's news program VICE News Tonight and HBO's film unit HBO Documentary Films leading with 19 nominations each, while ABC was the most nominated network with 39. PBS NewsHour's anchor and managing editor Judy Woodruff and filmmaker and biologist Sir David Attenborough received the Lifetime Achievement Award at the news and documentary ceremonies, respectively.

== Winners and nominees ==
The nominees were announced on July 28, 2022. The winners are listed first and in bold.

=== Lifetime Achievement Award ===
- **Judy Woodruff** (news)
- **Sir David Attenborough** (documentary)

=== News Programming ===
Outstanding Live News Program	Outstanding Recorded News Program
**CBS Mornings / CBS This Morning (CBS)**; ABC World News Tonight with David Muir (ABC); Anderson Cooper 360° (CNN); NBC Nightly News with Lester Holt (NBC); The Lead with Jake Tapper (CNN); TODAY (NBC)	**60 Minutes (CBS)**; 20/20 (ABC); ABC News Soul of a Nation (ABC); CBS Sunday Morning (CBS); Nightline (ABC)
Outstanding Live Breaking News Coverage	Outstanding Edited Breaking News Coverage
**NBC News Specials: "January 6 Attack on the Capitol" (NBC)**; ABC News Special Events: "The January 6th Insurrection" (ABC); Belarus: Inside a Manufactured Migrant Crisis (CNN); CBS News: "Assault on the Capitol" (CBS); Haitians Converge on the U.S. Mexico Border (CNN); PBS NewsHour: "PBS NewsHour's Special Coverage of the Electoral College Count" (PBS)	**Vice News: "Inside the Battle for Jerusalem" (Vice)**; 60 Minutes: "January 6th" (reported by Lesley Stahl) (CBS); 60 Minutes: "The Beast 30." (CBS); A Reporter's Video from Inside the Capitol Siege (by Luke Mogelson) (The New Yorker); ABC News Originals for Hulu: "24 Hours: Assault on the Capitol" (Hulu); ABC World News Tonight with David Muir: "The Insurrection" (ABC)
Outstanding Continuing News Coverage: Short Form	Outstanding Continuing News Coverage: Long Form
**ABC World News Tonight with David Muir: "The Climate Crisis" (ABC)**; ABC World News Tonight with David Muir: "Afghanistan Unraveling" (ABC); NBC Nightly News with Lester Holt: "Richard Engel - Afghanistan Continuing Coverage" (NBC); The Coup in Myanmar (CNN); VICE News Tonight: "India's Deadly Delta Wave" (Vice); VICE News Tonight: "Battle for Care" (Vice); VICE News Tonight: "Haiti: Descent into Chaos" (Vice)	**VICE News Tonight: "Yemen: The Forgotten War" (Vice)**; 20/20: "George Floyd" (ABC); The Fall of Afghanistan (CNN); VICE News Tonight: "Taliban's Takeover of Afghanistan" (Vice); VICE News Tonight: "Six Weeks: Inside the Texas Abortion Ban" (Vice)
Outstanding Soft Feature Story: Short Form	Outstanding Soft Feature Story: Long Form
**ABC News Soul of a Nation: "Miss Lucille" (ABC)**; CNN Digital: "Running as Equals" (CNN); CNN Heroes: "Shirley Raines" (CNN); The Undefeated Presents: "Why We Kneel" (ESPN); Vice News: "Deaf in a Pandemic" (Vice)	**20/20: "The Babies of 9/11: Twenty Years Later" (reported by Diane Sawyer) (ABC)**; 48 Hours: "What Happened to the Perfect Child?" (reported by Troy Roberts) (CBS); 60 Minutes: "The Comeback" (reported by Norah O'Donnell) (CBS); The New York Times Opinion Video: "How Life Looks Through My ‘Whale Eyes’" (The New York Times); VICE News Tonight: "This Family of Black Cowboys Dates Back 5 Generations" (Vice)
Outstanding Hard News Feature Story: Short Form	Outstanding Hard News Feature Story: Long Form
**The Lead with Jake Tapper: "9-Year-Old Afghan Sold into Marriage" (reported by Anna Coren) (CNN)**; Axum: Journey to a Sacred City (reported by Nima Elbagir) (CNN); Chinese Detective Turned Whistleblower Reveals Torture Against Uyghurs (reported by Ivan Watson) (CNN); Searching for the Lost Graves of Louisiana's Enslaved People (The New York Times); VICE News Tonight: "The Central African Republic Is Enlisting Russians in its War Against Rebels" (Vice); VICE News Tonight: "Death Threats: Election Officials Call It Quits" (Vice)	**VICE News Tonight: "A Christian Summer Camp's History of Abuse" (Vice)**; ‘So They Know We Existed’: Palestinians Film War in Gaza (The New York Times); Day of Rage: How Trump Supporters Took the U.S. Capitol (The New York Times); Fault Lines: "Buried Truths: America's Indigenous Boarding Schools" (Al Jazeera International USA); NBC News Digital: "Southlake: Racial Reckoning in a Texas Suburb" (NBC)
Outstanding Investigative News Coverage: Short Form	Outstanding Investigative News Coverage: Long Form
**How a U.S. Drone Strike Killed the Wrong Person (by Christoph Koettl, Evan Hill, Matthieu Aikins, Eric Schmitt, Ainara Tiefenthäler and Drew Jordan) (The New York Times)**; Anderson Cooper 360°: "The Lost Children of Xinjiang" (reported by David Culver) (CNN); CBS Evening News with Norah O'Donnell: "Norah O'Donnell Investigates: A Silent Epidemic in the U.S. Military" (CBS); CBS Mornings and CBS Evening News: "Seatback Collapse" (reported by Kris Van Cleave) (CBS); Ethiopia: Exposing the Hallmarks of a Genocide (reported by Nima Elbagir) (CNN)	**Frontline: "Yemen's COVID Cover-Up" (reported by Nawal al-Maghafi of BBC News Arabic) (PBS)**; 60 Minutes: "Handcuffed to the Truth" (reported by Scott Pelley (CBS); Fault Lines: "Unrelinquished: When Abusers Keep Their Guns" (reported by Jennifer Gollan of The Center for Investigative Reporting) (Al Jazeera International USA); Frontline in partnership with the International Consortium of Investigative Journalists: "The Pandora Papers" (reported by Richard Bilton of Panorama) (PBS); Nightline: "Blindsided" (reported by Pete Madden and Ryan Smith (ABC); The Source: "The Shockwave" (directed by Paula Neudorf) (Vice)
Outstanding Live News Special	Outstanding Recorded News Special
**The 15th Annual CNN Heroes All-Star Tribute (hosted by Anderson Cooper and Kelly Ripa) (CNN)**; ABC News Live: "Mission to Mars, Live!" (ABC); ABC News Special Events: "The Inauguration of Joseph R. Biden Jr." (ABC); ABC News Special Events: "9/11 - Twenty Years Later - America Remembers" (ABC); Deadline: White House: "Lives Well Lived" (hosted by Nicolle Wallace) (MSNBC)	**60 Minutes: "9/11: The FDNY" (reported by Scott Pelley) (CBS)**; ABC News Soul of a Nation: "Reckonings" (ABC); ABC News Soul of a Nation: "Juneteenth: Together We Triumph" (hosted by Leslie Odom Jr. (ABC); CBS Sunday Morning: "Behind the Badge" (reported by Ted Koppel) (CBS); The Moms of Magnolia Street (reported by Melissa Colorado, Cheryl Hurd, Kris Sanchez) (NBC); Return of the Taliban: A VICE News Special Report (Hind Hassan, Ben Soloman, Seb Walker, and Isobel Yeung, correspondents (Showtime)
Outstanding News Discussion & Analysis	Outstanding News Analysis: Editorial and Opinion
**Meet the Press: "Schools, America & Race" (Chuck Todd with Nikole Hannah-Jones, Joshua Johnson and Keith Mayes) (NBC)**; A Fareed Zakaria Special: "A Radical Rebellion: The Transformation of the GOP" (CNN); CBS News Face the Nation: "Afghanistan's Collapse" (CBS); CBS News Face the Nation: "Dr. Deborah Birx: A COVID Autopsy" (CBS); The Circus: Inside the Greatest Political Show on Earth: "Reigning Chaos" (John Heilemann, Mark McKinnon, Alex Wagner and Jenn Palmieri) (Showtime); This Week with George Stephanopoulos: "Capitol Insurrection" (ABC)	**The New York Times Opinion Video: "Blue States, You're the Problem" (Johnny Harris and Binyamin Appelbaum) (The New York Times)**; **The New York Times Opinion Video: "Greta Thunberg Has Given Up on Politicians" (by Norma V. Toraya and Jared P. Scott) (The New York Times)**; Amanpour: "60 Years Ago, We Saw the Face of Evil" (by Elie Honig) (CNN); The New York Times Opinion Video: "Dying in the Name of Vaccine Freedom" (by Alexander Stockton and Lucy King) (The New York Times); The New York Times Opinion Video: "I'm a Trans Runner Struggling to Compete Fairly" (by Lindsay Crouse, Taige Jensen and Adam Wolffbrandt) (The New York Times)
Outstanding Live Interview	Outstanding Edited Interview
**The New York Times DealBook Summit: One-on-One with Adam Neumann (interviewed by Andrew Ross Sorkin (The New York Times)**; ABC News Live Prime: "Unvaccinated Patient in Hospital Pleads for Others to Get Vaccine" (reported by Haley Yamada) (ABC); Don Lemon Tonight: "Exclusive Interview with Officer Michael Fanone" (interviewed by Don Lemon) (CNN); Katy Tur Reports: "Haiti: Biden Administration Expels Migrants to Danger" (MSNBC); State of the Union: "Dealing with Tragedy: Jake Tapper Interviews Rep. Jamie Raskin After Son's Death and January 6" (interviewed by Jake Tapper) (CNN); State of the Union: "A Congressman's Final Words: Jake Tapper Speaks to Rep. Paul Mitchell on his Deathbed" (interviewed by Jake Tapper) (CNN)	**20/20: "Escape from a House of Horror" (reported by Diane Sawyer) (ABC)**; 60 Minutes: "The Facebook Whistleblower" (reported by Scott Pelley) (CBS); ABC News Soul of a Nation: "Officer Dunn: Capital Cop" (reported by Pierre Thomas) (ABC); ABC News Special Events: "Alec Baldwin Unscripted" (reported by George Stephanopoulos (ABC); CNN Special Report: "COVID WAR: The Pandemic Doctors Speak Out" (reported by Sanjay Gupta) (CNN)
Outstanding Science, Technology or Environmental Coverage	Outstanding Health or Medical Coverage
**CNN Special Report: "Eating Planet Earth: The Future of Your Food" (reported by Bill Weir) (CNN)**; **Unlivable Oasis (directed by Mauricio Rodríguez Pons and Elizabeth Weil) (ProPublica, TIME, Truly CA, Univision Noticias)**; **World News Tonight with David Muir/Nightline: "Madagascar: The Children of Climate Change" (reported by David Muir) (ABC)**; CBS News: CBS Mornings, CBS This Morning, and CBS Evening News with Norah O'Donnell: "CBS News: Eye on Earth" (CBS); Deforestation in the Deep: Forgotten Forests (CNN)	**VICE News Tonight: "Aging, Inc." (Vice)**; CNN Special Report: "WEED 6: Marijuana and Autism" (reported by Sanjay Gupta) (CNN); Nightline: "The Appointment" (reported by Rachel Scott) (ABC); The New York Times Opinion Video: "Death, Through a Nurse's Eyes" (by Alexander Stockton and Lucy King) (The New York Times); The New York Times Presents: "Move Fast & Vape Things" (directed by John Pappas) (FX)
Outstanding Arts, Culture or Entertainment Coverage	Outstanding Business, Consumer or Economic Coverage
**The New York Times Presents: "Malfunction: The Dressing Down of Janet Jackson" (FX)**; 20/20: "Something's Coming: West Side Story" (anchored by David Muir and Amy Robach) (ABC); 60 Minutes: "The Final Act" (reported by Anderson Cooper) (CBS); ABC News Live Prime: "Soul of a Nation: Tulsa's Buried Truth" (reported by Steve Osunsami) (ABC); The Story Of: "A Thousand Miles" (directed by Dan Zabludovsky) (Vice)	**FRONTLINE and The New York Times: "Boeing's Fatal Flaw" (reported by David Gelles, James Glanz, Natalie Kitroeff, and Jack Nicas) (PBS)**; 60 Minutes: "A New Model" (reported by Lesley Stahl) (CBS); ABC News Originals for Hulu: "GameStopped" (reported by Rebecca Jarvis) (Hulu); Bloomberg Quicktake: "The Paycheck: The Systemic Overtaxing of Black Homes in America" (Bloomberg News); FRONTLINE and NPR in conjunction with the Investigative Reporting Workshop: "The Healthcare Divide" (reported by Laura Sullivan) (PBS)
Outstanding Crime and Justice Coverage	Outstanding Emerging Journalist
**Get Away from the Target — Rescuing Migrants from the Libyan Coast Guard (directed by Ed Ou) (The Outlaw Ocean Project / The Guardian)**; 20/20: "George Floyd: A Man, A Moment, America Changed" (anchored by David Muir and Amy Robach) (ABC); 48 Hours: "The Station Nightclub Fire: Who's Responsible?" (reported by Jim Axelrod) (CBS); Dateline NBC: "The Investigation" (reported by Lester Holt) (NBC); Fault Lines: "The Jim Crow Convictions" (reported by Natasha Del Toro) (Al Jazeera International USA)	**Rachel Scott (ABC)**; Anna Kook (AJ+); Omar Jimenez (CNN); Antonia Hylton (NBC); Paola Ramos (Vice)
Best News Coverage: Short Form	Best News Coverage: Long Form
**How a U.S. Drone Strike Killed the Wrong Person (by Christoph Koettl, Evan Hill, Matthieu Aikins, Eric Schmitt, Ainara Tiefenthäler and Drew Jordan) (The New York Times)**; Ethiopia: Exposing the Hallmarks of a Genocide (reported by Nima Elbagir) (CNN); Proud Boys Were Key Instigators in Capitol Riot (by Deborah Acosta, Frank Matt, and Khadeeja Safdar) (The Wall Street Journal); The Coup in Myanmar (CNN); VICE News Tonight: "BANNED: A Woman's 200-Mile Journey to Get an Abortion" (Vice)	**Return of the Taliban: A VICE News Special Report (Hind Hassan, Ben Soloman, Seb Walker, and Isobel Yeung, correspondents (Showtime)**; Get Away from the Target — Rescuing Migrants from the Libyan Coast Guard (directed by Ed Ou) (The Outlaw Ocean Project / The Guardian); 60 Minutes: "9/11: The FDNY" (reported by Scott Pelley) (CBS); VICE News Tonight: "Taliban's Takeover of Afghanistan" (Vice); VICE News Tonight: "Yemen: The Forgotten War" (Vice)

=== Spanish Language Programming ===
Outstanding News Program in Spanish	Outstanding Journalist in Spanish Language Media
**Noticiero Univision (Univision)**; Al Punto (Univision); Aquí y Ahora (Univision); Noticias Telemundo en la Noche (Telemundo); Noticiero Telemundo (Telemundo)	**Vanessa Huac (Telemundo)**; Ilia Calderón (Univision); Cristina Londoño (Telemundo); Jorge Ramos (Univision); Teresa Rodriguez (Univision)
Outstanding Coverage of a Breaking News Story in Spanish	Outstanding Investigative Journalism in Spanish
**Noticiero Telemundo: "Enero 6 - Asalto a la Democracia" (Telemundo)**; Aquí y Ahora: "Crisis en Texas" (Univision); España: Volcán en Erupción (CNN en Español); Insurrección en el Capitolio (CNN en Español); Noticiero Univision: "Desafío a la Democracia" (Univision)	**Aquí y Ahora: "La Oscura Luz del Mundo" (Univision)**; Aquí y Ahora: "Guerra del Agua" (Univision); Noticiero Telemundo: "Secuestrados" (Telemundo); Noticiero Telemundo: "Coyotes" (Telemundo); Noticiero Telemundo: "Así son las Cocinas de los Narcos" (Telemundo)
Outstanding Feature Story in Spanish
**VICE News Tonight: "Después de la Tormenta" (Vice)**; Aquí y Ahora: "Carne de Cañón" (Univision); Noticiero Telemundo: "Galápagos, una Ventana hacia el Futuro" (Telemundo); Op-Docs: "The Death Cleaner" (by Louise Monlaü) (The New York Times); Op-Docs: "57 Days" (by Mario Lumbreras and Laura Brasero) (The New York Times); Univision News Digital: "La Lucha de Mujeres Negras e Hispanas Contra la Amenaza del Desalojo" (Univision)

=== Documentary Programming ===
Best Documentary	Outstanding Arts and Culture Documentary
**The First Wave (Hulu)**; Frontline: "A Thousand Cuts" (PBS); Frontline in partnership with ProPublica and Berkeley Journalism's Investigative Reporting Program: "American Insurrection" (directed by Richard Rowley and reported by A.C. Thompson) (PBS); HBO Documentary Films: "Four Hours at the Capitol" (HBO); HBO Documentary Films: "A Choice of Weapons: Inspired by Gordon Parks" (HBO); HBO Documentary Films: "In the Same Breath" (HBO); HBO Documentary Films: "Obama: In Search of a More Perfect Union" (HBO); MSNBC Films: "Paper and Glue" (MSNBC); The Line (directed by Jeff Zimbalist and Doug Shultz) (Apple TV+); The Rescue (National Geographic)	**HBO Documentary Films: "Street Gang: How We Got to Sesame Street" (HBO)**; HBO Documentary Films: "A Choice of Weapons: Inspired by Gordon Parks" (HBO); MSNBC Films: "Paper and Glue" (MSNBC); The One and Only Dick Gregory (Showtime); The Real Charlie Chaplin (Showtime)
Outstanding Current Affairs Documentary	Outstanding Social Issue Documentary
**The Rescue (National Geographic)**; 137 Shots (Netflix); Convergence: Courage in a Crisis (Netflix); Frontline: "China's COVID Secrets" (directed by Jane McMullen for the BBC) (PBS); Frontline in partnership with ProPublica and Berkeley Journalism's Investigative Reporting Program: "American Insurrection" (directed by Richard Rowley and reported by A.C. Thompson) (PBS); HBO Documentary Films: "In the Same Breath" (HBO)	**Frontline: "A Thousand Cuts" (PBS)**; CNN Films: "Dreamland: The Burning of Black Wall Street" (CNN); End of the Line: The Women of Standing Rock (Fuse); MSNBC Films: "In the Dark of the Valley" (MSNBC); Pray Away (Netflix); The New York Times Presents: "To Live and Die in Alabama" (FX)
Outstanding Politics and Government Documentary	Outstanding Business and Economic Documentary
**POV: "Mayor" (PBS)**; 3212 Un-Redacted (reported by James Gordon Meek) (ABC); HBO Documentary Films: "Obama: In Search of a More Perfect Union" (HBO); HBO Max: "A La Calle" (HBO); Turning Point: 9/11 and the War on Terror (Netflix)	**WeWork: Or the Making and Breaking of a $47 Billion Unicorn (Hulu)**; Frontline and Chasing the Dream: "The Power of the Fed" (by Anya Bourg and James Jacoby) (PBS); Independent Lens: "Storm Lake" (PBS); Local, USA: "Entangled" (by David Abel and Andy Laub) (WORLD Channel); Vice News: "The Big Squeeze" (directed by Samuel Black) (Vice)
Outstanding Investigative Documentary	Outstanding Historical Documentary
**HBO Documentary Films: "The Forever Prisoner" (HBO)**; Assassins (Starz); Frontline: "Escaping Eritrea" (directed by Evan Williams) (PBS); Frontline: "In the Shadow of 9/11" (directed by Dan Reed) (PBS); The Line (directed by Jeff Zimbalist and Doug Shultz) (Apple TV+)	**9/11: One Day in America (National Geographic)**; Desert One (History Channel); Downing of a Flag (directed by Scott Galloway) (PBS); POV: "The Neutral Ground" (directed by CJ Hunt and Darcy McKinnon) (PBS); The Black Church: This Is Our Story, This Is Our Song (hosted by Henry Louis Gates Jr.) (PBS)
Outstanding Science and Technology Documentary	Outstanding Nature Documentary
**CNN Films: "The Hunt for Planet B" (directed by Nathaniel Kahn) (CNN)**; Down to Earth: The Astronaut's Perspective (directed by Jason Clemons) (NASA TV); Fathom (Apple TV+); Independent Lens: "Coded Bias" (PBS); NOVΛ: "Picture a Scientist" (PBS)	**Puff: Wonders of the Reef (Netflix)**; Lucy the Human Chimp (directed by Alex Parkinson) (HBO / HBO Max); Nature: "The Elephant and the Termite" (directed by Mark Deeble and Victoria Stone) (PBS); Nature: "My Garden of a Thousand Bees" (directed by Martin Dohrn) (PBS); Playing with Sharks (directed by Sally Aitken) (Disney+)
Outstanding Crime and Justice Documentary	Outstanding Short Documentary
**HBO Documentary Films: "Life of Crime 1984-2020" (directed by Jon Alpert) (HBO)**; Buried (directed by Yotam Guendelman and Ari Pines) (Showtime); HBO Documentary Films: "The Murders at Starved Rock" (directed by Jody McVeigh-Schultz) (HBO); HBO Documentary Films: "The Slow Hustle" (directed by Sonja Sohn) (HBO); Trafficked with Mariana van Zeller (National Geographic)	**Through Our Eyes: "Apart" (directed by Geeta Gandbhir and Rudy Valdez) (HBO / HBO Max)**; A Broken House (directed by Jimmy Goldblum) (The New Yorker); HBO Documentary Films: "The Last Cruise" (HBO); Op-Docs: "Takeover" (directed by Emma Francis-Snyder) (The New York Times); Through Our Eyes: "Shelter" (directed by Smriti Mundhra) (HBO / HBO Max)

=== Craft ===
Outstanding Cinematography: Documentary	Outstanding Video Journalism: News
**The First Wave – Brian Dawson, Matthew Heineman, Ross McDonnell, Alex Pritz, Thorsten Thielow (Hulu)**; Buried (Showtime); Nature: "Pumas: Legends of the Ice Mountains" (PBS); Nature: "The Elephant and the Termite" (PBS); Puff: Wonders of the Reef (Netflix); The Reason I Jump (Netflix)	**Return of the Taliban: A VICE News Special Report – Daniel Bateman, Adam Desiderio, Ben Foley, Gelareh Kiazand, Javier Manzano, Tarek Turkey, Joe Hill, Juan Carlos Quintero, Ben C. Solomon (Showtime)**; **VICE News Tonight: "Inside the Battle for Jerusalem" – Daniel Bateman, Ayman Abu Ramouz, Oren Rosenfeld, Lama Al-Arian (Vice)**; 60 Minutes: "The Green River Drift" (CBS); Unlivable Oasis (ProPublica, TIME, Truly CA, Univision Noticias); VICE News Tonight: "After the Flood" (Vice)
Outstanding Direction: News	Outstanding Direction: Documentary
**ABC News Soul of a Nation: "Juneteenth: Together We Triumph" – Tine Fields (ABC)**; 20/20: "911 Babies: Twenty Years Later" – Michaela Dowd (ABC); ABC News Soul of a Nation – James Adolphus (ABC); January 6th – Reza Baktar (CNN); The 15th Annual CNN Heroes All-Star Tribute – Brett Kelly (CNN)	**The Rescue – Elizabeth Chai Vasarhelyi, Jimmy Chin (National Geographic)**; HBO Documentary Films: "In the Same Breath" – Nanfu Wang (HBO); HBO Documentary Films: "Simple as Water" – Megan Mylan (HBO); Misha and the Wolves – Sam Hobkinson (Netflix); The First Wave – Matthew Heineman (Hulu)
Outstanding Editing: News	Outstanding Editing: Documentary
**Vice News: "The Shockwave" – Karim Lopez (Vice)**; 20/20: "George Floyd: A Man, A Moment, America Changed" (ABC); Day of Rage: How Trump Supporters Took the U.S. Capitol (The New York Times); Return of the Taliban: A VICE News Special Report (Showtime); Unlivable Oasis (ProPublica, TIME, Truly CA, Univision Noticias)	**The First Wave – Francisco Bello, Matthew Heineman, Gabriel Rhodes, David Zieff (Hulu)**; 9/11: Inside the President's War Room (Apple TV+); HBO Documentary Films: "A Choice of Weapons: Inspired by Gordon Parks" (HBO); HBO Documentary Films: "Four Hours at the Capitol" (HBO); Vice News: "Toxic Pigs of Fukushima" (Vice)
Outstanding Graphic Design and Art Direction: News	Outstanding Graphic Design and Art Direction: Documentary
**CNN Digital: "The Hippie Trail" – Ignacio Osorio, Agne Jurkenaite, Emma Beinish, Daisy Mella Roca (CNN)**; ABC News Soul of a Nation: "Graphic Open" (ABC); CNN Digital: "QAnon Letter" (CNN); The New York Times Opinion Video: "Joe Did It. But How?" (The New York Times); The Secret IRS Files (ProPublica); VICE News Tonight: "Pandemic Time" (Vice)	**CNN Films: "Dreamland: The Burning of Black Wall Street" (CNN)**; Camp Confidential: America's Secret Nazis (Netflix); Coded: The Hidden Love of J.C. Leyendecker (MTV Documentary Films); Gossip (Showtime); Vox: "Missing Chapter" (Vox)
Outstanding Research: News	Outstanding Research: Documentary
**Ethiopia: Exposing the Hallmarks of a Genocide – Barbara Arvanitidis, Nima Elbagir, Bethlehem Feleke, Eliza MacIntosh, Gianluca Mezziofiore, Katie Polglase (CNN)**; **Vice News: "The Shockwave" – Lama Al-Arian, Paula Neudorf, Jawad Rizkallah, Lindsey Schneider (Vice)**; 20/20: "Nowhere to Run: The Ahmaud Arbery Story" (ABC); The New York Times Presents: "Move Fast & Vape Things" (FX); VICE News Tonight: "Handle With Care: Investigating the For-Profit Foster Care System" (Vice)	**The Rescue – Santipong Changpuak, Susan Johnson, Chloe Mamelok, Thanet Natisri, Claudia Phaa Rowe (National Geographic)**; 9/11: I Was There (History Channel); 9/11: One Day in America (National Geographic); HBO Documentary Films: "Street Gang: How We Got to Sesame Street" (HBO); Independent Lens: "Cured" (PBS)
Outstanding Lighting Direction and Scenic Design	Outstanding Technical Achievement
**ABC News Soul of a Nation: "Andra Day Performance" – Chad Phillips (ABC)**; 3A Studio Build (MSNBC); 9/11: One Day in America (National Geographic); CNN Films: "The Lost Sons" (CNN); Procession (Netflix)	**TODAY: "Jenna Skydives Live with U.S. Army" – Patti Armstrong, Dave Auerbach, Billy Chin, Barry Cruz, Kim Doughery, James Dugan, Jonas Einstein, Brian Gessner, Jim Green, Cate Gropper, Erik Haas, Doug Hamilton, Kylie Haoues, Gavin Hartman, Craig Hopkins, Jim Hughes, Josh Hunter, Brian Iacone, Ryan Kiernan, Evan Klupt, Adrian Kotiga, Erica Levens, Jay Lopez, Don Lynch, Jesse Maggio, Lee McKinney, Lee Miller, Steve Mitnick, Reid Murtaugh, JP Park, Paul Rigney, Mike Ruiz, Andy Schritchfield (NBC)**; 48 Hours and CBS News: "The Queen Carries On: A Gayle King Special" (CBS); ABC News Live: "Mission to Mars, Live!" (ABC); CBS Mornings: "NEW Challenge" (CBS)
Outstanding Music Composition	Outstanding Sound
**The Reason I Jump – Nainita Desai (Netflix)**; 9/11: One Day in America (National Geographic); Camp Confidential: America's Secret Nazis (Netflix); The First Wave (Hulu); The Real Charlie Chaplin (Showtime); Woman In Motion (Paramount+)	**Fathom – Nick Ryan, Laurence Love Greed, Glenn Eanes, Bastien Benkhelil, Ben Baird, Brad Engleking (Apple TV+)**; 9/11: I Was There (History Channel); Independent Lens: "Mr. Soul!" (PBS); The First Wave (Hulu); The Reason I Jump (Netflix); Watch the Sound with Mark Ronson (Apple TV+)
Outstanding Writing: News	Outstanding Writing: Documentary
**20/20: "Escape from a House of Horror" – Diane Sawyer (ABC)**; 60 Minutes: "9/11: The FDNY" (CBS); 60 Minutes: "Handcuffed to the Truth" (CBS); ABC News Live Prime: "Soul of a Nation: Tulsa's Buried Truth" (ABC); Return of the Taliban: A VICE News Special Report (Showtime)	**Nature: "The Elephant and the Termite" – Mark Deeble (PBS)**; 9/11: One Day in America (National Geographic); HBO Documentary Films: "The Forever Prisoner" (HBO); The Rescue (National Geographic); Trafficked with Mariana van Zeller: "Outlaw Motorcycle Clubs" (National Geographic); Trafficked with Mariana van Zeller: "Romance Scams" (National Geographic)
Outstanding Interactive Media	Outstanding Interactive Media: Innovation
**Re-Educated (The New Yorker)**; Alchemy Immersive: "Kingdom of Plants with David Attenborough" (Oculus TV); Alchemy Immersive: "David Attenborough's First Life" (Oculus TV); CNN Visuals: "Assault on Democracy: Paths to the Insurrection" (CNN); The New York Times Opinion Video: "Postcards from a World on Fire" (The New York Times)	**Frontline: "Un(re)solved" (PBS)**; Goliath: Playing with Reality (Oculus); Inaccessible Cities (AJ Contrast / Al Jazeera Digital); POV: "The Changing Same: American Pilgrimage" (POV); What the 1921 Tulsa Race Massacre Destroyed (The New York Times)
Outstanding Promotional Announcement
**9/11: One Day in America – Chris Spencer, Tyler Korba, Carla Daeninckx, Daniela Delgado, Isabella Alonzo, Maricruz Merlo (National Geographic)**; Becoming Cousteau (Disney+); History of the Sitcom Campaign (CNN); The First Wave (Hulu); Trafficked with Mariana van Zeller (National Geographic)

=== Regional News ===
Outstanding Regional News Story: Spot or Breaking News	Outstanding Regional News Story: Investigative Report
**Battleground Salt Lake (KSL 5-TV – Salt Lake City, UT)**; 7 News at Six: "Surfside Condo Collapse" (WSVN-TV – Miami, FL); Local 10 News: "Condo Collapse - The 10:00 Hour" (WPLG-TV – Miami-Fort Lauderdale, FL); NBC 7 News at 11: "Wildfire Triggers Evacuations" (KNSD-TV – San Diego, CA); WAVE 3 News: "Louisville's First Weekend of Protests" (WAVE 3 – Louisville, KY); WFAA at 10pm: "Not Cancun..." (WFAA-TV – Dallas-Fort Worth, TX)	**CBS 2 Chicago 10pm: "My Name Is Anjanette Young" (WBBM-TV – Chicago, IL)**; ABC15 News: "Full Disclosure" (KNXV-TV – Phoenix, AZ); KARE 11 News: "KARE 11 Investigates: Cruel & Unusual" (KARE-TV – Minneapolis, MN); FOX31: "Police, Paramedics, and Ketamine: What Happened to Elijah McClain" (KDVR-TV – Denver, CO); Believe Them (WXIA-TV – Atlanta, GA)

== Multiple nominations ==
Shows that received multiple nominations
Nominations	Program	Network
19	VICE News Tonight	Vice
19	HBO Documentary Films	HBO
13	Frontline	PBS
13	60 Minutes	CBS
10	20/20	ABC
9	ABC News Soul of a Nation	ABC
8	The New York Times Opinion Video	The New York Times
7	The First Wave	Hulu
6	Vice News	Vice
6	9/11: One Day in America	National Geographic
6	Noticiero Telemundo	Telemundo
5	Nature	PBS
5	The Rescue	National Geographic
5	Return of the Taliban: A VICE News Special Report	Showtime
5	Aquí y Ahora	Univision
4	ABC World News Tonight with David Muir	ABC
4	CNN Films	CNN
4	Independent Lens	PBS
4	Trafficked with Mariana van Zeller	National Geographic
4	The New York Times Presents	FX
3	ABC News Live Prime	ABC
3	ABC News Special Events	ABC
3	Nightline	ABC
3	CNN Digital	CNN
3	Ethiopia: Exposing the Hallmarks of a Genocide	CNN
3	CNN Special Report	CNN
3	48 Hours	CBS
3	Op-Docs	The New York Times
3	The Reason I Jump	Netflix
3	MSNBC Films	MSNBC
3	Fault Lines	Al Jazeera International USA
3	Unlivable Oasis	ProPublica, TIME, Truly CA, Univision Noticias
2	ABC News Live	ABC
2	Anderson Cooper 360°	CNN
2	State of the Union	CNN
2	The 15th Annual CNN Heroes All-Star Tribute	CNN
2	The Coup in Myanmar	CNN
2	The Lead with Jake Tapper	CNN
2	POV	PBS
2	CBS Sunday Morning	CBS
2	CBS News Face the Nation	CBS
2	Day of Rage: How Trump Supporters Took the U.S. Capitol	The New York Times
2	How a U.S. Drone Strike Killed the Wrong Person	The New York Times
2	Camp Confidential: America's Secret Nazis	Netflix
2	Puff: Wonders of the Reef	Netflix
2	Buried	Showtime
2	The Real Charlie Chaplin	Showtime
2	Noticiero Univision	Univision
2	NBC Nightly News with Lester Holt	NBC
2	TODAY	NBC
2	ABC News Originals for Hulu	Hulu
2	Fathom	Apple TV+
2	The Line	Apple TV+
2	Desert One	History Channel
2	Alchemy Immersive	Oculus
2	Get Away from the Target — Rescuing Migrants from the Libyan Coast Guard	The Outlaw Ocean Project / The Guardian

Nominations by Network
Nominations	Network
39	ABC
37	CNN
28	PBS
28	Vice
26	CBS
23	HBO
19	The New York Times
15	National Geographic
13	Netflix
12	Showtime
12	Univision
10	NBC
10	Hulu
9	Telemundo
6	Apple TV+
6	MSNBC
4	FX
3	Al Jazeera International USA
3	History Channel
3	ProPublica, TIME, Truly CA, Univision Noticias
3	The New Yorker
3	Oculus
2	CNN en Español
2	Disney+
2	The Outlaw Ocean Project / The Guardian

== Multiple wins ==
Shows that received multiple wins
Wins	Program	Network
4	Frontline	PBS
3	The First Wave	Hulu
3	The Rescue	National Geographic
3	HBO Documentary Films	HBO
2	The New York Times Opinion Video	The New York Times
2	How a U.S. Drone Strike Killed the Wrong Person	The New York Times
2	60 Minutes	CBS
2	Return of the Taliban: A VICE News Special Report	Showtime
2	9/11: One Day in America	National Geographic
2	CNN Films	CNN

Wins by Network
Wins	Network
9	ABC
8	Vice
8	National Geographic
7	CNN
6	PBS
5	The New York Times
4	HBO
3	CBS
3	NBC
2	Showtime
2	Telemundo
2	Univision
2	Netflix
