= List of Vice episodes =

VICE is a documentary series that debuted on HBO on April 5, 2013. Created and hosted by VICE founder Shane Smith, the series uses immersionist style of documentary filmmaking to cover various topics from around the world for each episode that were told by its respective correspondent.

Seasons 3 and 4 were commissioned on May 7, 2014. On March 26, 2015, HBO renewed VICE through 2018 which includes four additional seasons. The 18-episode fifth season, slated to air on February 24, 2017, received an additional twelve episodes that brought the season to a total of 30 episodes.

The series was picked up by Showtime after being cancelled by HBO, and resumed on March 29, 2020. In July 2023, the series was removed from the Showtime streaming app, with Vice News shopping it to other outlets.

During the course of the series, 164 episodes of VICE aired over ten seasons.

== Series overview ==
Season	Episodes	Originally released		
Season	Episodes	First released	Last released	Network
1	10	April 5, 2013	June 14, 2013	HBO
2	12	March 14, 2014	June 13, 2014	HBO
3	14	March 6, 2015	June 26, 2015	HBO
4	18	February 5, 2016	July 1, 2016	HBO
5	29	February 24, 2017	October 13, 2017	HBO
6	30	April 6, 2018	December 14, 2018	HBO
7	13	March 29, 2020	June 21, 2020	Showtime
8	15	March 7, 2021	December 26, 2021	Showtime
9	16	May 1, 2022	September 18, 2022	Showtime
10	7	May 7, 2023	June 25, 2023	Showtime

== Episodes ==
=== Season 1 (2013) ===
No. overall	No. in season	Title	Original release date
1	1	"Killer Kids"	April 5, 2013
Assassination Nation: Political assassinations in the Philippines. The Killer Kids of the Taliban: Taliban-supported child suicide bombers in Afghanistan.
2	2	"Bad Borders"	April 12, 2013
Escape from North Korea: Desperate defectors flee North Korea. The World's Most Dangerous Border: Kashmir's line of control – the world's most dangerous place.
3	3	"Guns & Ammo"	April 19, 2013
Gun School: Armed preparedness in a New Mexico school. Toxic Iraq: The human toll of post-war toxic waste in Iraq.
4	4	"Love & Rockets"	April 26, 2013
Chinese Cockblock: The plight of desperate bachelors in China. European Meltdown: Ultra-extreme reactions to the economic crisis in Europe.
5	5	"Winners & Losers"	May 3, 2013
Mormon Lost Boys: Exiled sons of polygamists. The Fat Farms of Mauritania: Fat farms for Mauritanian women. Mumbai Slumscraper: Have and have-nots in Mumbai.
6	6	"Corruption"	May 10, 2013
China's Ghost Towns: How China's appetite for housing created huge ghost cities. Egypt on the Brink: The violent aftermath of Arab Spring in Egypt.
7	7	"Addiction"	May 17, 2013
Tobaccoland: Tobacco obsession in Indonesia. Underground Heroin Clinic: Treating heroin addiction with hallucinogens in Mexico.
8	8	"Fighting Chances"	May 31, 2013
Senegalese Laamb Wrestling: Laamb wrestling in Senegal. The World is Sinking: The rising tide of climate change.
9	9	"Gangs & Oil"	June 7, 2013
Chiraq: Failed state on the south side of Chicago. Nigeria's Oil Pirates: Oil drilling in the Niger River Delta.
10	10	"The Hermit Kingdom"	June 14, 2013
Basketball Diplomacy: Vice makes history on a trip to North Korea to play hoops and meet with "supreme leader" Kim Jong-un.

=== Season 2 (2014) ===
No. overall	No. in season	Title	Original release date
11	1	"Afghan Money Pit & The Pacification of Rio"	March 14, 2014
Investigating the misuse of American taxpayer dollars intended for the reconstruction in Afghanistan; the city of Rio de Janeiro takes extreme measures to remedy its reputation as a drug and murder capital.
12	2	"Greenland Is Melting & Bonded Labor"	March 21, 2014
High temperatures in Greenland cause melting which results in a rising sea level; examining the conditions that bonded laborers endure while working in Pakistan's brick kilns.
13	3	"American Scrap & Children of the Drones"	March 28, 2014
Examining the life cycle of scrap metal; investigating the effect of drone strikes in Pakistan.
14	4	"A Syria Of Their Own & White Gold"	April 4, 2014
Thomas goes to the frontline of the battle for a Kurdish state to follow the story of Syria's forgotten ethnic group, the Kurds; rhino horn has been coveted in Eastern medicine for centuries. Vikram Gandhi traces the trade from Southern Africa to Vietnam to understand this illicit phenomenon which has been on the rise.
15	5	"Terrorist University & Armageddon Now"	April 11, 2014
Shane goes to Dagestan to see what makes it the world capital of terrorist training and recruitment; Thomas joins a group of born again Christians as they tour the Holy Land and find out the real reason why they support Israel.
16	6	"Rocky Mountain High & North Korean Defectors"	April 25, 2014
Impact of legalized marijuana in Colorado; the struggles of North Korean defectors relocating to South Korea.
17	7	"The Pink Gang Rebellion & Genetic Passport"	May 2, 2014
Women take a stand against rape in India; repercussions of nuclear radiation in Kazakhstan.
18	8	"The Resource Curse & Deliver Us from Drought"	May 9, 2014
Natural-gas opportunities and opposition in Papua New Guinea; Drought and denial in Texas.
19	9	"Crude Awakening & The Enemy of My Enemy"	May 16, 2014
Examining the lasting effects of the 2010 oil spill in the Gulf of Mexico; Yemen's Houthi rebel movement.
20	10	"Playing with Nuclear Fire & No Man Left Behind"	May 23, 2014
Investigating the Fukushima nuclear disaster in Japan; veterans struggling with mental illness and addiction.
21	11	"Heroin Warfare & The Coldest War"	June 6, 2014
The heroin epidemic in Iran; how global warming is re-igniting the Cold War.
22	12	"Surveillance City & The Forgotten War"	June 13, 2014
Futuristic police surveillance in Camden, NJ; genocide in Sudan leads to overburdened refugee camps and rebel groups preparing for a fight for justice.

=== Season 3 (2015) ===
No. overall	No. in season	Title	Original release date	U.S. viewers (millions)
23	1	"Our Rising Oceans"	March 6, 2015	N/A
Shane travels to Antarctica to investigate the West Antarctic ice sheet and see how the continent is melting.
24	2	"To Serve and Protect & Coming to America"	March 13, 2015	0.57
The shooting of Michael Brown in Ferguson, MO sparks a series of protests and a fierce debate about the militarization of the U.S. police force; thousands of Central Americans embark on a perilous journey to emigrate to the United States.
25	3	"We the People & Countdown to Extinction"	March 20, 2015	0.60
A study lists domestic right-wing groups as two of the top three terrorist threats in America; the global damage caused by overfishing in the oceans.
26	4	"Lines in the Sand & Outsourcing Embryos"	March 27, 2015	0.55
Exploring the cocaine trafficking hotspots of South America and Africa to determine who is profiting from the increase in cocaine use in Europe; investigating the commercial surrogacy industry in India.
27	5	"Synthetic Drug Revolution & Transsexuals of Iran"	April 10, 2015	N/A
Tracking the rise of synthetic drugs; homosexuals and transsexuals in Iran navigate a terrifying cultural landscape.
28	6	"The Post-Antibiotic World & Indonesia's Palm Bomb"	April 17, 2015	N/A
The overuse of antibiotics leads to dire consequences, causing scientists to search for new natural sources of anti-bacterial compounds; as the demand for palm oil grows, growers in Indonesia push farther onto rainforest land, torching the forests.
29	7	"Sweet Home Alabama & Haitian Money Pit"	April 24, 2015	N/A
Alabama passes a harsh anti-immigrant law; Haiti receives billions in aid money after an earthquake.
30	8	"Egyptian Tomb Raiders & Rent a White Guy"	May 1, 2015	0.68
In Egypt, looters steal artifacts; the white male is seen as a symbol of cultural cachet in China
31	9	"Savior Seeds & India's Water Crisis"	May 8, 2015	0.58
The effects of planting genetically modified seeds; India struggles to provide adequate clean water and sanitation systems for its growing population.
32	10	"A Prayer for Uganda & Kidneyville"	May 15, 2015	0.55
Anti-gay leaders teach intolerance to Uganda's youth; exploring the thriving illegal market for kidneys in Bangladesh.
33	11	"Evolution of a Plague & Campus Coverup"	June 5, 2015	0.54
People attempt to control the outbreak of Ebola in West Africa; examining the recent rise in reports of sexual assaults on U.S. campuses.
34	12	"Enemies at the Gates & Global Jihad"	June 12, 2015	0.67
Saudi Arabia attempts to defend itself against terrorist organizations; examining why young men and women in Europe are drawn to ISIS.
35	13	"Afghanistan After Us & La Haine"	June 19, 2015	0.81
Afghanistan's war against the Taliban; religious tensions spiral out of control in France.
36	14	"Cold War 2.0"	June 26, 2015	0.73
Shane meets with Kremlin officials and American leaders to discuss the rising tensions between the U.S. and Russia. Examining the Russo-Ukrainian war.

=== Season 4 (2016) ===
No. overall	No. in season	Title	Original release date	U.S. viewers (millions)
37	1	"Boko Haram & Unnatural Selection"	February 5, 2016	N/A
The Nigerian government is determined to drive militants from a terrorist group out of the country; a new gene-editing method allow scientists to change the genetic traits of plants and animals.
38	2	"Escape to Europe & Cycle of Terror"	February 12, 2016	N/A
Following the refugee trail from the Syrian border to Europe; the global reaction to the terrorist attack in Paris impacts the fight against terrorism.
39	3	"Right to Die"	February 19, 2016	N/A
Exploring the moral, political and personal questions raised by euthanasia.
40	4	"Beating Blindness & White Collar Weed"	February 26, 2016	0.54
Doctors and researchers make incredible strides in the fight against blindness; struggling small-scale marijuana farmers face corporate takeovers as the end of the pot-prohibition nears
41	5	"Meathooked & End of Water"	March 4, 2016	N/A
Examining the environmental harm of industrial meat operations; assessing the depths of the world's water crisis.
42	6	"Return to Yemen & Church and States"	March 11, 2016	0.52
Examining the conflict in Yemen; exploring the ongoing battle for LGBT equal rights in the United States.
43	7	"Palestine Now & Viva Cuba Libre"	March 25, 2016	0.63
Exploring the lives of young Palestinians today; examining the political thawing of relationships between Cuba and the United States.
44	8	"Afghan Women's Rights & Floating Armories"	April 8, 2016	N/A
Violence and oppression are still a fact of life for women in Afghanistan; private military contractors protect global commerce.
45	9	"The Future of Energy"	April 15, 2016	N/A
Examining the future of how to make and use energy and how to meet the growing demand as carbon emissions are cut.
46	10	"Trump in Dubai & China in Africa"	April 22, 2016	N/A
The plight of migrant workers in Dubai; examining the increasingly prominent business relationship between China and Africa.
47	11	"The Deal & City of Lost Children"	April 29, 2016	0.51
Exploring the recent Iran deal from both sides; tribes of homeless children live along the tracks in Kolkata, India.
48	12	"The End of Polio & Collateral Damage"	May 6, 2016	0.40
Health workers put their lives on the line in Pakistan to eradicate polio; examining the devastating effects of unexploded ordnance in Myanmar and Laos.
49	13	"State Of Surveillance"	May 27, 2016	N/A
Shane travels to Moscow to meet with Edward Snowden and discuss government surveillance programs.
50	14	"Heroin Crisis & New Age of Nukes"	June 3, 2016	N/A
At the center of the drug crisis in America is an explosion in heroin use; the U.S. government embarks on a large nuclear modernization effort.
51	15	"Flint Water Crisis & Libya on the Brink"	June 10, 2016	N/A
Examining the effects of the water crisis in Flint, Mich.; in Libya, rival militias fight to save the country.
52	16	"Die Trying"	June 17, 2016	N/A
Patients and top researchers across the U.S. discuss recent measures taken to tackle ALS; exploring the regulatory hurdles faced by ALS patients and drugmakers.
53	17	"Student Debt & Fecal Medicine"	June 24, 2016	N/A
The correlation between student-loan borrowing and the soaring cost of college tuition; a medical revolution involves using stool from a healthy person to treat severe intestinal infections in others.
54	18	"The New $pace Race & Closing Gitmo"	July 1, 2016	N/A
NASA and a growing community of private companies decide to prepare for Mars exploration; ex-detainees reveal what really happens behind the walls of the American prison at Guantanamo Bay, Cuba.

=== Season 5 (2017) ===
No. overall	No. in season	Title	Original release date	U.S. viewers (millions)
55	1	"Assad's Syria & Cost of Climate Change"	February 24, 2017	N/A
After six years of civil war, Bashar al-Assad, Syria's longtime dictator, is poised to re-take full control of his country; the economic stakes of denying climate change for decades.
56	2	"Trans Youth"	March 3, 2017	N/A
Families and doctors rewrite the rules as they decide when and how to start medical intervention before transgender youth hit puberty.
57	3	"When the Earth Melts & Displaced"	March 10, 2017	N/A
Correspondent Ben Anderson travels across the Arctic to examine the devastating impact of thawing permafrost and the astonishing solution that might keep it frozen; following the journey of refugees who hope to start new lives in Europe.
58	4	"Kings of Cannabis & Into the Darkness"	March 17, 2017	N/A
Two strain hunters scour the Democratic Republic of Congo searching for one of the rarest species of cannabis; nuclear physicist Taylor Wilson meets the scientists working to unlock the secrets of the Universe.
59	5	"Black and Blue & Our Bionic Future"	March 24, 2017	N/A
In St. Louis, activists and police officers talk about race and policing; recent advancements in bioengineering bring about scientific breakthroughs in rehabilitation for people with disabilities.
60	6	"End of Amateurism"	March 31, 2017	N/A
College athletics have seen explosive revenue growth in the last decade, but the NCAA requires players to forego profits in favor of scholarships and new facilities, and now federal courts are being asked whether that compensation is enough.
61	7	"Life Under Sharia & Plastic Oceans"	April 7, 2017	N/A
In the Indonesian province of Aceh, Sharia police enforce Islamic law; cleaning up the oceans and rethinking the ways of using plastic.
62	8	"Fast Food of Arabia & Nollywood"	April 21, 2017	N/A
The health effects of Kuwait's obsession with American fast food; exploring the booming film business in Nigeria.
63	9	"Medical Détente & Bananas"	April 28, 2017	N/A
The medical breakthroughs in Cuba that may soon be available in the U.S.; investigating the disease that could spell disaster for the worldwide banana trade.
64	10	"Taliban Resurgence"	May 5, 2017	N/A
The Taliban controls more territory than they did in 2001, but the war in Afghanistan does not get mentioned, in spite of a rising death count; questioning the accomplishments of the war.
65	11	"Engineering Immortality & Robot Revolution"	May 12, 2017	N/A
Looming breakthroughs in genomics, pharmaceuticals and stem cell research bring humanity to a second longevity explosion; robotics and the computers that power them are poised for a leap forward with the emergence of artificial intelligence.
66	12	"Women Behind Bars & The Business of Making Art"	May 19, 2017	N/A
Examining what it is like for American women who are in prison; Andy Warhol's work dramatically redefines the notion of art.
67	13	"Taking Back Iraq & Lost Generation"	June 2, 2017	N/A
Iraqi forces begin assault on the Islamic State's stronghold in the city of Mosul; examining the possible future of Iraq through the eyes of the country's youth.
68	14	"The Politics of Terror & End of the EU?"	June 9, 2017	N/A
In the wake of terror attacks and the migrant crisis, a new wave of populist candidates on the far right crops up across Europe; a look at former Italian prime minister Silvio Berlusconi and his role as Europe's original populist.
69	15	"Future of Firearms & Russia "Wins" Climate Change"	June 16, 2017	N/A
The future of firearms in America following the boom in firearms sales during the Obama administration; How climate change financially benefits Russia
70	16	"Cyber Supremacy & Japan Rising"	June 23, 2017	N/A
A look into Israel's new dominance in cyber security; Japan's rising nationalism threatens to change the pacifist nature of the country since WWII
71	17	"Last Line of Defense & El Rostro"	June 30, 2017	N/A
Public defenders face soaring caseloads and limited budgets; with 80 percent of all criminal defendants unable to afford a lawyer, the system is collapsing; in the Amazon, indigenous tribes strive to save their homes from exploitation.
72	18	"Power to the President"	July 14, 2017	N/A
Turkey prepares for a nationwide referendum that would grant President Recep Tayyip Erdogan unprecedented power in the wake of the government's forceful crackdown of more than 100,000 civil servants, teachers and journalists.
73	19	"Crude Reality & Between Oil and Water"	July 30, 2017	N/A
The failing of south Sudan, a country with enormous natural resource reserves, due to government corruption; The building of oil pipelines across native American reserves,
74	20	"Autism Under the Lens"	August 4, 2017	N/A
A look at the rise in diagnosis of autism, along with treatments currently being tested or in development, and a brief treatment of the issue of autistic rights and neurodiversity.
75	21	"Show of Force & Return to Somalia"	August 11, 2017	N/A
Journalists visit North Korea while tensions are rising following the DPRK's recent nuclear experiments; Following Somali citizens returning from the diaspora to their country in an attempt to strengthen their war-torn homeland.
76	22	"Controlling the Narrative & Power to Congo"	August 18, 2017	N/A
A look at the Philippines, the most dangerous place to be a journalist outside war zones; Ben Andersen returns to a park in the Congo that houses gorillas in danger of extinction, and sees how the local rangers are working to protect them.
77	23	"Dawn of A Dictator"	August 26, 2017	N/A
Two vice crews report from Venezuela, which is crumbling following an economic crisis caused by socialist and populist policies.
78	24	"Dirty Oil & Rebuilding Our Reefs"	September 8, 2017	N/A
A revisiting of Nigeria's illegal oil refineries after the end of 2016's amnesty program; Scientists are developing new ways to speed coral evolution to repair reefs damaged by increasing ocean temperatures.
79	25	"Dark Web & Future of Appalachia"	September 15, 2017	N/A
Expanded global internet access has led to a dramatic increase in child exploitation as new tools are developed to combat this trend; Coal mine closures and years of job losses cause one town to embrace technology to secure its future.
80	26	"Divide and Conquer & Crackdown in Honduras"	September 22, 2017	N/A
Examines the recent politics of Gerrymandering resulting from the RedMap initiative; Honduras implements U.S style prison reforms in its crackdown on violent gangs.
81	27	"Russian Hacking & Contagion"	September 29, 2017	N/A
An in-depth look at Russian hacking including a visit to a hacker conference and an interview with a black hat hacker; Looks at our current understanding of infectious disease outbreaks and our ability to predict and prevent a global pandemic.
82	28	"Post-Truth News and Microbiome"	October 6, 2017	N/A
Examining the impact of "Fake News" and what is and is not factual in a divided media landscape; A look at the possible health benefits of continued microbiome research stemming from fecal transplants to combat superbugs.
83	29	"After ISIS/Cubs of the Caliphate"	October 13, 2017	N/A
Ben Anderson is on the front lines during the final push to force ISIS out of Mosul in Iraq; Isobel Yeung interviews both child soldiers and children suffering from PTSD in the aftermath of ISIS.

=== Season 6 (2018) ===
No. overall	No. in season	Title	Original release date	U.S. viewers (millions)
84	1	"Raised in the system"	April 6, 2018	N/A
Actor Michael Kenneth Williams investigates the negative impacts of the American juvenile justice system.
85	2	"Battle for Jerusalem & A Face In The Crowd"	April 13, 2018	N/A
A look at the political future of Jerusalem; Examining the growing trend of facial recognition in mass surveillance of public spaces.
86	3	"A Revolution in Ruins & New Kids on the Blockchain"	April 20, 2018	N/A
An inside look at how the Libyan revolution is failing; a front-row seat to the geopolitical tug of war over Internet 3.0.
87	4	"The Parkland Effect"	April 27, 2018	N/A
Gianna Toboni sees firsthand how some teachers are taking up arms to be the "good guy with a gun that stops a bad guy with a gun" and explores the deep divisions in America that make it seem nearly impossible to stop these mass shootings.
88	5	"Massacre in Myanmar & The Blue Helmets"	May 4, 2018	N/A
Gianna Toboni travels to the Myanmar-Bangladesh border to investigate what the future holds for the world's most persecuted minority; correspondent Aris Roussinos joins U.N. peacekeepers on a peacekeeping operation across the lawless Sahara desert.
89	6	"Iran in Iraq & Dying on the Vine"	May 11, 2018	N/A
Isobel Yeung travels to Iraq to see how Iran is exerting its growing influence over the war-torn country ahead of parliamentary elections. Gianna Toboni heads to the vineyards of Napa during historic wildfires and the wine laboratories of Bordeaux to explore the dangers facing viticulture, and what they mean for agriculture everywhere.
90	7	"Russian Democracy & Global Gag Rule"	May 18, 2018	N/A
Ben Ferguson speaks with Russian voters and politicians to understand how democracy works in their country. Gianna Tobini examines how President Trump's Global Gag Rule impacts women's health in Uganda.
91	8	"Printing Tomorrow & Are We Alone?"	June 2, 2018	N/A
Krishna Andavolu delves into the cutting-edge world of 3D-printing, meeting the scientists and entrepreneurs pushing the boundaries of manufacturing, material science, and even space exploration. Scientists are closer than ever to finding life beyond Earth so VICE sent Nuclear physicist Taylor Wilson to explore one of our civilization's most haunting questions: Are we alone?
92	9	"No Choice But to Choose & Rebel Republic"	June 9, 2018	N/A
Gianna Toboni goes to Michigan to see school choice in action and understand what the future of public education might look like. Ben Anderson reports on the crisis in the Central African Republic, where the government barely controls the capital city, and 75% of the country is in the hands of at least 14 armed groups.
93	10	"The Cost of Living & Paradise Lost"	June 16, 2018	N/A
Investigating if a more democratized medicinal future is possible in America; citizens of Puerto Rico struggle to rebuild in the wake of Hurricane Maria, one of the worst natural disasters in the territory's history.
94	11	"Separated By Birth"	June 23, 2018	N/A
A look at the Trump administration family separation policy in action; The life of U.S. born immigrant children after deportation.
95	12	"The Big Fix & Silicon Valley of India"	June 30, 2018	N/A
The effects on the U.S. economy of its failing infrastructure; The rise of India's Silicon Valley.
96	13	"A Kurdish State & Out of Space"	July 6, 2018	N/A
The struggle for Kurdish independence in Iraq; The possible consequences of militarisation of space.
97	14	"Opioid Generation & Hindustan"	July 13, 2018	N/A
The effects of the U.S. opioid crisis on children; The rise of Hindu nationalism in India.
98	15	"After the Fall"	July 20, 2018	N/A
Life after ISIS in Syria.
99	16	"Waiting to Die & Women in War"	August 3, 2018	N/A
A look at the effect of difficulties for U.S. states to acquire lethal injection drugs; The state of gender equality in war torn Yemen.
100	17	"Trump's Trade War"	August 10, 2018	N/A
The domestic impacts of Trump's trade wars.
101	18	"A New Leaf & Quantum Supremacy"	August 17, 2018	N/A
The struggle for a cocaine-free Colombia; Building the first quantum computer.
102	19	"Trans In Texas & Nicaragua Deja Vu"	August 24, 2018	N/A
Gianna Toboni returns to Texas to see how the transgender community is fighting to win acceptance and protection. Vikram Gandhi travels to Nicaragua to meet the new revolutionaries seeking to oust President Daniel Ortega and find out what the future may hold.
103	20	"American Piety & Terror in Congo"	September 7, 2018	N/A
Gianna Toboni travels to America's Bible Belt to see how evangelicals are navigating today's volatile political environment. Ben Anderson reports on the Allied Democratic Forces and their actions inside the Democratic Republic of the Congo.
104	21	"Engineering Earth"	September 14, 2018	N/A
As greenhouse gas emissions continue to rise at unprecedented levels, scientists work to develop a backup plan to use technology to "geoengineer" the Earth's atmosphere and reduce the effects of climate change.
105	22	"Brainhackers & Fall of Rio"	September 21, 2018	N/A
Thomas Morton reports on advances in neurotechnology that could open up new avenues of human experience. Ben Anderson returns to Rio de Janeiro to check on social, economic and political conditions since Brazil hosted the 2016 Olympics and 2014 World Cup.
106	23	"Consent"	September 28, 2018	N/A
One year after the explosive allegations against Harvey Weinstein, the #MeToo movement has impacted everything from Supreme Court nominees and workplace culture to sex and dating. Isobel Yeung takes a searing, personal look at how we define consent, hold assailants accountable and start to move forward.
107	24	"Voodoo Wrestling & Big Placebo"	October 5, 2018	N/A
Dexter Thomas visits the Democratic Republic of the Congo to explore the sport of catch fétiche and the emergence of women as its new champions. Charlet Duboc reports on alternative medicine in the U.S. and the country's wellness obsession.
108	25	"Death Inc. & Bannon's World"	November 9, 2018	N/A
Gianna Toboni travels to Mexico to investigate the roots of a spiraling murder rate and meets the people who refuse to be silenced. Michael Moynihan visits Sweden, Italy and Belgium to follow former Trump strategist Steve Bannon and witness the rise of Europe's right-wing populist movement.
109	26	"The Road to Asylum & Lab Rat Nation"	November 16, 2018	N/A
Krishna Andavolu reports from Central America and the southern U.S. border on the effects of Trump administration policies on thousands of asylum seekers. Vikram Gandhi interviews people who were paid by pharmaceutical companies to try drugs not yet approved by the FDA and report their side effects.
110	27	"A Living Hell & MDMA for PTSD"	November 23, 2018	N/A
Ben Anderson returns to Yemen to witness the devastating effects of four years of war and indiscriminate bombing of civilians. Anderson investigates trials using MDMA-assisted therapy for veterans and first responders suffering from PTSD.
111	28	"The War at Home & Putin's Crimea"	November 30, 2018	N/A
Gianna Toboni reports on domestic violence in the U.S. and meets women working to fix the shortcomings of a legal system that often fails to protect them. Isobel Yeung investigates how Crimeans are faring under Russian control, and how Ukrainians are clinging to the hope of reunification.
112	29	"Doom Boom & Unfair"	December 7, 2018	N/A
Exploring the U.S.'s booming doomsday industry; the cultural bias towards lighter skin in India.
113	30	"Back in the DPRK & California Burning"	December 14, 2018	N/A
Revisiting the Korean peninsula in the wake of the new detente; the state of California's future in the wake of increasingly deadly fires.

=== Season 7 (2020) ===
No. overall	No. in season	Title	Original release date	U.S. viewers (millions)
114	1	"Keepers of the Caliphate & SIM Kids"	March 29, 2020	N/A
Hind Hassan explores the resurgence of ISIS, as brigades of radicalized ISIS women have started to regroup within al-Hol camp, where tens of thousands of women and children who once lived under The Islamic State and are now held; Krishna Andavolu examines the unlikely origins of what some call the perfect crime, and explores the urgent implications for personal security, digital identity, and the persistent industry inaction on SIM swapping.
115	2	"India Burning & Russia's Fight Factory"	April 5, 2020	N/A
With India's leaders ramping up Hindu nationalist rhetoric, Isobel Yeung investigates the growing fear that the nation's 200 million Muslims are being systematically targeted; Alzo Slade heads to Dagestan to explore how this tiny Russian republic with a turbulent history became a modern day fight factory, producing some of the world's top wrestlers and MMA fighters.
116	3	"Battle for Idlib & Seeking Solitude"	April 12, 2020	N/A
Isobel Yeung gains rare access inside Idlib, Syria's last rebel-held territory, as President Assad and his allies mount a brutal bombing offensive that has civilians paying the highest price; Dexter Thomas goes on lockdown in South Korea to search for the benefits of isolation, prior to massive outbreaks of COVID-19 around the world.
117	4	"Warning from Wuhan & Cuban Hostage Crisis"	April 19, 2020	N/A
Krishna Andavolu presents the video diary of Chinese citizen journalist Chen Qiushi to illustrate the full impact of COVID-19 in Wuhan; Paola Ramos exposes how the Trump Administration's "Remain in Mexico" policy is strengthening cartels as they kidnap Cuban migrants held at the border and target their American families waiting for them at home.
118	5	"Quitting WeWork & Losing Ground & Italy's Darkest Hour"	April 26, 2020	N/A
In this 1-hour episode, Seb Walker examines the spectacular rise and fall of WeWork, and delves into the world of venture capitalists willing to gamble billions on the next big startup; as the U.S. continues to grapple with its history of racial discrimination, Alzo Slade explores the vulnerability of black land owners in the South; Isobel Yeung reports from the heart of Italy's COVID-19 crisis, gaining rare access to an ICU in a hospital overwhelmed by the virus.
119	6	"Three Borders, One War & Generation TikTok"	May 3, 2020	N/A
David Noriega reports from the border between Brazil, Paraguay, and Argentina, a lawless place where criminal gangs are more powerful than nation-states; TikTok is one of the most popular apps -- but it's not exactly the first place someone runs to when they want to find thoughtful, deliberate dialogue. Dexter Thomas examines how that's changing.
120	7	"Fighting COVID and Atomic Atolls"	May 10, 2020	N/A
Gianna Toboni follows front line healthcare workers as they take on the unprecedented COVID-19 crisis; Ben Anderson explores the nuclear legacy of the United States' atomic weapons testing in the Marshall Islands and the negative impacts on its people.
121	8	"Terror in the Sahel & Corona Crash"	May 17, 2020	N/A
Ben Anderson goes to Burkina Faso, where one of Africa's fastest growing humanitarian crises spins out of control as the Sahel becomes the new epicenter of terrorism and violence; Michael Moynihan surveys the long-term economic devastation wrought by COVID-19 and asks if our cure is causing another disease.
122	9	"Maximum Pressure & The Unreachables"	May 24, 2020	N/A
Iran has experienced one of the world's worst COVID-19 outbreaks. VICE founder Suroosh Alvi takes an in-depth look at the role of sanctions and mismanagement in the country's fate, including an exclusive interview with former Iranian President Mahmoud Ahmadinejad; Two years after the controversial migrant family-separation crisis sparked nationwide outrage, correspondent Antonia Hylton follows the ACLU as they work across borders to reunite families who were torn apart.
123	10	"Death At Parchman & Undocumented"	May 31, 2020	N/A
Gianna Toboni examines how Mississippi's Department of Corrections neglected Parchman Prison for years until recent riots and smuggled out images exposed its grim and deadly conditions; Paola Ramos explores what it's like to survive as an undocumented immigrant in the midst of the COVID-19 outbreak.
124	11	"Viral Racism & Spring Break Forever"	June 7, 2020	N/A
Isobel Yeung explores racism incidents in the coronavirus pandemic; Alzo Slade visits Florida during the Spring Break season to see how local officials are handling the pandemic.
125	12	"Citizen's Unrest & Brazil's "Little Flu" & Know Your Enemy"	June 14, 2020	N/A
126	13	"Crackdown in Cambodia & The Last Responders"	June 21, 2020	N/A
Hind Hassan travels to Cambodia to find out how the COVID-19 pandemic is being used as a cover for political repression by one of the world's longest-serving leaders. Seb Walker follows New York City's so-called "Last Responders" as they battle against a pandemic to maintain dignity for the dead.

=== Season 8 (2021) ===
No. overall	No. in season	Title	Original release date	U.S. viewers (millions)
127	1	"Talibanistan & Armed and Black"	March 7, 2021	N/A
What the future of Afghanistan may hold now that American troops are leaving after more than 19 years of war; Major players helping to arm and train Black Americans with guns and why arming up as a Black person can carry deadly risks.
128	2	"Nigerian Uprising & The Brink"	March 14, 2021	N/A
Alzo Slade meets the young Nigerians at the center of #EndSARS, and those involved in the deadly crackdown against them; Seb Walker sits with Trump's Acting Secretary of Defense Chris Miller to discuss his controversial days in office.
129	3	"Evicted & Haiti's New Strongman"	March 21, 2021	N/A
Jason Motlagh travels to Haiti to uncover the relationship between the government of the US-backed President, a local gang leader, and the recent violence; Ben Solomon meets those pulled into homelessness during the pandemic.
130	4	"El Darién & Out of Sight"	March 28, 2021	N/A
As thousands of migrants make their way toward the United States, many face a grueling 60-mile hike along the Columbia-Panama border through one of the world's most dangerous jungles. Paola Ramos travels to El Darién to meet with migrants facing robbery, rape and death on the road north; The police-worn body camera is a potent weapon against police brutality, but while sales have skyrocketed, it has yet to fulfill its promise as a silver bullet. Krishna Andavolu investigates body camera functionality, usage, legislation and impact.
131	5	"Egypt's Silent War & Chain of Command"	April 4, 2021	N/A
Human rights abuses in Egypt; violence and impunity on US military bases.
132	6	"Hong Kong's Resistance & Prison Profiteers"	April 11, 2021	N/A
Laurel Chor reports from inside Hong Kong and meets those who are risking their lives to maintain the freedoms that Beijing is targeting; David Noriega investigates how the private prison industry pushes back against its critics to protect profits.
133	7	"Yemen's War Kids & Joint Custody"	April 18, 2021	N/A
Isobel Yeung gains rare access to the frontlines of Marib and explores how the escalation in Yemen's conflict is impacting its most vulnerable citizens— children; Krishna Andavolu reports on how parents across the country who use pot can face losing custody of their kids even in states where it has been legalized.
134	8	"Shadow War & God And Country"	April 25, 2021	N/A
With unprecedented access in Iran and Iraq, Suroosh Alvi investigates a sprawling shadow war for the heart of the Middle East; Alzo Slade travels through the Bible Belt to see how the evangelical community grapples with a post-Trump world.
135	9	"Cancer Alley & Cuba's New Revolution"	November 14, 2021	N/A
Alzo Slade travels to "Cancer Alley", an 85-mile stretch in Louisiana where nearly 150 petrochemical plants and oil refineries line the Mississippi river; Paola Ramos travels to Cuba to find out if the Communist dictatorship is losing grip.
136	10	"Land of the Free & Ethiopia's War Within"	November 21, 2021	N/A
Vegas Tenold travels to "American Redoubt", a conservative enclave in Northern Idaho that has burgeoned in the wake of the 2020 election; Julia Steers reports on Ethiopia's ongoing civil war, where PM Ahmed Abiy has been accused of ethnic cleansing.
137	11	"The Taliban's Terror Problem & Citizen's Arrest"	November 28, 2021	N/A
Isobel Yeung travels to Afghanistan to explore the security challenges for the new Taliban regime; Alexis Johnson looks at dark the history of citizen's arrest laws, which the three men charged with Ahmaud Arbery's murder are using as their defense.
138	12	"State of Surveillance & Killing Dissent"	December 5, 2021	N/A
Krishna Andavolu dives into how Big Tech's investment in 'big brother' has allowed a surveillance state to slowly creep into American domestic policy; Ben C. Solomon investigates the poets of Myanmar and their push to rally protests against the military takeover even as they become targeted for death.
139	13	"Descent into Darkness & Merging With Machines"	December 12, 2021	N/A
Matthew Cassel travels to Lebanon to examine the anatomy of a failed state — from sectarian violence to economic collapse — and the impact of that failure on ordinary people and the region; Alice Hines meets cyborgs, neuroscientists and tech pioneers to explore the rapidly blurring line between biology and technology and what it all means for humanity 2.0.
140	14	"Take Down the CCP & World's Coolest Dictator"	December 19, 2021	N/A
Guo Wengui was one of China's richest real estate moguls until he found himself facing corruption charges. He fled the mainland and later reappeared on American soil. Isobel Yeung meets Wengui and explores his web of disinformation spreading throughout the US; El Salvador's president, Nayib Bukele, owes his popularity to a decline in gang violence. But true to Bukele's persona, the achievement appears to be all public relations. David Noriega travels to El Salvador to find the truth behind the supposed achievements of its millennial president.
141	15	"But I Read It Online & No Safe Haven"	December 26, 2021	N/A
Alzo Slade explores how medical disinformation has proliferated and been politicized under the guise of "alternative health" during the COVID-19 pandemic; Hind Hassan travels to the frontiers of Turkey and Europe, documenting a new migrant crisis and witnessing Greece's abuse of international law as part of Europe's response to the humanitarian crisis they helped create.

=== Season 9 (2022) ===
No. overall	No. in season	Title	Original release date	U.S. viewers (millions)
142	1	"Putin's Playbook & United States of Vigilantes"	May 1, 2022	N/A
Hind Hassan reports on the Russian invasion of Ukraine from Kharkiv, one of the cities worst-affected by Putin's tactic of brutal and indiscriminate bombing; Paola Ramos travels the United States to understand how a new political tool is altering democracy. Season premiere.
143	2	"Russian Mercenaries & Treat, Release, Repeat"	May 8, 2022	N/A
Julia Steers gives viewers an unprecedented look at the global operations of the Kremlin-backed private military force, Wagner Group, as its reach spreads from Ukraine to Central Africa; Seb Walker examines the implications of shuttering state psychiatric hospitals and talks to those on the front lines of America's mental health crisis, some of whom are asking whether it's time to revisit and rethink the concept of asylums.
144	3	"Freeing Brittney Griner & Conservative Utopia"	May 15, 2022	N/A
Alexis Johnson takes a look at the potential fate of WNBA star Brittney Griner, one of the last Americans in Russian prison at the onset of a possible new Cold War; Matthew Cassel travels to Budapest during Viktor Orban's reelection to explore why so many right-wing Americans are traveling to Hungary, and what they hope to learn from Central Europe's most autocratic ruler.
145	4	"The Price of Oil & Chasing Ghosts"	May 29, 2022	N/A
Hind Hassan travels to Somaliland to investigate the shadowy supply chain for frankincense, one of the world's oldest traded commodities used in the growing market for essential oils; Keegan Hamilton investigates the rise of "ghost guns," homemade firearms built from parts without serial numbers that are proliferating in the United States despite efforts to crack down.
146	5	"Hack Back & This Is Not Your Land"	June 5, 2022	N/A
Ben Ferguson gets an inside look at the cyberwar between Ukraine and Russia, and how it's changing the rules of war in real time; David Noriega visits Oklahoma to see the aftermath of a Supreme Court decision that returned half the state to five Native American Nations.
147	6	"Post-Roe America & Ready Player Earn"	June 12, 2022	N/A
Gianna Toboni meets with politicians, abortion providers and women to understand how drastically the country could change in a post-Roe world; Krishna Andavolu travels to the Philippines to learn more about the play-to-earn gaming phenomenon that has taken the country by storm, and which critics claim resembles a Ponzi scheme.
148	7	"Guyana for Sale & Moors Rising"	June 19, 2022	N/A
Isobel Yeung goes undercover in Guyana to investigate corruption in large-scale development projects, as the small South American country becomes an attractive target for investment from China; Alzo Slade meets with Moors in America to learn more about their origin story, heritage and ultimately, why the current social and political landscape is making Moorish Nationalism more appealing.
149	8	"The Russian Bubble & After the Siege"	June 26, 2022	N/A
Alec Luhn reports from Moscow and Dagestan on how propaganda has convinced a majority of Russians to support Putin's bloody and costly invasion of Ukraine; Ben C. Solomon travels to Kharkiv and Donbas to explore how the frontline has evolved since the start of the war in Ukraine.
150	9	"Addiction in Afghanistan & Blurred Blue Line"	July 31, 2022	N/A
Isobel Yeung is in Afghanistan, exploring the Taliban's ban on drugs – and the issues with addiction; Vegas Tenold heads to the Midwest to see whether police officers can actually be trained to intervene in cases of police misconduct.
151	10	"Smugglers of the Caribbean & Felony Murder"	August 7, 2022	N/A
Dexter Thomas Jr. travels to Alabama to learn about the Felony Murder rule and speaks to those most affected by it; As the surge of migrants at sea continues, Paola Ramos meets a smuggler trafficking people into the U.S. by boat.
152	11	"Killing for Success & Marcos Returns"	August 14, 2022	N/A
Alzo Slade investigates the intersection of music and violence in Drill music, the most popular subgenre of rap today; Natashya Gutierrez travels to the Philippines to dig into the historic comeback of the Marcos family to the country's highest office, 36 years after dictator Ferdinand Marcos Sr. was ousted by the People Power revolution.
153	12	"Sri Lanka Revolts & God Save Brazil"	August 21, 2022	N/A
Isobel Yeung goes to Brazil's Javari Valley, where evangelical missionaries and indigenous tribes are battling over the soul of the Amazon – and the future of Brazil; Matthew Cassel reports on the financial collapse that united Sri Lankans against the country's ruling dynasty.
154	13	"The Replaced & The Missing"	August 28, 2022	N/A
Vegas Tenold takes us to the heart of far-right America to understand the enduring power of the Great Replacement Theory, and its lethality; Paola Ramos travels to Mexico to meet with mothers searching for their missing daughters in a country plagued by violent crime, human trafficking and government impunity.
155	14	"Taiwan Under Threat & False Positive"	September 11, 2022	N/A
Alice Hines investigates how inaccurate drug tests could be determining hundreds of thousands of court cases and upending the lives of people around the country; Melissa Chan travels to Taiwan to find out how residents on the island are preparing against mounting threats of an invasion by China.
156	15	"Uncensored & Battle For Africa"	September 18, 2022	N/A
Hanako Montgomery explores why Japan hasn't moved to ban sexual depictions of children in manga, despite international and domestic pressure to outlaw the comics; Suroosh Alvi visits an epic show of American force in Morocco, the frontline of a political battle in Guinea, and a retail supercenter in suburban Georgia to find out if US-Russian rivalry is linked to the unrest in Africa.
157	16	"Isis Jail Break & Right Wing Stars"	September 18, 2022	N/A
Hind Hassan travels to Syria to find out how a resurgent Islamic State nearly managed to free thousands of its imprisoned militants from under the nose of the Syrian Democratic Forces – one of America's closest allies in the fight against ISIS; Gianna Toboni meets young conservatives to see how their ideology is changing, and what it takes to become a right wing star in the U.S. today. Season finale.

=== Season 10 (2023) ===
No. overall	No. in season	Title	Original release date	U.S. viewers (millions)
158	1	"Syrian aftershock & Almost intelligent"	May 7, 2023	N/A
Season premiere. Hind Hassan travels to northwest Syria to investigate a recent devastating earthquake and what prevented critical humanitarian aid from getting to survivors in the region who needed it the most; Krishna Andavolu reports on rapid developments in artificial intelligence and learns why many in the tech industry worry that time is running out to uncover how these new AI systems really work - before they become too powerful to control.
159	2	"Lynching For God & Backgrounded"	May 14, 2023	N/A
Isobel Young meets with religious hardliners in Pakistan, where insulting The Prophet is constitutionally punishable by death, and reports on how they encourage the extrajudicial killing of blasphemers without mercy; Alzo Slade explores the systemic issues behind housing inequality, from landlord concerns over the safety of their renters to how an unregulated background check industry can complicate housing access for formerly incarcerated people.
160	3	"The State of Israel & The Other Drug Crisis"	May 21, 2023	N/A
Matthew Cassel covers Israeli Prime Minister Benjamin Netanyahu's return to power by partnering with far-right political parties and their historic and controversial attempt to overhaul the Israeli Supreme Court. Paola Ramos travels from drug labs in Mexico to Oregon, the state with the highest percentage of meth addiction in the U.S., to understand how the cartels' newest, cheapest and most potent form of meth, known as "Supermeth", is fueling an overwhelming national mental health crisis.
161	4	"Detransitioners & Draining the DRC"	June 4, 2023	N/A
Alyza Enriques unpacks the role of detransitioners, or formerly transgender people who have stopped medical treatment, in legislative efforts across the country to ban gender-affirming care, as well as those who oppose these polarizing bans. Alzo Slade travels to the Democratic Republic of Congo, which sits on top of more than half the world's known cobalt supply, to investigate the country's dangerous, yet highly profitable mining industry.
162	5	"Lone Star Justice & The Cost of War"	June 11, 2023	N/A
Paola Ramos travels to Texas to see how Republican Governor Greg Abbott's border enforcement initiative, Operation Lone Star, is potentially circumventing the federal government's authority over immigration. One year after Russia's invasion of Ukraine and an estimated 300,000 casualties, Ben C. Solomon treks to the war-torn frontlines to reveal the grim reality of the ongoing conflict.
163	6	"Catfished by Captives & The Disappeared"	June 18, 2023	N/A
Natashya Gutierrez travels to Southeast Asia to explore a dark new form of online scamming, known as "pig butchering", that is involuntarily perpetuated by victims of human trafficking forced to steal for the Chinese mafia who run these manipulative scams. David Noriega investigates the deaths and disappearances of Moroccan migrants as they attempt to cross the Spanish border at Melilla and examines how outsourced European immigration policies may ultimately be responsible for these tragedies.
164	7	"Charged With Terror & Ukraine's Stolen Children"	June 25, 2023	N/A
Vegas Tenold examines how new domestic terrorism laws in Georgia have alarmed some civil rights groups who worry that these efforts to combat homegrown extremism may infringe on the rights to free speech and assembly. Isobel Young investigates accusations that the Russian government is systematically deporting thousands of children from occupied areas of Ukraine, an illegal act that could be one of the most egregious war crimes of Russia's invasion so far.

== Cancelled episode ==
Title	Scheduled air date
"The Gitmo Candidate & Chipping Away"	May 28, 2023
Seb Walker investigates claims that Florida Governor and presidential hopeful, Ron DeSantis, witnessed torture at Guantanamo Bay during one of the most brutal years in the prison's history. Isobel Young covers the high-stakes technological race between the U.S. and China over the production of semiconductors.

== Specials ==
Title	Original release date	U.S. viewers (millions)
"Vice Special Report: Killing Cancer"	February 27, 2015	N/A
Shane explores how common diseases are being used to fight cancer.
"Vice Special Report: Fixing the System"	September 27, 2015	0.51
The impact of America's approach to crime and imprisonment. President Obama tours a federal correctional institution in Oklahoma.
"Vice Special Report: Countdown to Zero"	December 1, 2015	N/A
Examining the search for a cure and a preventative vaccine that could eliminate AIDS.
"Vice Special Report: Fighting ISIS"	January 31, 2016	N/A
Journalist Ben Anderson gains access to three front lines in Iraq, where Sunni, Shiite and Kurdish forces are battling the Islamic State.
"Vice Special Report: A House Divided"	December 9, 2016	N/A
Examining some of the most divisive issues of Barack Obama's presidency and how these issues contributed to a political climate that gave rise to the election of a non-politician, Donald Trump.
"Vice Special Report: A World in Disarray"	July 21, 2017	N/A
Examining the past, present, and future of American foreign policy.
"Vice Special Report: The future of work"	April 20, 2019	N/A
The sometimes surprising consequences on employment of automation and artificial intelligence.
"Vice Special Report: Panic, the untold story of the 2008 financial crisis"	April 21, 2019	N/A
Retrospective interviews with key players of the 2008 financial crisis.
