= First wave =

First wave may refer to:

- First-wave feminism, a period of feminist history during the late 19th and early 20th centuries
- First European colonization wave, from the early 15th century to the early 19th century
- First Wave (TV series), a Sci-Fi Channel series that aired from 1998 to 2001
- First Wave (comics), a comic book limited series by DC Comics
- "First Wave", an episode of the TV series Total Recall 2070
- 1st Wave (Sirius XM), a classic alternative rock radio station on Sirius XM Satellite Radio channel 33
- The First Wave, Big Finish Productions audiobook
- The First Wave (film), a 2021 documentary film
- First Wave Entertainment, a motion picture film production company
