= Vice (TV series) =

Documentary television series

- Title card from seasons 1–3
- Genre: Documentary
- Created by: Shane Smith
- Based on: Vice Media
- Starring: Shane Smith, Gideon Yago, Thomas Morton, Jake Hanrahan, Isobel Yeung, Ben Anderson
- Theme music composer: Nick Zinner, Ben Vida & Hisham Bharoocha
- Opening theme: Doomed
- Country of origin: United States
- Original language: English
- No. of seasons: 10
- No. of episodes: 164 (list of episodes)

Production
- Executive producers: Bill Maher (seasons 1–6); Shane Smith; Suroosh Alvi; Fareed Zakaria; Eddy Moretti; BJ Levin (seasons 1–4); Tim Clancy (season 4–10); Beverly Chase; Craig Thompson; Subrata De
- Production locations: Syria, Afghanistan, North Korea, Iraq, Nigeria, Ukraine, Venezuela, Brazil, Myanmar, Mexico, South Sudan, Los Angeles, New York (HQ)
- Editor: Danny Gabai
- Running time: 27–43 minutes
- Production companies: Bill Maher Productions (seasons 1–6); Vice Original Series; HBO Entertainment (seasons 1–6); Showtime Networks (seasons 7–10)
- Budget: $13.2 million

Original release
- Network: HBO (seasons 1–6); Showtime (season 7–10)
- Release: April 5, 2013 – June 25, 2023

Vice (stylised as VICE) is a documentary television series created and hosted by Shane Smith of Vice magazine. It covers topics using an immersionist style of documentary filmmaking on Showtime. It premiered on April 5, 2013, on HBO. The show's second season aired in 2014 and won an Emmy Award for Outstanding Informational Series or Special.

The show originally was executive-produced by Bill Maher, Shane Smith, and Eddy Moretti, and CNN journalist Fareed Zakaria was credited as a consultant. On May 7, 2014, HBO renewed the series for two more seasons. The 14-episode third season began March 6, 2015, one week after the hour-long "Killing Cancer" aired on February 27. Vice's sixth season aired on April 6, 2018. On March 25, 2015, HBO announced Vice's renewal through Season 7.

The show's cancellation was announced on February 1, 2019, making the sixth season its last season on HBO. However, on September 24, the series was picked up by Showtime and resumed on March 29, 2020. On July 30, 2020, the series was renewed for an eighth season that premiered on March 7, 2021. On February 7, 2022, the series was renewed by for its ninth and tenth season. In July 2023, the series was removed from the Showtime streaming app, with Vice News shopping it to other outlets.

== Synopsis ==
The show follows Vice journalists and founders, Shane Smith and Suroosh Alvi with segment hosts Ryan Duffy and Thomas Morton as they went to different parts of the world. They interviewed people on political and cultural topics. Subjects included political assassinations, young weapons manufacturers, child suicide bombers, Indian and Pakistani border politics, the Chinese one-child policy, climate change, and bonded laborers in Pakistan's brick kilns, featuring the work of human and labor rights activist Syeda Ghulam Fatima.

== Correspondents ==
- Suroosh Alvi
- Krishna Andavolu
- Ben Anderson
- Matthew Cassel
- Vikram Gandhi (2013–2016)
- Hind Hassan
- Kaj Larsen (2015–2016)
- Thomas Morton (2014–2019)
- David Noriega
- Simon Ostrovsky (2011–2014)
- Paola Ramos
- Ahmed Shihab-Eldin (2016)
- Alzo Slade
- Julia Steers
- Ben C. Solomon
- Vegas Tenold
- Gianna Toboni
- Aris Roussinos (2013–2017)
- Seb Walker
- Taylor Wilson (2016–2018)
- Isobel Yeung

== Release ==
The first episode aired on HBO on April 5, 2013, and was available for free via YouTube. The series is the first televised program for VICE, featuring Vice staff as correspondents. Politics, culture, and drugs are the main focuses of the Vice series.

== Reception ==
=== Critical response ===
The show has received both positive and negative reviews because of its unique, provocative presentation and style. Some compare it to a gonzo type of journalism. Maureen Ryan of The Huffington Post wrote a negative review of the show, due to its presentation. Rolling Stone magazine has written that: "It feels a little like your buddy from the bar just happened to be wandering through eastern Afghanistan with a camera crew." In June 2013, the show was covered extensively in mainstream media for documenting a basketball game with North Korean dictator Kim Jong-un. Vice correspondents have filmed from the inside of crack-cooking kitchens in Atlanta to Haitian secret societies in talk of zombie powder.

== Vice News Tonight ==
Vice News Tonight is a nightly news program that debuted on October 10, 2016, on HBO, marking a significant expansion of Vice Media's news coverage. This spin-off was designed to offer a more concentrated news format, focusing on delivering updates and analysis of current events. The program featured a mix of hard news, investigative pieces, and special reports. In 2020, Vice News Tonight underwent a relaunch and was reintroduced on the Vice cable network. This transition was part of Vice Media’s strategy to adapt to changing media consumption trends and maintain its presence in the competitive news landscape. The shift from HBO to the Vice cable network represented a strategic move to leverage Vice Media’s existing resources and audience reach. The program retained its core focus on in-depth reporting and investigative journalism, now with an updated format to fit the new platform.

== Series overview ==
Season	Episodes	Originally released		
Season	Episodes	First released	Last released	Network
1	10	April 5, 2013	June 14, 2013	HBO
2	12	March 14, 2014	June 13, 2014	HBO
3	14	March 6, 2015	June 26, 2015	HBO
4	18	February 5, 2016	July 1, 2016	HBO
5	29	February 24, 2017	October 13, 2017	HBO
6	30	April 6, 2018	December 14, 2018	HBO
7	13	March 29, 2020	June 21, 2020	Showtime
8	15	March 7, 2021	December 26, 2021	Showtime
9	16	May 1, 2022	September 18, 2022	Showtime
10	7	May 7, 2023	June 25, 2023	Showtime

== Pulled episode ==
It was reported in June 2023 that Showtime pulled an episode of the series originally scheduled to air on May 28, 2023. The episode, "The Gitmo Candidate & Chipping Away", was scheduled to air four days after Ron DeSantis officially announced he was entering the 2024 Presidential race. In the scrubbed promo for the episode, it described Seb Walker investigating claims that DeSantis witnessed acts condemned by the United Nations as torture during his time as a JAG officer in the Navy at Guantanamo Bay.

== See also ==
- The Vice Guide to Travel (2006)
- Rule Britannia (2009)
- Vice News Tonight (2016)
- HBO (1972)
