= The Forever Prisoner =

- Release poster
- Directed by: Alex Gibney
- Produced by: Erin Edeiken; Cathy Scott Clark; Alex Gibney; Raymond Bonner
- Cinematography: Ben Bloodwell; Antonio Rossi
- Edited by: Alexis Johnson
- Music by: Will Bates
- Production companies: Jigsaw Productions; HBO Documentary Films
- Distributed by: HBO
- Release date: December 6, 2021 (United States)
- Running time: 119 minutes
- Country: United States
- Language: English

The Forever Prisoner is a 2021 documentary film directed by Alex Gibney.

== Synopsis ==
The film details the treatment of Abu Zubaydah, a Palestinian detainee held at CIA blacksites and later Guantanamo Bay.

== Reception ==
=== Critical response ===
On the review aggregator website Rotten Tomatoes, 80% of 5 critics' reviews are positive, with an average rating of 8.4/10.

=== Accolades ===
The Forever Prisoner won the News and Documentary Emmy Award for Outstanding Investigative Documentary at the 43rd News and Documentary Emmy Awards in 2022.
