= The First Wave (film) =

2021 American documentary film by Matthew Heineman

- Theatrical release poster
- Directed by: Matthew Heineman
- Produced by: Matthew Heineman; Jenna Millman; Leslie Norville
- Cinematography: Matthew Heineman; Ross McDonnell; Thorsten Thielow; Brian Dawson; Alex Pritz
- Edited by: Francisco Bello; Matthew Heineman; Gabriel Rhodes; David Zieff
- Music by: H. Scott Salinas; Jon Batiste
- Production companies: National Geographic Documentary Films; Participant; Our Time Projects
- Distributed by: Neon
- Release dates: October 7, 2021 (HFF); November 19, 2021
- Running time: 93 minutes
- Country: United States
- Language: English
- Box office: $62,376

The First Wave is a 2021 American documentary film, directed and produced by Matthew Heineman. The film follows a hospital in New York City, as it battles the COVID-19 pandemic. Alex Gibney serves as an executive producer.

It had its world premiere at the Hamptons Film Festival on October 7, 2021. It released on November 19, 2021, by Neon.

== Synopsis ==
The film follows a hospital in New York City from March to June 2020 as it battles the COVID-19 pandemic. The film examines structural factors that influenced the initial COVID outbreak and how such factors impact American society more broadly.

== Production ==
In April 2020, it was announced Heineman would direct a documentary film revolving around the COVID-19 pandemic, focusing on health care workers with Alex Gibney set to serve as an executive producer.

Matthew Heineman reached out to a source from his previous film Escape Fire: The Fight to Rescue American Healthcare, to explore access opportunities at different medical facilities in New York, with Long Island Jewish Medical Center allowing Heineman and his crew to film. Donning the same personal protective equipment as hospital staff, two-person teams deployed to chronicle unfolding events. No crew members contracted the virus during production.

== Release ==
In March 2021, Neon and National Geographic Documentary Films acquired distribution rights to the film. It had its world premiere at the Hamptons International Film Festival on October 7, 2021. It also screened at the Busan International Film Festival and BFI London Film Festival on October 9, 2021. It will also screen at AFI Fest in November 2021. It released in the United States on November 19, 2021. and in the United Kingdom on November 26, 2021, by Dogwoof.

== Reception ==
=== Critical reception ===
On the review aggregator website Rotten Tomatoes, the film holds an approval rating of 96% based on 27 reviews, with an average rating of 7.9/10. The website's consensus reads "The First Wave presents a starkly gripping snapshot of a crisis unfolding -- and its grim toll on those who put their lives on the line to fight it". On Metacritic, the film has a weighted average score of 85 out of 100, based on 11 critics, indicating "universal acclaim".

=== Accolades ===
Award	Date	Category	Recipient	Result	Ref.
Philadelphia Film Festival	November 4, 2021	Best Documentary Feature	The First Wave	Won	
Critics' Choice Documentary Awards	November 14, 2021	Best Science/Nature Documentary	The First Wave	Nominated	
Critics' Choice Documentary Awards	November 14, 2021	Best Editing	Francisco Bello, Matthew Heineman, Gabriel Rhodes, and David Zieff	Nominated	
Hollywood Music in Media Awards	November 17, 2021	Song – Documentary Film	Jon Batiste (for the song "Breathe")	Nominated	
Washington D.C. Area Film Critics Association	December 6, 2021	Best Documentary	The First Wave	Nominated	
Cinema Eye Honors	March 1, 2022	Outstanding Production	Matthew Heineman, Jenna Millman, and Leslie Norville	Won	
International Documentary Association	March 4, 2022	Pare Lorentz Award	Matthew Heineman, Jenna Millman, and Leslie Norville	Won	
International Documentary Association	March 4, 2022	Best Cinematography	Ross McDonnell, Thorsten Thielow, Brian Dawson, Matthew Heineman, and Alex Pritz	Nominated	
Producers Guild of America Awards	March 19, 2022	Outstanding Producer of Documentary Motion Pictures	The First Wave	Nominated	
News and Documentary Emmy Awards	September 29, 2022	Best Documentary	The First Wave	Won	
News and Documentary Emmy Awards	September 29, 2022	Outstanding Cinematography: Documentary	Brian Dawson, Matthew Heineman, Ross McDonnell, Alex Pritz, and Thorsten Thielow	Won	
News and Documentary Emmy Awards	September 29, 2022	Outstanding Direction: Documentary	Matthew Heineman	Nominated	
News and Documentary Emmy Awards	September 29, 2022	Outstanding Editing: Documentary	Francisco Bello, Matthew Heineman, Gabriel Rhodes, and David Zieff	Won	
News and Documentary Emmy Awards	September 29, 2022	Outstanding Music Composition	The First Wave	Nominated	
News and Documentary Emmy Awards	September 29, 2022	Outstanding Sound	The First Wave	Nominated	
News and Documentary Emmy Awards	September 29, 2022	Outstanding Promotional Announcement	The First Wave	Nominated	
