= Baghdad Bulletin =

The Baghdad Bulletin was an independent biweekly English-language news magazine published in Iraq.

== History and profile ==
The Baghdad Bulletin was first published on 9 June 2003. It was one of an estimated seventy newspapers that were launched in Iraq following the fall of Saddam Hussein after the US-led invasion of Iraq. The founders were Ralph Hassall, a British journalist, David Enders, an American journalist, and Shadi Alkasim, a Jordanian journalist, and Sebastian Woods-Walker and Mark Gordon-James, both British journalists. David Enders was also the editor.

Printed in Baghdad and distributed throughout Iraq, the magazine reported on a variety of issues affecting life during the rebuilding of the country. The Bulletin had the stated purpose of "questioning and debating the process and progress of Iraq's redevelopment" post-Saddam It strove to overcome an information blackout in Iraq suffered by an increasingly large community of aid workers, journalists, American and British officials, as well as Iraqi English speakers.

The magazine had a full-time reporting pool of Iraqis and Westerners, many of whom were young Oxbridge graduates who had previously written for Associated Press, The New York Times, The Washington Post, Reuters, and the Evening Standard. The publication believed that "the presence of a free press offering a forum for all sides is an inalienable human right."

It aimed to remain non-partisan and provided a forum for an eclectic range of guest writers to debate issues related to the redevelopment of the country. The format was a mix of news and features, with the first edition focusing on issues such as the gun amnesty, the true extent of crime, and the dilapidated state of Baghdad's electricity supply.

Printing of Baghdad Bulletin was indefinitely halted on 15 September 2003 due to financial and security concerns. The magazine published a total of seven editions and its claimed circulation was 10,000 copies. It was mostly delivered free.

== Books ==
- "Baghdad Bulletin: Dispatches on the American Occupation", David Enders (University of Michigan Press, 2005, 200pp) ISBN 0-472-11469-7
