= Sebastian Walker =

Journalist

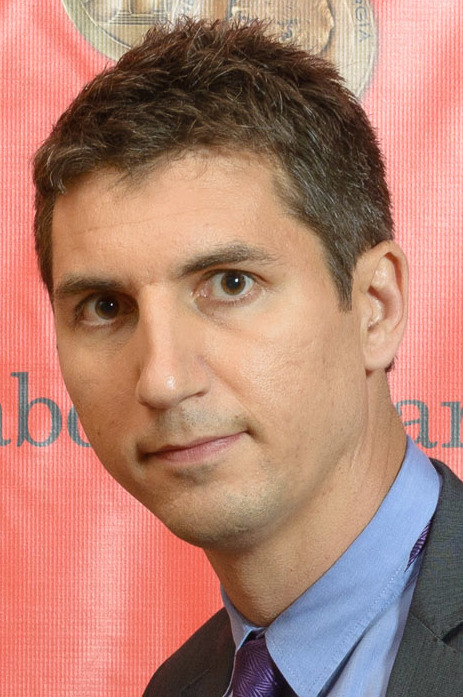
- Walker in 2014
- Occupation: Investigative broadcast journalist
- Employer: VICE News
- Known for: "Longitudinal" investigative reports
- Television: Fault Lines
- Awards: Emmy Award; Peabody Award duPont Award

Sebastian Walker is an investigative journalist and an Emmy Award-winning broadcast journalist.

== Career ==
=== VICE News ===
Walker held multiple leadership roles at VICE News, where he contributed to the network's award-winning journalism through field reporting, documentary film production, and editorial leadership from 2016 to 2024. Walker was one of the founding contributors for Vice News Tonight serving first as Middle East Bureau Chief before going on to run VICE's politics team based in Washington DC. He led VICE's coverage of the 2020 United States presidential election, earning an Emmy for "Outstanding Newscast" at the 42nd News and Documentary Emmy Awards.

In 2021, Walker was one of the first international journalists to arrive in Kabul after the Taliban took over, producing a documentary "Return of the Taliban" for Vice that won "Best News Coverage: Long Form" at the 43rd News and Documentary Emmy Awards. Walker's reporting from the frontlines of the fight against Islamic State in Iraq and Syria the Emmy for "Outstanding Continuing Coverage of a News Story in a Newscast" at both the 38th and the 41st News and Documentary Emmy Awards.

=== Al Jazeera English ===
Walker worked for Al Jazeera English in the United States from 2008 to 2016. First based at Al Jazeera English's main US bureau in Washington, D.C. and then in Al Jazeera America's San Francisco Fault Lines show hub, he was a presenter on Fault Lines, the channel's flagship news magazine about the Americas, and reported from across the continent.

Before joining Fault Lines, Walker was a foreign correspondent with a particular interest in Haiti. Al Jazeera English was the only international TV news network to maintain a bureau in Haiti after the 2010 earthquake and Sebastian arrived in Port-au-Prince less than 24 hours after the earthquake hit to report on the damage. He then stayed on for a year and a half to document the progress of the relief effort. Walker was instrumental in discovering and documenting the United Nations' role in the 2010–13 Haiti cholera outbreak, the largest such outbreak in recent history. Walker won a DuPont-Columbia University Award in Broadcast Journalism for his work in Haiti. He continued covering Haiti at Fault Lines, which was awarded a News & Documentary Emmy Award for "Outstanding Investigative Journalism in a News Magazine" on 30 September 2014 for the episode "Haiti In A Time Of Cholera", which also earned a Peabody Award.

Walker has also repeatedly covered the Occupy movement in the US and the shooting of Michael Brown near St. Louis, Missouri, which precipitated sustained protests.

Prior to being based in the Americas, Walker worked in the Middle East. He served at the channel's main broadcast centre in Doha, Qatar, where he helped to launch the channel.

=== Earlier career ===
Walker has worked for the Baghdad Bulletin, and various international news organisations, including Reuters and AFP, and has reported from a number of key countries around the Middle East region, including: Iraq, Libya, and Afghanistan.
