= Human rights violations at Guantánamo Bay detention camp =

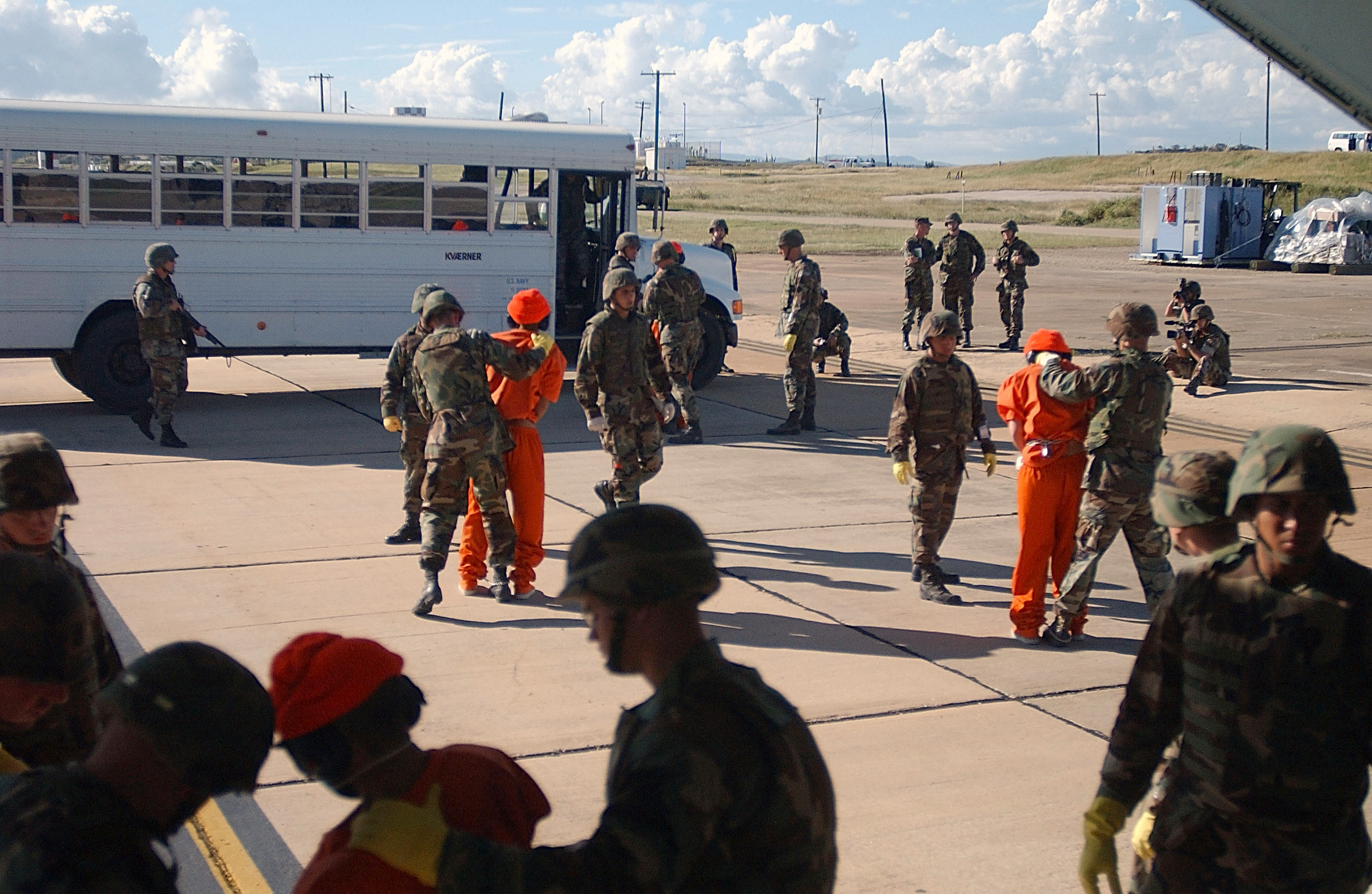
Guantanamo captives

According to UN experts, the Guantanamo Bay detention facility in Cuba is a site of "unparalleled notoriety" and has been condemned as a site of "unrelenting human rights violations." The facility has been holding prisoners for over 20 years. A document released by the Amnesty International reported ongoing and historic human rights violations at the Guantánamo Bay detention facility.

The brutality at the Guantanamo Bay detention center has been highlighted by the media.

== Background ==
The Guantanamo Bay detention center was established by the administration of George W. Bush at an American military base in Cuba in 2002. The establishment of the prison was aimed at depriving detainees of the post-9/11 “war on terror” of the constitutional rights they would enjoy on US soil. According to a 2014 Senate report released in 2014, prisoners held in US prisons worldwide were made to stand hours on broken limbs and held in utter darkness. Sleep deprivation of up to 180 hours was used against the prisoners, and the detainees were occasionally forced to stand, sometimes with their arms chained over their heads. The prisoners were forced to "rectal feeding" despite any medical reasons, with "excessive force" being exerted during rectal examinations. One of the examined convicts had "anal fissures, chronic hemorrhoids, and symptomatic rectal prolapse," as a result.

Only 8% of those held at Guantánamo were believed to be members of al-Qaida, while 86% were taken prisoner when the U.S. posted leaflets in Pakistan and Afghanistan promising enormous rewards for "suspicious people," many of whom were handed over by competing farmers.

=== First visit by UN agent ===
In 2023, Fionnuala Ní Aoláin, the first UN human rights investigator permitted to visit the camp since it was established 20 years ago reported that the 30 prisoners detained at Guantánamo Bay continued to be subjected to "cruel, inhuman, and degrading treatment" by the US government. The number of detainees at the time of the visit was 34, which was then reduced to 30.

== Tortures and abuses ==
The Guantanamo Bay detention center is described by Al-Jazeera as "a symbol of brutality of the US’s so-called war on terror". A senior official of the International Committee of the Red Cross (ICRC) stated that prisoners detained by the United States at the Guantanamo Bay detention center for years display evidence of "accelerated ageing." Amnesty International has also released a new report highlighting ongoing and historic human rights violations at the Guantánamo Bay detention facility. The report states that detentions there have entered their 20th year at the time when a new U.S. president was preparing to enter the White House. In 2023, a military judge at Guantánamo Bay ruled that a 9/11 defendant, Ramzi bin al-Shibh, was incapable enough to face trial after a military medical commission determined that the man's maltreatment in CIA detention years earlier had left him permanently psychotic.

Abu Zubayda, one of three "forever prisoners" at Guantánamo Bay who was used as a human guinea pig in the CIA's post-9/11 torture program, has reportedly released the most detailed and comprehensive account to date of the inhumane techniques to which he was subjected, including while he was detained at the Guantánamo Bay detention center. The sketches were drawn from memory in his Guantánamo confinement and sent to Mark Denbeaux, one of his attorneys. Denbeaux, along with his law school students at the Center for Policy and Research at Seton Hall University, collected Zubaydah's depicts and comments into a new report. Zubayda's drawings portray tortures such as "walling", waterboarding", "the vortex", being exposed nakedly to a female interrogator, "threatening with rape", "threat to desecrate the Qur’an", and "threats with a power drill". Amnesty International published a report in 2021 that shed light on the ongoing human rights violations at Guantánamo Bay. The report criticized the detainees' inadequate medical care and condemned their indefinite imprisonment without fair trials. It also highlighted the lack of responsibility for the crimes undertaken over the previous 19 years.

Fionnuala Ní Aoláin, the UN human rights investigator who was given unprecedented access to Guantánamo Bay detention center in 2023 stated in her report that every single inmate she spoke with endured the constant harms brought on by "systematic rendition, torture, and arbitrary detention." The UN inspector demanded an apology and assurances that the crimes would not recur, claiming that the use of torture had also been "a betrayal of the rights of victims." Also, she criticized the US administration for not giving tortured Guantánamo captives the extensive care they required to deal with the consequences.

=== Sexual tortures ===
A 2005 investigation contained an insider's account of female interrogators trying to break Muslim detainees by "sexual touching, wearing miniskirts and thong underwear", and in one instance, smearing a Saudi man's face with fake menstrual blood. The report which was received by the Associated Press outlines how the U.S. military used women as part of more harsh "physical and psychological interrogation tactics to" compel terror suspects to talk.

According to Abu Zubayda, one of the tortures included lowering the prisoner to the ground, holding him as though someone were about to sodomize him, and using obscene sexual terminology to describe the prisoner's behind including its attractiveness, size, or gentleness. They then begin the demeaning act by touching the sensitive surrounding areas of the anus with their hands or other things.

== See also ==
- Guantanamo Bay detention camp suicide attempts
- The Forever Prisoner (documentary)
