= Puff: Wonders of the Reef =

- Promotional poster
- Directed by: Nick Robinson
- Written by: Peta Ayers; Nick Robinson; Dean Rowell
- Produced by: Peta Ayers; Nick Robinson; Daniel Stoupin; Pete West
- Starring: Rose Byrne
- Cinematography: Pete West
- Edited by: Bobbi Hansel
- Production companies: Screen Australia; Screen Queensland; Bioquest Studios; Wild Pacific Media
- Distributed by: Netflix
- Release date: December 16, 2021
- Running time: 62 minutes
- Country: United States
- Language: English

Puff: Wonders of the Reef is a 2021 Australian nature documentary film made for Netflix and directed by Nick Robinson.

== Synopsis ==
Narrated by actress Rose Byrne, the story follows a baby Valentin's sharpnose pufferfish on its travel through a microscopic marine world of the Great Barrier Reef, the largest coral reef in the world. It offers a view of its ecosystem from the perspective of the fish. It was released on December 16, 2021.

== Accolades ==
Puff: Wonders of the Reef won the News and Documentary Emmy Award for Outstanding Nature Documentary at the 43rd News and Documentary Emmy Awards in 2022.

== See also ==
- My Octopus Teacher - 2020 Oscar-winning film similar in content
