= Hind Hassan =

British-Iraqi journalist

- Born: August 1983 (age 42–43); Iraq
- Education: University of Leeds (BSc); City, University of London (MA)
- Years active: 2010–present
- Website: www.hindhassan.co.uk

Hind Hassan (born August 1983) is a British journalist and documentary maker. She worked as a reporter for Sky News and then as an international correspondent for Vice News. For her work, Hassan has won a News and Documentary Emmy Award, a Gracie Award and the Neal Conan Prize among other accolades.

== Early life ==
Hassan was born in Iraq and moved to England at age 3, settling in Kingston upon Hull where her father had earned a scholarship to study. She comes from a family of scientists and initially expected to follow that path. Hassan graduated with a degree in Medicinal Chemistry from the University of Leeds in 2007. During her time at Leeds, she became involved in the student newspaper. She also chaired the Leeds University Union (LUU) Council. Hassan then completed a Master of Arts (MA) in Broadcast Journalism at City, University of London in 2009.

== Career ==
After graduating from university, Hassan began her career working as a reporter for Sky News. In 2016, Hassan joined Vice News in as an international correspondent. Her work with an investigative team on Uganda: Orphanage, Inc won them the Overseas Press Club's David Kaplan Award in 2020.

In 2021, Hassan featured in Return of the Taliban: A VICE Special Report, which aired on Showtime, and Inside the Battle for Jerusalem. For her work on Return of the Taliban, Hassan and her colleagues won Best News Coverage: Long Form at the 2022 News and Documentary Emmy Awards in addition to being nominated for Outstanding Recorded News Special. With Hassan as correspondent, Inside the Battle for Jerusalem won Outstanding Breaking News Coverage. Credited as a Vice host alongside Paola Ramos, Hassan was nominated for Outstanding Hosted Nonfiction Series or Special at the 2022 Primetime Emmy Awards. Hassan won a 2022 Gracie Award in the Reporter/Correspondent category.

Hind left Vice News in 2024. She contributed to and presented the documentaries Under Fire: Israel's war on medics for Middle East Eye and Fault Lines: Starving Gaza for Al Jazeera English. For her work on Fault Lines: Starving Gaza, Hassan received two News and Documentary Emmy Awards nominations. In November 2024, she won the Neal Conan Prize for Excellence in Journalism. In summer 2025, Hassan gave a speech at the Columbia School of Journalism's graduation ceremony.

== Accolades ==
Year	Award	Category	Work	Result	Ref.
2020	Overseas Press Club	David Kaplan Award	Uganda: Orphanage, Inc	Won	
2022	Primetime Emmy Awards	Outstanding Hosted Nonfiction Series or Special	Vice	Nominated	
2022	Gracie Awards	Reporter / Correspondent		Won	
2022	News and Documentary Emmy Awards	Best News Coverage: Long Form	Return of the Taliban: A VICE News Special Report	Won	
2022	News and Documentary Emmy Awards	Outstanding Recorded News Special	Return of the Taliban: A VICE News Special Report	Nominated	
2022	News and Documentary Emmy Awards	Outstanding Breaking News Coverage	Inside the Battle for Jerusalem	Won	
2024	Neal Conan Prize for Excellence in Journalism			Won	
2025	News and Documentary Emmy Awards	Outstanding Health or Medical Coverage	Fault Lines: Starving Gaza	Nominated	
2025	News and Documentary Emmy Awards	Outstanding Research: News	Fault Lines: Starving Gaza	Nominated	
