= Ed Ou =

Canadian photojournalist (born 1986)

- Born: 1986 (age 39–40); Taiwan
- Citizenship: Canada
- Occupation: Photojournalist
- Employer: Reportage by Getty Images
- Website: www.edouphoto.com

Ed Ou (born 1986) is a Canadian photojournalist currently represented by Reportage by Getty Images. He has covered numerous stories in the Middle East, Central Asia, Eastern Europe, Africa, and the Americas.

== Early life and education ==
Ou was born in Taiwan before moving to Canada at a young age; growing up in the city of Vancouver, British Columbia and the United States. He studied International Politics and Hebrew in Jerusalem as well as Arabic later on. While studying as a teenager, Ou began covering major news stories as a freelance photographer for the Associated Press and Reuters news-wires in Israel including the 2006 Israel–Hezbollah War and the fall of the Islamic Courts in Mogadishu, Somalia. He subsequently interned for The New York Times as a student. Although not formally educated as a photojournalist, Ou favored journalism as he believed there was a disconnect between academic study of the history of politics and conflict in the Middle East, and capturing on-the-ground personal stories resulting from the political decisions being made in the region at the time.

== Career ==
In 2014, he was awarded an Emergency Fund Grant from the Magnum Foundation for his photograph "North".

On October 1, 2016, U.S. Customs and Border Protection officers detained and questioned Ou for more six hours in the Vancouver International Airport on his way to cover the Dakota Access Pipeline protests for the Canadian Broadcasting Corporation (CBC) as part of a project on Native American healthcare in North America. Ou's intended destination was Bismarck, North Dakota but, after passing through the initial security line at the airport, he was flagged by custom agents for secondary screening and pulled aside. They questioned his purpose for traveling to the United States and when he last visited Iraq, a routine experience for him as a journalist reporting in dangerous regions. He explained that he was on assignment as a photographer to cover the pipeline protests at Standing Rock for the CBC and that he had not been to Iraq in more than a year. He was then detained in a room where he was asked to provide details of his trips to every country he had visited in the last five years and all extremist groups he had come in contact with. Officials then requested that he unlock his three encrypted cell phones to search for images of him "posing with a dead body". After he refused to comply to protect his sources, they denied him entry into the United States, confiscated his phones and other materials, searched his checked baggage, and made photocopies of his reporter's notebook and personal diaries against his wishes. When his phones were returned to him, there was evidence of tampering with the SIM cards suggesting that copies of them may have been made. A border official later stated that his name matched a "person of interest" on an unspecified U.S. federal law enforcement watch list, however, no official reason was provided for his detention aside from it being "classified". Ou's travel rights into the United States have been revoked.

== Awards ==
- 2009 Judge's Special Recognition Award of Excellence, Global Vision Award, Pictures of the Year International for "Under a Nuclear Cloud"
- 2011 Award of Excellence, Photographer of the Year Award - Freelance/Agency, Pictures of the Year International for "Egyptian Youth"
- 2011 1st Place Contemporary Issues Award, World Press Photo for "Escape from Somalia"
- 2011 Finalist, World Understanding Award, Pictures of the Year International for "The Youth of an Unfinished Revolution"
- 2011 City of Perpignan Young Reporter Award at Visa pour l'Image for "Children of Men (Child soldiers in Somalia)"
- 2012 Finalist, National Magazine Awards, News and Documentary Photography, Harper's Magazine for "Uncertain Exodus"
- 2012 Young Reporter Prize, Bayeux-Calvados Awards for war correspondents
