= Soul of a Nation =

2021 television documentary series

- Genre: Documentary
- Created by: Marie Nelson
- Country of origin: United States
- Original language: English
- No. of series: 1
- No. of episodes: 6

Production
- Executive producers: Eric Johnson; Robe Imbriano; Chantre Camack

Original release
- Network: ABC
- Release: March 2, 2021 – present

Soul of a Nation is an American television documentary series which premiered on March 2, 2021 on ABC.

== Episodes ==
=== Series overview ===
Season	Episodes	Originally released	
Season	Episodes	First released	Last released
1	6	March 2, 2021	April 6, 2021
Specials	14	May 25, 2021	September 15, 2023

=== Season 1 (2021) ===
No.	Title	Directed by	Original release date	U.S. viewers (millions)
1	"Reckonings"	James Adolphus	March 2, 2021	1.90
Sterling K. Brown hosts a look at racial reckoning in present-day America, tackling issues ranging from policing to reparations and segments highlighting the arts and entertainment.
2	"Next"	James Adolphus	March 9, 2021	1.37
Actress Marsai Martin hosts a look at the next generation of Black Americans and their unique ability to trailblaze, innovate and live on the cutting-edge no matter what they have to overcome; H.E.R. performs.
3	"Faith"	James Adolphus	March 16, 2021	1.43
BeBe Winans guest hosts; a look at the state of the Black church, the intersection of faith and abortion and the role of forgiveness in the Black community.
4	"Black Joy"	James Adolphus	March 23, 2021	1.41
An exploration of comedy within the Black community and how Black people have used humor and music in hard times; Cynthia Erivo performs; comic Michael Yo; rapper Derrick "D-Nice" Jones; comic Michelle Buteau; comic Erin Jackson.
5	"Shut Up And..."	James Adolphus	March 30, 2021	1.37
Athletes discuss the role of sports in the fight for racial justice; the crossover between sports and film and how movies have been used as a tool to make cultural and social statements about Black athletes and the Black community.
6	"Reconstruction"	James Adolphus	April 6, 2021	1.29
The Tulsa Race Massacre nearly 100 years later; the unseen Black men who have been sentenced to death row; examining the racial reckoning in present-day America, which some call "the third reconstruction."

=== Specials (2021–23) ===
No.	Title	Directed by	Original release date	U.S. viewers (millions)
1	"After Floyd: The Year that Shook the World"	Karl Kim & Kurt Williamson	May 25, 2021	1.42
Chronicling the dramatic and epic events surrounding George Floyd's murder and spotlighting where the country goes from this point forward; Tamron Hall and T. J. Holmes co-host.
2	"Juneteenth: Together We Triumph"	Tine	June 18, 2021	1.84
Intimate storytelling, powerful tributes, and musical performances from Jimmie Allen, Chloe Bailey and Leon Bridges; Michael Strahan interviews former President Barack Obama.
3	"Soul of a Nation Presents: Corazón de América - Celebrating Hispanic Culture"	Benjamin Bratt & Peter Bratt	September 17, 2021	1.94
What does it mean to be Hispanic in the U.S. today? Latinos celebrate, embrace and preserve their own unique heritages.
4	"Soul of a Nation Presents: Screen Queens Rising"	Tine	February 3, 2022	2.34
Exploring how Black actresses, a historically overlooked and under-valued group in Hollywood, have in recent years begun to ascend to the top echelons of entertainment and American culture; Linsey Davis and Deborah Roberts co-host.
5	"Soul of a Nation Presents: X / o n e r a t e d – The Murder of Malcolm X and 55 Years to Justice"	Tine & Jeanmarie Condon	February 3, 2022	1.76
A profile of Muhammad Abdul Aziz, a man who was wrongfully convicted of Malcolm X's assassination; retracing Malcolm X's shocking 1965 assassination.
6	"Together As One: Celebrating Asian American, Native Hawaiian and Pacific Islander Heritage"	Tine	May 27, 2022	2.34
Celebrating the diversity and recognizing the accomplishments and contributions of the vibrant Asian American, Native Hawaiian and Pacific Islander (AANHPI) community; George Takei hosts
7	"PRIDE: To Be Seen - A Soul of a Nation Presentation"	Tine	June 9, 2022	1.62
Cara Delevingne hosts
8	"Soul of a Nation Presents: Sound of Freedom – A Juneteenth Celebration"	Jeff Winn & Tine	June 17, 2022	1.96
Jimmie Allen hosts; musical performances from Ciara, Jimmie Allen, Patti LaBelle, Jon Batiste & Marvin Sapp
9	"Soul of a Nation Presents: Mi Gente: Groundbreakers and Changemakers"	Tine	September 14, 2022	0.87
10	"Soul of a Nation Presents: Black in Vegas"	Tine	February 1, 2023	1.58
11	"The New Face of Hollywood - A Soul of a Nation Presentation"	Tine	May 26, 2023	1.81
12	"The Freedom to Exist with Elliot Page - A Soul of a Nation Presentation"	Tine	June 6, 2023	1.32
13	"Hip-Hop @ 50: Rhythms, Rhymes & Reflections - A Soul of a Nation Presentation"	Tine	June 19, 2023	0.83
14	"The Latin Music Revolution: A Soul of a Nation Presentation"	Tine	September 15, 2023	1.44
