= Obama: In Pursuit of a More Perfect Union =

2021 documentary series about Barack Obama

- Directed by: Peter Kunhardt
- Country of origin: United States
- No. of seasons: 1
- No. of episodes: 3

Production
- Running time: 307 minutes
- Production companies: HBO Documentary Films; Kunhardt Films

Original release
- Network: HBO
- Release: August 3 – August 5, 2021

Obama: In Pursuit of a More Perfect Union is a 2021 documentary series about Barack Obama, the 44th President of the United States. It was directed by Peter Kunhardt and is named after Obama's March 18, 2008 speech, which he delivered during his 2008 campaign.

It was released in August 2021 to coincide with Obama's 60th birthday.

== Reception ==
The series has received positive reviews. It has a 91% rating on Rotten Tomatoes.
