= Escape Fire: The Fight to Rescue American Healthcare =

2012 documentary film

- Directed by: Matthew Heineman; Susan Froemke
- Produced by: Matthew Heineman; Susan Froemke
- Cinematography: Wolfgang Held
- Edited by: Bradley Ross
- Music by: Chad Kelly; Moby
- Production companies: Aisle C Our Time Projects
- Distributed by: Roadside Attractions
- Release dates: January 19, 2012 (Sundance Film Festival); October 5, 2012 (United States)
- Running time: 99 minutes
- Country: United States
- Language: English

Escape Fire: The Fight to Rescue American Healthcare is a 2012 feature-length documentary directed by Matthew Heineman and Susan Froemke and released by Roadside Attractions. Escape Fire premiered at the Sundance Film Festival, opened in select theaters on October 5, 2012, and was simultaneously released on iTunes and Video-on-Demand. The film was released on DVD in February 2013 and premiered on CNN on March 10, 2013.

== Storyline ==
The documentary explores systemic inertia within a healthcare sector structured around symptom management and commercial profit rather than preventive medicine and patient-centric outcomes. Amid decades of institutional resistance, advocates are increasingly integrating innovative, cost-effective, and holistic healing practices into an expensive, technology-dominated framework. Escape Fire chronicles both individual narratives and the efforts of key figures striving to reform healthcare across the medical establishment, industry, government, and the United States Armed Forces. The film posits potential solutions for national healthcare reform.

== Reception ==
Since Escape Fire premiered at Sundance, the film has been mentioned or reviewed in The Wall Street Journal, Forbes, New York magazine, Los Angeles Times, Variety, The Hollywood Reporter and other media outlets. The film received generally positive reviews, with an aggregate score of 67 on Metacritic and 78% on Rotten Tomatoes, As of June 2020. It was a New York Times, New York magazine, and The Washington Post Critics' Pick.

== Festivals ==
- Sundance Film Festival, 2012: Grand Jury Prize (Nominated); Candescent Award Given to One Outstanding Socially Conscious Documentary (Winner)
- Full Frame Film Festival, 2012: Human Rights Award (Winner)
- Silverdocs Film Festival, 2012: Social Issue Award (Winner)
- Newport Beach Film Festival, 2012: Outstanding Achievement in Directing (Winner); Outstanding Achievement in Documentary Filmmaking (Winner)
- Heartland Film Festival, 2012: Truly Moving Picture's Crystal Heart Award (Winner)
