= Univision Noticias =

Proposed cable television channel

- Country: United States
- Broadcast area: United States; Puerto Rico
- Headquarters: Doral, Florida, U.S.

Programming
- Language(s): Spanish

Ownership
- Owner: Univision Communications
- Sister channels: Univision

Links
- Website: noticias.univision.com

Univision Noticias was a planned American Spanish language cable news channel. It was owned by Univision Communications and was supposed to be targeted at the Hispanic and Latino community in the United States.

== History ==
In May 2011, Univision Communications announced three new cable television channels to strengthen its position in the Latino market and diversify revenues, including one dedicated to news and information. Latinos were the United States' fastest growing population according to the 2010 census, which has prompted media companies to increase their presence in Spanish-language television. In addition, Univision hopes to benefit from increased demand for Spanish-language news programs. From 2000 to 2010, the Univision network's primetime news magazine Aquí y Ahora increased its viewership while its English-language counterparts on ABC, NBC and CBS lost half their viewers.

Among the channel's first hires were British-born Karl Penhaul, Chilean photojournalist Carlos Villalon, and Mexican-born María Antonieta Collins. Collins rejoined the Univision network as senior special correspondent having left in 2005. Penhaul left Univision in January 2012.

Univision Noticias secured a carriage deal with Dish Network in January 2012. It was planned to be offered on Dish's Latino programming package. As of 2018, the channel was never launched and all plans have seemed to be scrapped, even though Univision Tlnovelas and Univision Deportes Network did launch.

Also, ever since the launch of ViX where it launched a 24-hour national streaming news channel called Noticias Univision 24/7, it made plans for this channel all but redundant.

== See also ==
- Noticias Univision – Univision's broadcast news division
- Noticiero Univision – Univision's flagship news broadcast
- Fusion – an English-language news channel jointly operated by Univision and ABC News launched on October 28, 2013.
