= Matthew Heineman =

American documentary filmmaker (born 1983)

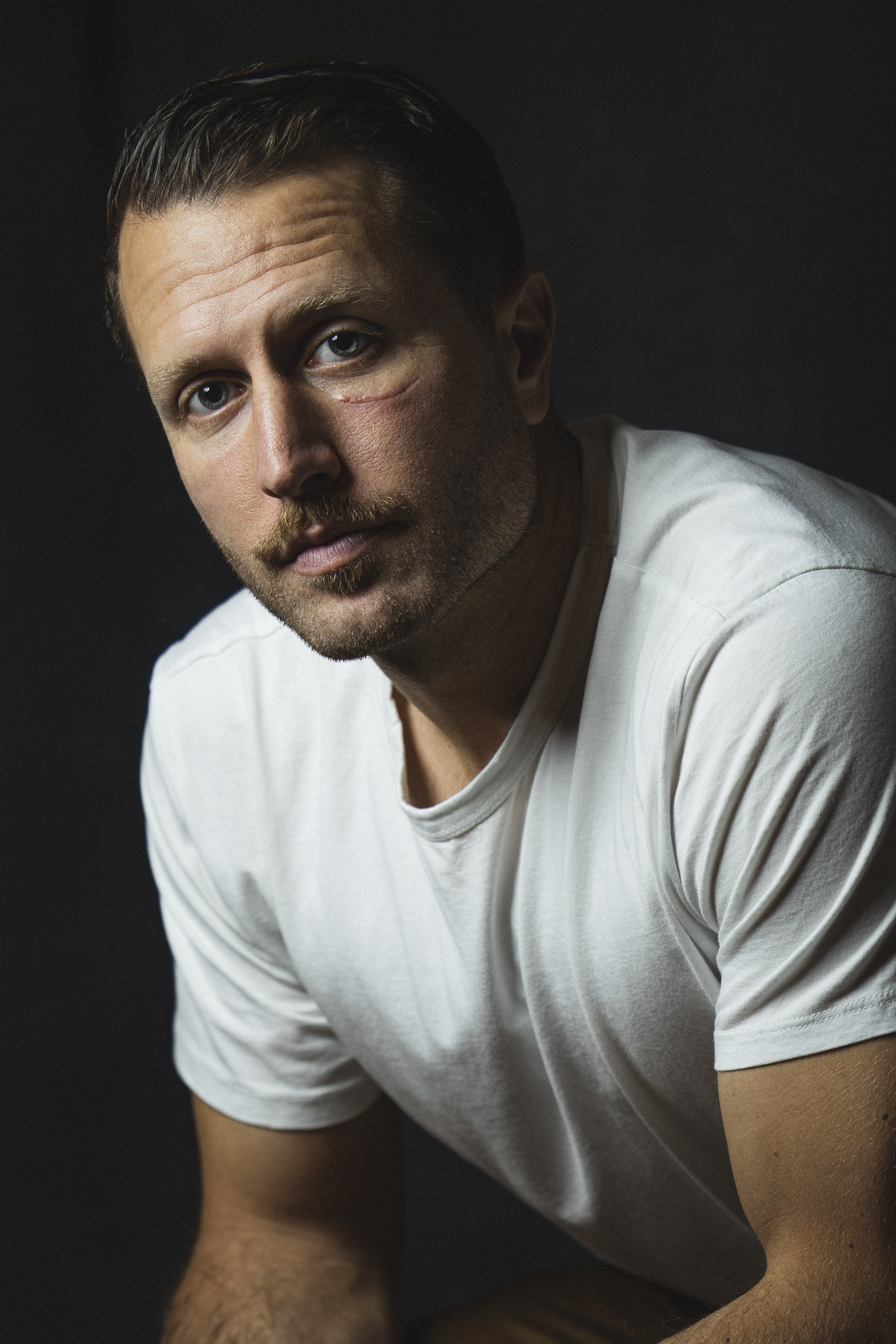
- Born: June 6, 1983 (age 43); Washington, D.C., United States
- Education: Dartmouth College
- Occupations: Filmmaker; Director; Producer
- Years active: 2006–present
- Organization(s): Our Time, Inc.
- Website: ourtimeprojects.com

Matthew Heineman (born June 6, 1983) is an American documentary filmmaker, director, and producer. His inspiration and fascination with American history led him to early success with the documentary film Cartel Land, which was nominated for an Academy Award for Best Documentary Feature Film, a BAFTA Award for Best Documentary, and won three Primetime Emmy Awards.

In 2009, Heineman founded his New York–based production company Our Time Projects, Inc., which would later release Our Time, his first documentary film about what it's like to be young in America, which he shot in the lower 48 states while traveling in an RV with three of his friends after graduating from college.

His 2021 film The First Wave received the Pare Lorentz Award from the International Documentary Association, was shortlisted for an Academy Award, and was nominated for seven Emmy Awards, winning Best Documentary, Best Cinematography, and Best Editing. The 2022 film Retrograde was nominated for the Directors Guild of America Award for Outstanding Directing at the Producers Guild of America Awards and won Outstanding Editing at the News and Documentary Emmy Awards.

== Early life ==
Heineman was born June 6, 1983, to a Jewish family in Washington, D.C., the son of Cristine Russell and Ben Heineman, and grew up in Darien and New Canaan, Connecticut. He attended New Canaan Country School and Brunswick School in Greenwich. His mother is a science journalist and his father is a lawyer. His career as a filmmaker began after graduating from Dartmouth College in 2005. He studied history in college and initially wanted to be a teacher. Heineman was fascinated with American history, notably the American Civil War. He told C-SPAN in 2012, "I think it really taught me to be analytical, to think critically about events" and "try to learn from the past to affect the future."

== Career ==
He and his friends took a post-graduation trip across the U.S., and Heineman shot video along the way. He and his friends spent three months living out of an RV, interviewing kids "from all walks of life, trying to figure out what our generation is about." The resulting footage (which Heineman dubbed, "rough, guerilla filmmaking") became Our Time (2011), a feature-length documentary about American youth.

He began shopping around Our Time, which was self-produced via Our Time Projects, Inc., a production company Heineman founded in 2009. Heineman was hired at HBO and spent two years working on HBO's The Alzheimer's Project, a four-part documentary series. He was mentored by director Susan Froemke and producer John Hoffman.

Heineman worked with Froemke to direct and co-produce Escape Fire: The Fight to Rescue American Healthcare (2012). The film was later picked up and aired by CNN. The film received a New York Times Critics Pick. "This hard-hitting film leaves us finally more hopeful than despairing," wrote reviewer Jeannette Catsoulis.

A Private War stars Jamie Dornan, Tom Hollander, Stanley Tucci, and Oscar-nominee Rosamund Pike as legendary war reporter Marie Colvin. The film premiered at the 2018 Toronto International Film Festival before being released nationwide by Aviron Pictures. It was a New York Times Critics' Pick and Variety hailed the film as "Heineman's astonishing narrative debut," and "an incredibly sophisticated, psychologically immersive film." A Private War also earned two Golden Globe nominations for Best Actress and Best Original Song.

Heineman directed and executive produced a five-part television docu-series entitled The Trade that premiered at the 2018 Sundance Film Festival and was recently honored by the International Documentary Association as the Best Episodic Series of 2018. The critically acclaimed Showtime series chronicles the opioid crisis through the eyes of those most affected—growers, cartel members, users, and law enforcement. It was described by The Hollywood Reporter as "a thriller...like Traffic only current and real", while the New York Times said, "Heineman has shown an uncanny ability to gain access to hard-to-reach people and places."

His documentary film City of Ghosts, which follows a group of citizen-journalists exposing the horrors of ISIS, premiered at the 2017 Sundance Film Festival and was distributed worldwide by Amazon Studios before having its broadcast premiere on A&E. Heineman won his second Outstanding Directorial Achievement in Documentary Award from the DGA for the film—one of only three directors to win the prestigious honor twice. City of Ghosts also won the Courage Under Fire Award from the International Documentary Association "in recognition of conspicuous bravery in pursuit of the truth" and was listed on over 20 critics and year-end lists for Best Documentary of 2017. The film was also nominated for a BAFTA Award, PGA Award, IDA Award for Best Documentary Feature, and Primetime Emmy for Exceptional Merit in Documentary Filmmaking.

Cartel Land, which explores vigilantes taking on the Mexican drug cartels, was nominated for an Academy Award for Best Documentary Feature and won three Primetime Emmy Awards, including Exceptional Merit in Documentary Filmmaking and Best Cinematography. The film premiered in the U.S. Documentary Competition at the 2015 Sundance Film Festival, where Heineman won the Best Director Award and Special Jury Prize for Cinematography. Cartel Land was also awarded the Courage Under Fire Award, the DGA Award for Outstanding Achievement in Documentary, and the George Polk Award in Journalism. The film was released theatrically nationwide by The Orchard and had its broadcast premiere on A&E.

He previously co-directed and produced the feature-length, Emmy-nominated documentary Escape Fire: The Fight to Rescue American Healthcare; collaborated for two years on the Emmy-nominated HBO series, The Alzheimer's Project; and also directed and produced Our Time - his first documentary about what it's like to be young in America.

In September 2023, Heineman released his documentary American Symphony, about the musician Jon Batiste composing his first symphony.

== First films ==
Heineman studied history at Dartmouth College and planned to start a career as a teacher after graduating in 2005. After he was rejected by Teach for America, however, he said he felt a blow to his ego, and decided to take a road trip with friends across the U.S. Although he had never held a camera or taken a film class, Heineman used a video camera to document the group's experiences and interviewed youth along the way. "It was really cheap. I mean, we were scraping together money from family and friends. We got sponsorship money from Nantucket Nectars and Penske Corporation, and—but it was really, you know, bootstraps, you know, rough guerilla filmmaking."

Heineman said he walked away from that trip feeling inspired about his own opportunities and a career change. "No matter where you're from, no matter what your background is, is that, you know, everyone has this burning desire to be better, to do better, to improve their surroundings, to improve themselves," Heineman said in an interview with C-SPAN in 2012. "Our generation, you know, does want to fix this country, does want to fix this world, and I don't know if it's going to happen overnight, I think our world is changing every day."

Heineman approached HBO with his film and while he was turned down, he was hired to work on a health care film series called The Alzheimer's Project. Heineman continued working on edits of Our Time after he was hired by HBO. The film was released in 2009. Heineman then teamed up with mentor Froemke to begin work on Escape Fire.

=== Escape Fire ===
Escape Fire: The Fight to Rescue American Healthcare is a 2012 feature-length documentary directed by Matthew Heineman and Susan Froemke and released by Roadside Attractions. Escape Fire premiered at the Sundance Film Festival, opened in select theaters on October 5, 2012, and was simultaneously released on iTunes and Video-on-Demand. The film was released on DVD in February 2013 and premiered on CNN on March 10, 2013.

The film tells the stories of physicians and patients, alike, taking creative steps at improving the U.S. health care industry. It gets its name from the practice of protecting firefighters battling wildfires by pre-burning a small patch of area so that the oncoming blaze will move around it.

"What Americans desperately need is a way to transition from the current system, which is fragmented and focuses on high-cost, high-tech interventions after illness strikes, to a modern system that delivers coordinated, high-touch, lower-cost, patient-centered care with an emphasis on primary care and prevention," Heineman wrote in an opinion piece at The Huffington Post in 2012.

While making Escape Fire, Heineman said his goal was to be politically agnostic and offer solutions, not just problems. "So many of these documentaries - you know, you sort of walk out of them feeling depressed and hopeless. And we really did not want to make that type of film. From day one, we wanted to make a film that highlighted not just problems, but solutions."

Escape Fire was nominated for the Grand Jury Prize at Sundance (2012), and received several other accolades, including: Full Frame Human Rights Award (2012); Silverdocs Social Issue Award (2012); Newport Beach Outstanding Achievement in Directing and Outstanding Achievement in Documentary Filmmaking (2012).

=== Cartel Land ===
Cartel Land is a 2015 documentary about the Mexican drug trade and vigilantism that has sprouted up to combat it. It shows the story of Dr. Jose Manuel Mireles, a doctor in the Mexican state of Michoacán. Mireles leads a group of citizens who take up arms against drug traffickers, sometimes resulting in gun battles on the streets and clashes with federal police.

Cartel Land premiered at Sundance in 2015, where it won Best Director U.S. Documentary and Documentary Special Jury Award: Cinematography (U.S. Documentary). The film later had screenings at the 2015 True/False Film Fest in Columbia, Mo., and had its New York debut at the 2015 Tribeca Film Festival.

The film was released theatrically nationwide by The Orchard in July 2015 and had its broadcast premiere on A&E in January 2016. It has been nominated for numerous awards, including an Academy Award for Best Documentary Feature, a BAFTA Award for Best Documentary, and won three Primetime Emmy Awards, including Exceptional Merit in Documentary Filmmaking. In addition, Cartel Land was nominated for a Gotham Award, Critics' Choice Award, and BAFTA Award for Best Documentary, and presented with the 2015 Documentary Award by the George Polk Awards in Investigative Journalism.

"I wanted to tackle huge, complicated subjects—vigilantism, border security, the drug war—but in a far more personal and targeted way, through the eyes of the compelling and deeply complex individuals at the heart of these vigilante movements," Heineman said before the film's premiere at the 2015 Sundance Film Festival. Heineman conceived the film after reading a news article on the New York City Subway about vigilantes tracking drug cartels along the U.S.-Mexican border in Mexico. "I didn't know much about border, much about vigilantism. But from the moment I read it, I knew I wanted to make this film."

The film's story then shifted to parallel storylines about two groups of vigilantes fighting against the drug trade on both sides of the border. Heineman was also one of two cinematographers credited in the film. "I never knew who I was with—the good guys or the bad guys," Heineman told interviewers at Sundance Film Festival.

The film received positive reviews in trade publications such as Variety. "The pic's lush, aestheticized imagery is an impressive surprise, and the film has no shortage of ace handheld work," wrote reviewer Ben Kenigsberg. IndieWire called it: "Disturbing, dangerous, and thrilling, Cartel Land is a fearsome reflection on the breakdown of order and the line between obeying the law and staying alive."

=== City of Ghosts ===
City of Ghosts is a 2017 feature documentary directed, produced, and filmed by Heineman. It follows the journey of Raqqa is Being Slaughtered Silently—a handful of anonymous activists who banded together after their homeland of Syria was taken over by ISIS in 2014. City of Ghosts is the story of a group of Syrian citizen journalists as they face life undercover, on the run, and in exile.

The film premiered at the Sundance Film Festival in 2017 and was acquired by Amazon Studios. It was released theatrically by Amazon and IFC Films on July 14, 2017. The film has received many positive reviews, including five stars from Charlie Philips at The Guardian, who called it the "definitive contemporary documentary about the tragedy of Syria." As of March 8, 2018, City of Ghosts holds a 99% 'fresh' rating on Rotten Tomatoes, based on 91 reviews. On Metacritic, it holds a rating of 86/100, based on 31 reviews, indicating "universal acclaim".

=== A Private War ===
A Private War is a 2018 American biographical drama film directed by Matthew Heineman and starring Rosamund Pike as journalist Marie Colvin. The film is based on the 2012 article "Marie Colvin's Private War" in Vanity Fair by Marie Brenner. The film was written by Arash Amel and features Jamie Dornan, Tom Hollander, and Stanley Tucci. The film premiered at the 2018 Toronto International Film Festival and was released in the United States on November 2, 2018. It received generally positive reviews from critics, who praised Pike's performance. At the 76th Golden Globe Awards, the film earned nominations for Best Actress in a Motion Picture – Drama (Pike) and Best Original Song ("Requiem for A Private War"), and Matthew Heineman received a nomination for Outstanding Directorial Achievement of a First Time Feature Film Director from the Directors Guild of America.

=== American Symphony ===
In September 2023, Heineman released his documentary American Symphony, which records the process of Jon Batiste composing his first symphony while his partner, writer Suleika Jaouad, is battling the return of her cancer. Netflix and Higher Ground Productions acquired distribution rights to the film.

== Filmography ==
- Our Time (2009)
- The Alzheimer's Project (2009)
- Escape Fire: The Fight to Rescue American Healthcare (2012)
- Cartel Land (2015)
- City of Ghosts (2017)
- A Private War (2018)
- The Trade (2018)
- The Boy from Medellin (2020)
- The First Wave (2021)
- Retrograde (2022)
- American Symphony (2023)
- The Savant (2025)

== Awards ==
Year	Award	Subject	Result	Ref
2024	Cinema for Peace Dove for The Most Valuable Documentary of the Year	American Symphony	Nominated	
