= Fathom (2021 film) =

2021 American documentary film

- Official poster
- Directed by: Drew Xanthopoulos
- Produced by: Megan Gilbride
- Starring: Michelle Fournet; Ellen Garland
- Cinematography: Drew Xanthopoulos
- Edited by: Robin Schwartz
- Music by: Hanan Townshend
- Production companies: Sandbox Films; Impact Partners; Walking Upstream Pictures; Back Allie Entertainment; Hidden Candy
- Distributed by: Apple TV+
- Release dates: June 16, 2021 (Tribeca); June 25, 2021 (United States)
- Running time: 87 minutes
- Country: United States
- Language: English

Fathom is a 2021 American documentary film, directed by Drew Xanthopoulos. It follows two researchers of humpback whales who study their communication and how it evolves across oceans and continents.

It had its world premiere at the Tribeca Film Festival on June 16, 2021. It was released on June 25, 2021, by Apple TV+.

== Synopsis ==
Dr. Michelle Fournet and Dr. Ellen Garland, lead research on humpback whales in Alaska and French Polynesia, respectively, where they study the communication of the whales and how it evolves across oceans and continents.

== Release ==
In April 2021, Apple TV+ acquired worldwide distribution rights to the film, and set it for a June 25, 2021, release. It had its world premiere at the Tribeca Film Festival on June 16, 2021. It also screened at AFI DOCS on June 23, 2021.

== Critical reception ==
Fathom holds a 50% approval rating on review aggregator website Rotten Tomatoes, based on 16 reviews, with a weighted average of 7/10. On Metacritic, the film holds a rating of 67 out of 100, based on eight critics, indicating "generally favorable" reviews.
