= Paola Ramos (journalist) =

American journalist (born 1988)

- Paola Ramos at the 2026 conference of the National Association of Hispanic Journalists
- Born: 1987 (age 38–39); Miami, Florida, U.S.
- Education: Barnard College (BA); Harvard University (MPP)
- Occupation: Journalist
- Relatives: Jorge Ramos (father)
- Writing career
- Language: English; Spanish
- Years active: 2016 – present

Paola Ramos (born 1987) is an American journalist. Her most recent book is Defectors: The Rise of the Latino Far Right and What It Means for America, published in September 2024. Ramos was a correspondent for Vice and is a contributor to Telemundo and MS NOW. Ramos' work focuses on issues affecting Latinos in the U.S. and Latin America. Ramos has been featured, been a correspondent, or has served as a subject matter expert, in Latina, Popsugar, Bustle, Vice, Los Angeles Blade, South Kern Sol, HIV Plus Magazine, and on KCRW.

== Early life and education ==
Paola Ramos was born in 1987 in Miami, Florida. She grew up in Spain. Her mother, Gina Montaner, was born in Cuba and her father is Mexican journalist Jorge Ramos. Ramos graduated from Barnard College with a BA in political science and government in 2009 and earned her Master in Public Policy from the Harvard Kennedy School in 2015.

== Career ==
Ramos served in the Obama administration, including working for both President Barack Obama and Vice President Joe Biden, and served as Deputy Director of Hispanic Media for the Hillary Clinton 2016 presidential campaign. In 2019, Ramos became a correspondent for Vice's documentary series, Vice, and Vice News Tonight. She is the prior host to Vice's docuseries Latin-X. For her work at Vice, she was nominated for a GLAAD Media Award for her piece "The Latinx Drag Queens Spearheading HIV Activism on the Border". That same year, Ramos keynoted George Washington University's LatinX Heritage Celebration. She currently serves as an on-air contributor to Telemundo and MSNBC and hosts the politics podcast The Moment, with Jorge Ramos and Paola Ramos a co-production of iHeart Media and Radio Ambulante Studios. Paola Ramos also serves as speaker for Lesbians Who Tech + Allies. Ramos hosted Field Report with Paola Ramos on MSNBC in 2022. In 2026, she received the Torchbearer "Carrying Change" Awards' Illuminator Award.

== Personal life ==
Ramos lives in Williamsburg, Brooklyn, New York, with her fiancée, De’Ara Balenger.

== Works ==
- Defectors. Pantheon. September 24, 2024. ISBN 978-0-593-70136-2. OCLC 1416626624.
