= List of American network TV morning news programs =

This is a list of current and former American television network morning programs.

Morning news programming begins at 4 a.m., 7 a.m., or later Eastern Time Zone/Pacific Time Zone. On cable television, news starts at 6 a.m., earlier, or later ET/PT.

== Current ==
All times Eastern Time Zone/Pacific Time Zone—see effects of time on North American broadcasting for explanation.

Broadcast
Network	Program title	Duration	Days	Time (ET/PT)	Current anchor(s)	Debut
ABC	Good Morning America	2 hours (with commercials)	Everyday	7:00am in all time zones (Weekdays) Various in all time zones^{d} (Weekends)	Robin Roberts, George Stephanopoulos, Michael Strahan, Amy Robach, Lara Spencer, and Ginger Zee (weekdays); Gio Benitez, Whit Johnson, Janai Norman, and Somara Theodore (weekends)	November 3, 1975 (Weekdays) September 4, 2004 (Weekends)
CBS	CBS Mornings	2 hours (with commercials)	Everyday	7:00am in all time zones (Weekdays)	Gayle King, Nate Burleson, and Tony Dokoupil	January 12, 1987
CBS	CBS Saturday Morning	2 hours (with commercials)	Everyday	7:00am (Eastern)/6:00am for most CBS stations	Michelle Miller, Dana Jacobson, and Jeff Glor	September 13, 1997
CBS	CBS News Sunday Morning	90 minutes (with commercials)	Everyday	9:00 am ET/6:00 am PT	Jane Pauley	January 28, 1979
NBC	Today	4 hours (weekdays with commercials); 90 minutes (Saturdays with commercials); 60 minutes (Sundays with commercials)	Everyday	7:00am	Savannah Guthrie, Hoda Kotb, Al Roker, Craig Melvin, Carson Daly, Sheinelle Jones, Dylan Dreyer, and Jenna Bush Hager (Weekdays); Peter Alexander, Laura Jarrett, and Joe Fryer for Saturdays and Willie Geist for Sundays (Weekends)	January 14, 1952
Scripps News	Early Rush	60 minutes (with commercials)	Weekdays	6:00am ET/3:00am PT	Jay Strubberg	N/A
Telemundo	Hoy Día (Spanish for Today)	3 hours (weekdays with commercials)	Weekdays	N/A	Karla Martínez, Satcha Pretto, Alan Tacher, Francisca Lachapel, Maity Interiano, Raúl González, and Ana María Canseco	February 15, 2021
Univision	¡Despierta América! (Spanish for Wake Up America!)	4 hours (Eastern time with commercials) 3 hours (Central time with commercials)	Weekdays	7:00am ET/4:00am PT	Jorge Ramos (Weekdays); Ilia Calderón (Weekends)	April 14, 1997
Cable/Satellite
BBC News	Newsday	90 minutes	Weekdays	23:00 GMT/BST	Babita Sharma and Kasia Madera in London, and Sharanjit Leyl in Singapore	June 13, 2011
BBC News	BBC News	3 (weekdays); 5 (weekends); 30 minutes	Daily	4:00am ET/1:00am PT	various	1995
BBC News	BBC News Now	2 hours & 30 minutes	Weekdays	7:00am ET/4:00am PT	Lucy Hockings, Maryam Moshiri	2023
C-SPAN	Washington Journal	3 hours (with commercials)	Everyday	7:00am ET/4:00am PT	Greta Wodele Brawner, Pedro Echevarria, Jesse J. Holland, John McArdle, Paul Orgel, Bill Scanlan, and Peter Slen	January 4, 1995
CNBC	Worldwide Exchange	60 minutes (with commercials)	Weekdays	5:00am ET/2:00am PT	Brian Sullivan	December 19, 2005
CNBC	Squawk Box	3 hours (with commercials)	Weekdays	6:00am ET/3:00am PT	Joe Kernen, Becky Quick, and Andrew Ross Sorkin	August 7, 1995
CNN	Early Start with Rahel Solomon	60 minutes (with commercials)	Weekdays	5:00am ET/2:00am PT	Rahel Solomon	March 10, 2025
CNN	CNN This Morning with Audie Cornish	60 minutes (with commercials)	Weekdays	6:00am ET/3:00am PT	Audie Cornish	February 26, 2024
CNN	CNN This Morning Weekend	2 hour (with commercials)	Weekends	6:00am ET/3:00am PT	Victor Blackwell	November 5, 2022
Fox Business Network	Mornings with Maria	3 hours (with commercials)	Weekdays	6:00am ET/3:00am PT	Maria Bartiromo	June 1, 2015
Fox News	Fox & Friends First	2 hours (with commercials)	Weekdays	4:00am ET/1:00am PT	Carley Shimkus and Todd Piro	March 5, 2012
Fox News	Fox & Friends	3 hours (Weekdays with commercials); 4 hours (Weekends with commercials)	Everyday	6:00am ET/3:00 am PT	Steve Doocy, Ainsley Earhardt, Brian Kilmeade, Janice Dean, and Carley Shimkus (weekdays); Rachel Campos-Duffy, Will Cain, and Rick Reichmuth (weekends)	February 1, 1998
MSNBC	Way Too Early	60 minutes (with commercials)	Weekdays	5:00am ET/2:00am PT	Ali Vitali	July 27, 2009
MSNBC	Morning Joe	4 hours (with commercials)	Weekdays	6:00am ET/3:00am PT	Joe Scarborough, Mika Brzezinski, Willie Geist and Jonathan Lemire	April 9, 2007
MSNBC	The Weekend	3 hours (with commercials)	Weekends	7:00am ET/4:00am PT	Jonathan Capehart, Eugene Daniels, and Jacqueline Alemany	January 13, 2024
NewsNation	Morning in America	3 hours (with commercials)	Weekdays	7:00am ET/4:00am PT	Adrienne Bankert	September 27, 2021
The Weather Channel	America's Morning Headquarters	6 hours (with commercials)	Everyday	6:00am ET/3:00am PT	Stephanie Abrams, Jim Cantore, Jordan Steele, Jen Carfagno, and Alex Wallace (Weekdays); Reynolds Wolf and Kelly Cass (Weekends)	January 3, 2000
Cable/Satellite (Sports)
CBSSN	Boomer and Gio	4 hours (with commercials)	Weekdays	6:00am ET/3:00am PT	Boomer Esiason and Gregg Giannotti	September 4, 2007
ESPN	Get Up!	2 hours (with commercials)	Weekdays	8:00am ET/5:00am PT	Mike Greenberg	April 2, 2018
ESPN	SportsCenter: AM	60 minutes (Weekdays with commercials); 5 hours (Saturdays with commercials); 2 hours (Sundays with commercials)	Everyday	7:00am ET/4:00am PT	See: List of SportsCenter anchors and reporters	September 7, 1979
ESPN2	SportsCenter: AM	60 minutes (Weekdays with commercials); 5 hours (Saturdays with commercials); 2 hours (Sundays with commercials)	Everyday	7:00am ET/4:00am PT	See: List of SportsCenter anchors and reporters	September 7, 1979
Fox Sports 1	Breakfast Ball	2 hours (with commercials)	Weekdays	8:00am ET/5:00am PT	Craig Carton, Danny Parkins, Mark Schlereth	August 26, 2024
NFL Network	Good Morning Football	3 hours (with commercials)	Everyday	7:00am ET/4:00am PT	Kay Adams, Kyle Brandt, and Peter Schrager (Weekdays); Colleen Wolfe (Weekends)	August 1, 2016

== Former ==
=== Broadcast networks ===
==== CBS ====
- CBS This Morning (November 30, 1987 – October 29, 1999 as the first incarnation and January 9, 2012 – September 6, 2021 as the second incarnation; replaced with CBS Mornings, CBS Saturday Morning, and CBS News Sunday Morning)
- The Early Show (November 1, 1999 – January 7, 2012)

=== Cable/satellite ===
==== BBC World News ====
- GMT (February 1, 2010 – November 1, 2019)
- World News Today (July 3, 2006 – January 31, 2010)

==== CNN ====
- American Morning (September 12, 2001 – December 30, 2011)
- CNN This Morning (November 1, 2022 – February 23, 2024; canceled due to poor ratings)
- New Day (June 17, 2013 – October 31, 2022; replaced with CNN This Morning)
- Starting Point (January 2, 2012 – March 29, 2013; cancelled due to poor ratings of the show and replaced with New Day)

==== HLN ====
- Morning Express with Robin Meade (2005 – December 5, 2022; replaced with CNN This Morning simulcast)

== Notes ==
- ^{d} Times may vary by their stations.
