= Mucho Mucho Amor: The Legend of Walter Mercado =

2020 documentary film of the life of Walter Mercado

- Documentary's Netflix poster
- Directed by: Cristina Costantini; Kareem Tabsch
- Produced by: Alex Fumero; Kayla Malahiazar (co-producer); Executive: Darren Foster; Jeffrey Plunkett; Lisa Leingang; Mona Panchal
- Starring: Walter Mercado
- Cinematography: Peter Alton
- Edited by: Tom Maroney
- Music by: Jeff Morrow
- Production companies: Muck Media; Key Rat, Inc.; Topic Studios; XTR
- Distributed by: Netflix
- Release dates: January 2020 (Sundance); July 8, 2020 (United States)
- Running time: 96 minutes
- Country: United States
- Languages: English; Spanish

Mucho Mucho Amor: The Legend of Walter Mercado is a 2020 documentary film about the life and career of Walter Mercado, one of the most influential and important astrologers in Latin America and the world. The documentary, directed by Cristina Costantini and Kareem Tabsch, features interviews with Mercado himself, his assistant Willy Acosta, the Mercado Salinas family, among many other public figures of Latino entertainment and television. The film premiered at the 2020 Sundance Film Festival and was released on Netflix on July 8, 2020.

== Synopsis ==
The documentary accounts Walter Mercado's early life as a gifted child in Puerto Rico in the 1930s, living in a rural area of sugar cane plantations with his family. While his brother, Henry, was away working with their father, Walter stayed at home with his mother, where he played piano and read books, inspiring himself to become a creative person. During his time as a student of the University of Puerto Rico in the 1950s, he began dancing and acting in theater, later moving on to acting roles in telenovelas. After a impromptu astrology segment in a TV show, requested by its producer Elín Ortiz, Walter had his first big break on television as an astrologer, which would later on bring him his first TV show and rise to fame locally in Puerto Rico and then with international audiences, after Bill Bakula became his manager. Walter went on to perform his astrology segments and shows with elaborate costumes and capes, with flamboyant colors and styles. At the same time, he faced homophobia targeted at his flamboyant and androgynous image, leading many to question his sexuality, which he reluctantly declined to address during his lifetime.

At one point in his life, Walter was also involved in the Psychic Friends Network telephone hotline. His career took a turn when Walter signed an overlooked contract that gave away the rights to his name, likeness, image, printed works and media, both past and future, over to Bill Bakula's company, which cost Mercado a six-year legal battle to win back, dissolving their professional relationship. After winning back the rights to use his own name, Walter suffered a heart attack from the stress of his legal battle and had his last television appearance on October 3, 2006. Death, spiritualism and religions are themes that Walter discussed countlessly throughout his career, including reincarnation, life after death and theology.

With his nieces Ivonne and Betty, and his assistant Willy, Walter visits the historic Teatro La Perla, in Ponce, reminiscing about the many theater productions he starred in. Back in San Juan, Walter is visited by Lin-Manuel Miranda and his father Luis, both long-time admirers of Mercado, when Hamilton was premiering in Puerto Rico in January 2019. After Miranda posted a photo of him and Mercado on his social media accounts, many long-time Walter Mercado fans were surprised after learning he was still alive, even after years out of the public eye. Walter's fame became a relevant cult-following among millennials, spawning memes, pop art, clothing and drinks with his name or image.

In May 2019, the HistoryMiami Museum invited Walter to an exhibition celebrating his life and honoring his fifty-year professional career as an astrologer. After a professional photoshoot for the exhibition and one week before opening night, Walter fell out of his bed and then slipped and fell in his bathroom, fracturing a rib and part of the dorsal vertebrae of his spine. However, he quickly recovers and is able to travel to Miami with his family to participate in a press junket and promote the exhibition. On opening night, Walter is honored among his guests and fans in what would be his final public appearance, three months before his death. Walter Mercado died in San Juan, Puerto Rico on November 2, 2019.

The film ends with a dedication to the filmmakers' grandmothers and all grandmothers in the world.

== Featured interviews ==
- Walter Mercado, astrologer
- Lin-Manuel Miranda, actor and playwright
- Eugenio Derbez, actor
- Willy Acosta, Walter's longtime assistant
- Raúl De Molina, host of El Gordo y La Flaca
- Nydia Caro, singer
- Ivonne Benet Mercado, Walter's niece
- Betty Benet Mercado, Walter's niece
- Dannette Benet Mercado, Walter's niece
- Aida "Bibi" Benet Mercado, Walter's niece
- Carmen Mercado, Walter's niece
- Charito Mercado, Walter's niece
- Jesse Mercado, Walter’s nephew-in-law
- Guillermo "Bill" Bakula, Walter's former manager
- Tony Hernández, radio producer
- María López Álvarez, creator of Primer Impacto
- Mireya Lucio, witch
- Karlo Karlo, LGBTQ activist
- Mauricio Zeilic, television host and Walter's colleague
- Jody Vialy, Walter's former publicist
- Carlos Velásquez, Walter's former attorney
- Wilma Torres, Walter's secretary
- Luis A. Miranda Jr., Lin-Manuel Miranda's father
- Curly Velásquez, actor and influencer
- María Gladys García, Curly's grandmother
- Matt Kuscher, owner of Stephen's Deli
- Bobby Gilardi, bartender of Ariete
- Jorge Ramos, journalist
- Runo, Walter's dog

=== Appearances via archival interviews ===
- Cristina Saralegui
- Sally Jessy Raphael
- Kelly Ripa and Anderson Cooper
- Howard Stern and Robin Quivers
- Regis Philbin and Kathie Lee Gifford
- Chris Spencer
- Don Francisco
- Vicki Lawrence
- Luisito Vigoreaux

== Reception ==
Mucho Mucho Amor: The Legend of Walter Mercado premiered at the 2020 Sundance Film Festival, and was released on July 8, 2020, on Netflix. The film holds a 100% approval rating on Rotten Tomatoes, based on 63 reviews with an average rating of 7.8/10. The website's critics consensus reads: "An absorbing and affectionate tribute to a unique individual, Mucho Mucho Amor should prove fascinating for Walter Mercado fans as well as first-timers." Stephanie Zacharek of Time said the film is a "delightful and open-hearted documentary".

=== Accolades ===
| Year | Award | Category | Result | Ref. |
|---|---|---|---|---|
| 2020 | NALIP Latino Media Fest | Best Latinx Film | Won | |
| 2021 | 32nd GLAAD Media Awards | GLAAD Media Award for Outstanding Documentary | Nominated | |

The film qualified for eligibility for nomination for the 93rd Academy Awards in the category of Best Documentary Feature.

Official selection of:

- 2020 Sundance Film Festival
- 2020 SxSW Film Festival
- 2020 True/False Film Festival
- 2020 Full Frame Documentary Film Festival
- 2020 Hot Docs Canadian International Documentary Festival
- 2020 Miami International Film Festival
- 2020 Guadalajara International Film Festival
- 2020 Sun Valley Film Festival
- 2020 Ambulante Film Festival
- 2020 San Diego Latino Film Festival
- 2020 Seattle International Film Festival
- 2020 Frameline Film Festival
