= Natalia Cruz =

Colombian-American journalist and actress

Natalia Andrea
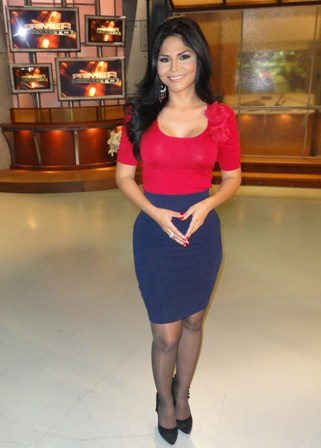
- Natalia on Univision
- Born: Natalia Andrea Rodriguez; August 18, 1976 (age 49); Barranquilla, Colombia
- Other name: Natalia Rodriguez
- Education: Universidad del Norte
- Occupation: Television journalist Actress
- Years active: 1993 – Present
- Employer: Mega TV
- Known for: MegaNews "Esta Es Tu Casa"; Primer Impacto; WNJU
- Awards: 3 Emmy Award; ACE Award; NY Latin Award
- Website: http://www.nataliandreatv.com

Natalia Andrea (born August 18, 1976, in Barranquilla, Colombia) is a Colombian journalist and news anchor in the United States, three time Emmy Award winner, news anchor for "Mega News" on Mega TV and "TV Realtor" at Real Estate TV show "Esta Es Tu Casa" on Mega TV network, previously affiliated to Univision Network, and the show Primer Impacto.

== Biography ==
Born to journalist parents, Natalia Andrea always had a passion for written works. In her youth she competed in writing contests. She won speech and poetry competitions as well as literature prizes.

Natalia attended Universidad del Norte, in Barranquilla, Colombia where she majored in social communications and journalism. While studying, she worked in news radio on "Emisora Atlantico", Cruz began her broadcasting career at 17 as news anchor for the newscast "CV Noticias" on the regional television station Telecaribe.

Manuel Teodoro gave Natalia her first exposure on national Colombian TV, as news anchor and reporter on the TV Magazine "Extra" on Caracol Television.

In early 2000, Natalia moved to New York and worked for Spanish language Public TV on HITN (Hispanic Information and Telecommunications Network), where she also produced the shows "Corriente Cultural" and "NotiCultura".

Later that year, she started as the New York City reporter for the daily morning show "Despierta America", on Univision, and did live shots for the longest-running variety TV show in the world, "Sabado Gigante".

In 2001, Natalia was hired by the New York Telemundo affiliate WNJU as a reporter for Noticiero 47. With only one month on the job, she covered the WTC terrorist attacks, being one of the first reporters on the scene at Ground Zero. Her work was noted in the book, "Running Toward Danger: Stories Behind the Breaking News of September 11", and she was featured on the 9/11 Tenth year exhibit on the Newseum on Washington, D.C.

After just 18 months working as a morning reporter, Cruz became news anchor on WNJU, now part of NBC, and received the 2004 Emmy Award as Best News Anchor for Tri-State area (NY, NJ, and CT).

She was nominated the following year for five awards, winning another Emmy Award, this time for Best Newscast in 2005. Additionally, Natalia won the ACE Award as Best News Anchor in 2005. 2006 saw Cruz win her third Emmy Award for Best Series of Social Interest.

Natalia then started as New York correspondent for "En Vivo y Directo", on TeleFutura. Only two months later, she was brought to "Primer Impacto" on Univision Network. She won the NY Latin Award for Best National Correspondent in 2008.

Natalia transferred to Miami in 2010 and has continued as a correspondent. Cruz often sits in as news anchor for shows at Univision, such as "Primer Impacto", "Despierta América", "Al Punto" and "Desayuno Alegre". She also briefs on "Noticiero Univision". and "Noticias Al Minuto" on TeleFutura.

In July 2011, Cruz was promoted to Anchor for Primer Impacto Extra, broadcast on the weekends at 5 pm / 4 pm center; replacing Weekend Anchor Satcha Pretto who left the program to become the new News Anchor for Despierta America instead of Neida Sandoval.

In 2012, Natalia hosted "Es el momento" Special "Primeros pasos hacia el éxito", Highlighting the Importance of Early Childhood Education; recorded at The White House featured artist Shakira and U.S. Secretary of Education Arne Duncan among other experts. In March 2013 she conducted from the studios, Univision's first time ever live broadcast of Easter Mass from Vatican City celebrated by Pope Francis.

In July 2016, she was appointed anchor for the TV show "Lo Mejor de Primer Impacto", Sundays at 5 pm / 4 pm Center on Univision. She continued at Univision until May 2018, after 12 years with the network.

Starting in December 2018 is the news anchor for "Mega News- Edición de la Tarde" at 5:30 pm (EST) / 2:30 pm (PST) on Mega TV in addition to host and executive producer of the Hispanic Real Estate TV show "Esta Es Tu Casa" on weekends at Mega TV. The schedule for MegaNews with Natalia Cruz was expanded to an hour, starting at 5 pm (EST) / 2 pm (PST) since April 29, 2019.

== Career ==
Television

Year	Program	Station	City	Title
2018–present	Mega News	Mega TV	Miami, FL (USA)	News Anchor - 5:00 pm
2018–present	Esta Es Tu Casa	Mega TV	Miami, FL (USA)	Host & Executive Producer
2011–2018	Primer Impacto Extra	Univision	Miami, FL (USA)	News Anchor - Weekends
2010–2011	Primer Impacto	Univision	Miami, FL (USA)	Staff Correspondent
2006–2010	Primer Impacto	Univision	New York, NY (USA)	New York Correspondent
2006	En Vivo y Directo	Telefutura	New York, NY (USA)	New York Correspondent
2002–2005	Noticiero 47	Telemundo	Fort Lee, NJ (USA)	News Anchor - 6 pm and 11 pm
2001–2002	Noticiero 47	Telemundo	Teterboro, NJ (USA)	News Reporter - 5 am to 7 am
2000–2001	Despierta América	Univision	New York, NY (USA)	New York Reporter
2000–2001	Sabado Gigante	Univision	New York, NY (USA)	New York Reporter
2000	Corriente Cultural	HITN-TV	New York, NY (USA)	Host and Producer
1999–2000	Extra	Caracol	Bogotá (Col)	News Anchor and News Reporter
1997–1999	En Línea	Telecaribe	Barranquilla (Col)	Co-Host
1994–1996	CV Noticias	Telecaribe	Barranquilla (Col)	News Anchor - 8:30 pm

Radio

Year	Program	Dial	Station	City	Title
1994–1999	Jazz Vespertino	103.1 FM	Uninorte FM Stereo	Barranquilla (Col)	Host
1997–1998	La Vallenata	90.1 FM	Caracol Radio	Barranquilla (Col)	News Reader
1997–1998	Corazón Stereo	97.6 FM	Caracol Radio	Barranquilla (Col)	Programming Director
1993–1994	Atlántico en Noticias	1070 AM	Emisora Atlántico	Barranquilla (Col)	News Reader

== Awards ==
- "Latino Show Awards" for her career trajectory on journalism. Medellin, Colombia, October 25th, 2017.
- Award "Premio Estrellas Digitales" as News anchor Influencer of the year 2017. Coral Gables, June 9, 2017.
- Award "Angel de Impacto 2016" on Pasarela Angels of the Happy Family Foundation. Miami, October 1st 2016.
- Award "Mujer de Inspiración 2016" by 'Perla de Esperanza' Foundation. June 2016.
- Acknowledgment by "Latino Show Magazine" for her outstanding career and work with the Latino community in the United States, and for her 10 years of leadership with the TV show 'Primer Impacto'. April 2016.
- Jury at "Premio Águila" 2015, 2016 & 2017, first and only international award for Hispanic media on the Christian industry.
- Award "Congo de Oro" by Carnaval de Barranquilla Internacional to Best Report 2015, given at Calle 8 Festival in Miami on March 13, 2016.
- "National Godmother" at the Colombian Parade of New York in July 2015.
- "Premio Colombia 2013" The Maximum award for Colombians abroad, because of their personal values and services to the international community. Miami (Nov 23rd, 2013)
- "Guest of honor" at the Bicentennial of Barranquilla by the Major Office of Barranquilla City. 2013
- One of the 13 "Top Real Women in Fashion 2012"
- One of the 19 "Most fashionable people of 2011" in Miami
- Featured on the 9/11 Tenth year exhibit on the Newseum on Washington, D.C., 2011
- New York Latin Award 2008 as best national TV reporter.
- Emmy Award 2006 from the National Academy of Television Arts and Sciences, for her special investigation "Lead on Kids Jewelry" on the category series of social interest.
- ACE Award 2005 from the Association of Latin Entertainment Critics as best TV Host.
- Emmy Award winner for Best Newscast in 2005.
- 5 Nominations to Emmy Award 2005 including one as second consecutive year as best News Anchor/Host, Best Political Segment, Best Special Coverage, and two for best Newscast.
- Emmy Award 2004 from the National Academy of Television Arts and Sciences as best News Anchor/Host.
- Emmy Award nominee for Best Newscast in 2004.
- "Nemqueteba" Prize 2004 by Colombians Breaking Barriers, on the Symposium "Promoting the development of the Latin Community" in recognition for her work in favor of the improvement of the Hispanic community in United States of America.
- Honor of Merit 2004 by Colombian Civic Center, in recognition for her dedication and support to the Hispanic community.
- Latino Community Leadership Award 2004 by Bergen Community College.
- Nomination to ACE Award 2003 by Association of Latin Entertainment Critics as best News Anchor / Host.
- Nomination to ACE Award 2002 by Association of Latin Entertainment Critics as best News Reporter.
- Honor of Merit 2001 by NJ Hispanic-American Parade for her covering on September 11 attacks.
- Volunteer promoter of ONG's campaigns such as Red Cross, World Vision and Children International.
- Several times Godmother of Latin festivals, including: NY Colombian Independence Festival, NY Colombian Parade, Hispanic Parade of New York, Hispanic Parade of New Jersey, Hispanic Parade of Bayonne, NY Puerto Rican Parade, NY Dominican Parade, Cali Fair of Elizabeth.
- Master of ceremonies for events and community forums in New York, New Jersey, Florida and Washington DC
