= Cadile =

Cadile is a surname. Notable people with the surname include:

- Gustavo Cadile (born 1969), Argentine fashion designer
- Jim Cadile (born 1940), American football player
