= Maria Lopez Alvarez =

- Occupation: Television Producer
- Years active: 1983-Present
- Known for: Starting Nuestra Belleza Latina, Primer Impacto, El Gordo y la Flaca, Un Nuevo Día, and “¡Qué Noche! con Angélica y Raúl”

Maria Lopez Alvarez is a Cuban-American businesswoman and television executive. She has developed entertainment programs for Univision and Telemundo.

== Education ==
In 1983, Lopez Alvarez graduated from the University of Miami with a Bachelor of Arts degree in Communications.

== Career ==
=== 1983-2011: Univision ===
Lopez Alvarez began her career at Univision in 1983, when she joined the company as Associate, and then News Producer, for WLTV 23 in Miami.

In 1991, as an Executive Producer for Univision, Lopez Alvarez launched the first daily news magazine program, Noticias y Más, which evolved the following year into Primer Impacto, a hybrid of news and entertainment on a national level. She subsequently developed primetime (1995) and weekend (2001) editions.

In 2002, Lopez Alvarez became Vice President and Director of News/Entertainment for Univision Network, a position she held until 2010.

In this capacity she developed and oversaw the network’s daily entertainment news show El Gordo y La Flaca, the first and longest-running daily gossip show.

In 2008, Lopez Alvarez was named one of the most influential figures in the entertainment industry by People en Espanol.

In 2007, Lopez Alvarez launched Nuestra Belleza Latina, a reality competition program, now currently in its 10th season.

In 2010, Lopez Alvarez was made Vice President of Alternative Programming and Vertical Platforms, where she developed and implemented new shows and business plans across all vertical assets of the company, including the television networks Univision, TeleFutura, and Galavisión, as well as Univision Radio, Univision Móvil, and Univision Interactive Media.

=== 2012-2016: Telemundo ===
In 2012, shortly after leaving Univision Lopez Alvarez was hired by rival network Telemundo, and was named Senior Vice President of Alternative Programming. In that same year, she was named one of the most powerful women by People en Espanol.

From 2012 to 2014, Lopez Alvarez re-organized and restructured Telemundo's morning show, Un Nuevo Día (formerly ¡Levántate!), by rebranding. It won two years in a row the Emmy Award for outstanding morning program in Spanish.

In 2014, she was named Senior Vice President of Reality Programming and Specials. She supervised all of Telemundo's reality productions, including the network's singing competition La Voz Kids, and Top Chef Estrellas, the primetime culinary competition series.

In 2015, Lopez Alvarez developed and produced ¡Qué Noche! con Angélica y Raúl, Telemundo’s first Saturday Night variety show.
