= Chasing Papi =

2003 film by Linda Mendoza

- Theatrical release poster
- Directed by: Linda Mendoza
- Written by: Laura Angelica Simon; Steve Antin; Alison Balian; Elizabeth Sarnoff
- Produced by: Laura Angelica Simon; Tracey Trench; Forest Whitaker
- Starring: Roselyn Sánchez; Sofía Vergara; Jaci Velasquez; Eduardo Verástegui; Lisa Vidal; D.L. Hughley; Freddy Rodríguez
- Cinematography: Xavier Pérez Grobet
- Edited by: Maysie Hoy
- Music by: Emilio Estefan
- Production companies: Robert Simonds Productions; Spirit Dance Entertainment; Fox 2000 Pictures
- Distributed by: 20th Century Fox
- Release date: April 16, 2003
- Running time: 80 minutes
- Country: United States
- Languages: English; Spanish
- Budget: $9 million
- Box office: $12.6 million

Chasing Papi is a 2003 American comedy film directed by Linda Mendoza (in her feature film directorial debut) and starring Roselyn Sánchez, Sofía Vergara, Jaci Velasquez, and Eduardo Verástegui. The women discover that their boyfriend has been dating all three of them at the same time—a discovery that leads them on an adventure throughout Los Angeles, California.

== Plot ==
Tomás Fuentes works for a marketing group in Los Angeles and constantly travels to visit his three girlfriends. Cici, a cocktail waitress from Miami; Patricia Sofia Ordonez Coronado del Pescador, a debutante of New York's high society; and Lorena Morales, a lawyer from Chicago; have fallen for Tomás and given him the nickname "Papi". This situation, however, starts affecting Tomás's work life, causing him to pass out during a presentation. Tomás's doctor tells him to choose a woman and prescribes tranquilizers.

Meanwhile, Tomás's three girlfriends go to his house after hearing their horoscopes read by a fortune teller. Instead of fighting each other, they agree to leave and quit Tomás as revenge for his cheating on them. Tomás later arrives and takes his tranquilizers with alcohol. The girls each have second thoughts about leaving and return to confront Tomás directly. First Lorena, then Patricia and finally Cici, causing Tomás to overdose on alcohol and tranquilizers and pass out.

Outside Tomás' house, FBI agent Carmen Rivera, is waiting. She has been following Cici as part of an investigation. Fala, Cici's business partner, had Cici do her boyfriend, Ricky, a favor by taking a car that he sold online to the buyer in Los Angeles. Ricky is involved in the Whittaker counterfeit ring that Rivera is investigating. The girls spot her.

Scared by Rivera's firearm, the girls decide to take Tomás out of the house. They load their bags in Ricky's car and decide to stay at a hotel. However, Patricia's credit cards have been canceled by her mother. Meanwhile, the Miss Latina American Beauty Pageant is being held in the hotel and Miss Puerto Rico's flight was delayed. Lorena looks like Miss Puerto Rico and takes her place. Cici passes herself and Patricia off as her staff. When moving their luggage to Miss Puerto Rico's room, a bag falls off the cart.

The next morning, Lorena has to meet the judges and Cici has to deliver Ricky's car to Rodrigo, a man who apparently bought it. They leave Tomás, who is later taken by Rivera; she has followed them to the hotel. It turns out that Rodrigo was not interested in the car but a bag that was supposed to be in the trunk. Upon returning to the hotel with Rodrigo's associate, Victor, the girls discover a note that reads, "If you want your Papi back, bring the money to the Don Quixote puppet at L.A. Latin festival at 5 PM. No cops."

Patricia knocks Victor out with a lamp. The girls are later interrupted by the pageant's director, who needs Lorena to meet with the judges. Patricia finds the missing bag in the luggage room.

During Lorena's interview, Patricia and Cici arrive but so does the real Miss Puerto Rico, who outs Lorena as an impostor. The three girls escape. Tomás wakes up in Rivera's car. Rivera intends to use him and the girls to detain Victor and Rodrigo. They follow the girls to the festival as they leave in Ricky's car.

En route, the girls' car breaks down. They steal a motorcycle and eventually lose Rivera. Upon arrival, the girls see the puppet behind the stage. Victor and Rodrigo spot the girls, who run on stage, where Sheila E. is performing and dance to a song. When Victor and Rodrigo get closer to the stage, the girls flee mid-performance. They all run to the puppet, where Rivera and other agents surround them, apprehending Victor and Rodrigo. Tomás apologizes to his girlfriends for deceiving them, but they choose to leave him. Tomás decides to take Rivera out for dinner. The girls are later invited to return to the stage, where they dance.

Five months later, the girls have kept in touch. Patricia has moved into her own apartment with her dog Fifi and now works at an art gallery. Cici is an entertainer on a cruise liner with her business partner Fala. Lorena becomes the self-proclaimed "Queen of Tango". Fifi hears her horoscope that advises her to "go outside (...), because love is waiting for [her]." Fifi complies and finds her "Puppy Chulo."

== Cast ==
- Roselyn Sánchez as Lorena
- Sofía Vergara as Cici
- Jaci Velasquez as Patricia
- Eduardo Verástegui as Tomás "Papi" Fuentes
- Lisa Vidal as Carmen
- Freddy Rodríguez as Victor
- D.L. Hughley as Rodrigo
- María Conchita Alonso as Maria
- Walter Mercado as Himself
- Carlos Ponce as Himself
- Joy Enriquez as Mary
- Ian Gomez as Dr. Chu
- Diana-Maria Riva as Fala (credited as Diana Maria Riva)
- Ivette Sosa as Gloria
- Bárbara Bermudo as Miami TV Reporter
- Gina Ravera as Beauty Pageant Judge

=== Cameos and appearances ===
The movie features several cameo appearances, including singer Carlos Ponce and Primer Impacto news reporter Bárbara Bermudo.

Other entertainers who act in the film include the lead singer of the Pussycat Dolls, Nicole Scherzinger and her fellow ex-Eden's Crush member Ivette Sosa, and María Conchita Alonso.

== Critical response ==
Critics gave generally negative reviews of Chasing Papi. Rotten Tomatoes gave it a rating of 15% based on 48 reviews. On Metacritic, it has a score of 33% based on reviews from 23 critics, indicating "generally unfavorable" reviews.

Elizabeth Weitzman from the New York Daily News wrote "The credits on this film are genuinely impressive: Each of the talented actresses is already a popular Latina star, and the film was produced by Forest Whitaker, who directed Waiting to Exhale. No doubt he expected it to speak to an underrecognized audience in the way that one did. Instead, it just speaks down to them and the rest of us."

Lael Loewenstein of Variety criticized the film for having "[a] relatively predictable twists of fate and deus ex machina contrivances [that] don't hold up under scrutiny", adding that "it's better to accept them as part of the film's zany comic universe and not ask questions".
