= Ana María Canseco =

Morning television co-host

Ana Maria Canseco
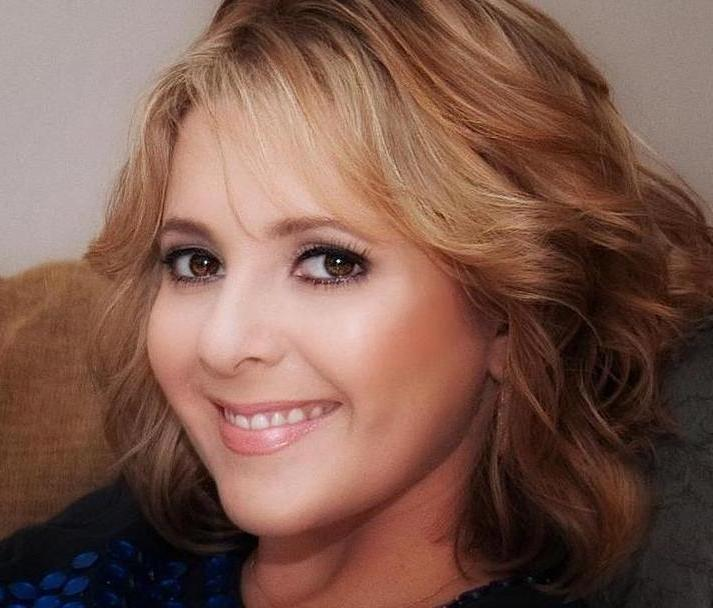
- Born: September 5, 1967 (age 58); Mexico City, Mexico
- Occupation: Television Personality
- Years active: 1997–present

Rocío Ana Maria Canseco (born September 5, 1967) is a Mexican television personality living in the United States. Canseco is the co-host of the Univision morning talk show, Despierta América. She also served as a guest host on the network's afternoon talk show El Gordo y La Flaca. As of 2010, Canseco appeared on Despierta América for 13 years, until October 21, 2010, when it was announced that she will no longer be a part of the television show. In September 2013, Canseco was a co-host of the Telemundo morning show Un Nuevo Día, until her last day on April 6, 2018. As of Valentine’s Day of 2020, she returned as a co-host of the Despierta América.

== Career ==
Rocío Ana María Canseco began her career as a television reporter/anchor in Texas and debuted as an actress in the telenovela, Mundo de Juguete, in an uncredited role.

In 1997, Canseco became one of the original co-hosts of Despierta América in 1997. It is the number-one rated Spanish language morning show and she has starred on it since its debut.

On May 3, 2002, Canseco acted as master of ceremonies for a Cinco de Mayo celebration at the East Room with President George W. Bush, presiding, and First Lady Laura Bush in attendance. This was her first visit to the White House.

In 2002, Canseco and Star Jones were selected by Payless ShoeSource to be spokeswomen for its South America marketing effort.

On December 13, 2005, Canseco and Raúl De Molina announced the nominations for the upcoming 2006 Premio Lo Nuestro awards show. Canseco said that the 2005 program was seen by more than nine million people and one of Univision's highest ranked specials.

On August 7, 2008, Canseco hosted the 4th annual Los Premios de Texas Latin Music Awards at the Joe and Theresa Long Center for Performing Arts in Austin, Texas.

On October 21, 2010, she ceased to work on Despierta America, after 13 years of being a host on the show.

On Monday, September 9, 2013 she joined the cast of Telemundo's morning show Un Nuevo Día in Miami, Florida.

On Friday, March 27, 2018, she announced her departure on Un Nuevo Día, after 5 years of being a host on the show. Her last day was on Friday, April 6, 2018.

On Valentine’s Day of 2020, she returned to become a co-host of Univision’s morning show, Despierta América. She’s currently co-hosting.

== Advocacy ==
In 2006, Fernando Arau, Raúl González and Canseco were part of a Got Milk? campaign to help prevent obesity amongst Latinos. More than 33 percent suffer from this affliction and Canseco wore a milk mustache to promote a healthier lifestyle by "milking it up" in the morning.

Prior to the 2008 election, Canseco was featured in a public service announcement, called "Ve y Vota en las Primarias" or "Get Out and Vote in the Primaries".

In 2009, Canseco was the Master of Ceremonies for MALDEF's 25th Annual San Antonio Awards Gala which honored "community champions".

== Charitable work ==
Canseco lived with her grandmother in Mexico City and remembered the best gift her uncle Chacho sent from California each year at Christmas time as a Western Union MoneyGram. As a child, she did not realize that her uncle sent monthly support payments but knew then that Christmas money order meant a getting a gift like a doll for her. With an "economic crisis" in 2008, Canseco was scheduled on two nights in December to help give away two billion dollars to help others keep the same sentiment as the Christmas Day approached. On April 17, 2010, in a similar give-a-way, she documented the impact of wired transfers in Washington, D.C.

On January 23, 2010, Canseco was amongst more than 50 Univision personalities who solicited live donations for the "Unidos Por Haití"(United for Haiti) 2010 Haiti earthquake relief effort. The live show aired during Sábado Gigante.

== Red carpet ==
Canseco walked the 3rd Annual Premios Juventud red carpet, which is dyed blue, in 2006 along with other celebrities like RBD, Wisin & Yandel and Luny Tunes. She wore a white and bronze Nicole Miller gown.

In 2009, Canseco modeled a Gustavo Cadile dress on People en Español's "Los 50 Más Bellos 2009" in Spanish, or "The 50 Prettiest People in 2009", red carpet. Giselle Blondet, her former Despierta América castmate, wore vintage Michelle Nazar. On November 5, 2009, Canseco appeared at the 10th Annual Latin Grammy Awards in Las Vegas, Nevada.

== Awards ==
At the fourth annual "Women of Hope/Mujeres de la Esperanza" awards, Canseco was one of nine women to win this City of Hope award which recognizes US Hispanic women role models. María Elena Salinas, a Univision newscaster who Canseco has worked with, also won this same award.

In 2008, Canseco was selected as one of People en Español's "Los 50 Más Bellos"("The 50 Most Beautiful People") as well as Jackie Guerrido. She won this award again in 2009 and posed dressed as Greta Garbo.

== Personal life ==
Canseco was born in Mexico City. As of 2005, Canseco lives in Miami, Florida. She gets up at 4:30 a.m. every morning and goes to bed early because of her Un Nuevo Día duties. Canseco speaks Spanish and English. At the age of 12 she found out that the person she thought was her sister was actually her birth mother. In 2004, she became a U.S. citizen

== See also ==
- List of television presenters/Mexico

== Sources ==
- Univision Univision Retrieved: 2010-05-15.
- Despierta América Univision Retrieved: 2010-05-15.
