= The Morning News =

The Morning News may refer to:

== Television ==
- ITV Morning News, in the United Kingdom, former name of ITV News at 5:30
- Morning News (Canadian morning TV show), in Canada
- CBS Morning News, a half-hour daily television broadcast on the American TV network
- KTLA Morning News, an American morning television news program airing on KTLA
- WGN Morning News, an American morning television news program airing on WGN-TV
- The Morning News, Indian morning news television programme broadcast by CNN-News18

== Print media ==
- The Morning News (American newspaper), in Florence, South Carolina
- The Morning News (Bangladeshi newspaper), in Dhaka, Bangladesh
- Belfast Morning News
- The Dallas Morning News
- Savannah Morning News
- The Morning News, a predecessor of The News Journal, a newspaper in Delaware

== Other uses ==
- The Morning News (online magazine)
- "The Morning News" (song), a 2007 single by Chamillionaire

== See also ==
- Breakfast television
  - List of American network TV morning news programs
