= Raúl González (host) =

Venezuelan TV host and actor (born 1971)

Raúl González (born October 27, 1971) is a Venezuelan-American TV host and actor. Born in Caracas, Venezuela, he began his career acting in children's Popet theatre in his native Maracaibo. In his early twenties, he hosted kids' TV shows in Venezuela, as Chamocrópolis and Supercrópolis both along with Merci Mayorca. In 1994, he moved to Miami, Florida, where he eventually became one of the hosts on the popular morning show Despierta América, along with Fernando Arau, Ana Maria Canseco, and news anchor Neida Sandoval. In February 2014, after 13 years of co-hosting Univision's morning show Despierta America, he left the show to join the Telemundo network where he co-hosted with Angelica Vale the new variety show ¡Qué Noche!.

Raúl González returned to Despierta América as a co-host in March 2018.

== TV Shows Host ==
- Gran Opportunidad (Telemundo, 2017)
- ¡Qué Noche! (Telemundo, 2014–16)
- Miss Universe (Telemundo, 2014)
- Miss Teen USA (Xbox Live, 2014–15)
- Billboard Latin Music Awards (Telemundo, 2014)
- Un Nuevo Día (Telemundo, 2014–17)
- Despierta America (Univision, 2001–2014; 2018–present)
- Supercrópolis (RCTV, 1992–1994)
- Chamocrópolis (Televen)
