= Bárbara Bermudo =

Puerto Rican journalist

- Born: June 5, 1975 (age 50); Guaynabo, Puerto Rico
- Other name: Barbie
- Occupation: Journalist
- Years active: 2002–2017
- Spouse: Mario Andrés Moreno (m. 2008)
- Children: 3

Bárbara Bermudo (born June 5, 1975) is a Puerto Rican journalist and one of the eight cover subjects of the 2007 edition of People en Españols "50 Most Beautiful People".

== TV and film career ==
Bermudo, who was born in Guaynabo to Cuban parents, Bermudo has a degree in journalism from American University in Washington, D.C., was the host of Primer Impacto, a Spanish language news program which covers predominantly human interest stories and is popular among the Hispanic population in the United States, until she was laid off on January 5, 2017. Bermudo joined the program in 2002 when the show's original host María Celeste Arrarás had left and co-hosted it Myrka Dellanos until she left in 2004, and also with Fernando Del Rincón until he was let go in 2008.

Before Univision, Bermudo worked as a reporter for WAPA TV in 1997.

In 2003, Bermudo had a small role playing herself in the film Chasing Papi, starring Roselyn Sanchez, Jaci Velasquez, and Sofía Vergara.

In 2004 and 2005, Bermudo hosted Lo Que no vio de Premios lo Nuestro (What you didn't see in Lo Nuestro Awards) and Noche de Estrellas (The Night of Stars). Bermudo has made television appearances in El Show de Cristina, El Escandalo del Mediodia (The Midday Scandal), and Que Bodas (What a Wedding). She is one of the eight cover subjects of the 2007 edition of People en Español's "50 Most Beautiful People" issue.

In 2017, she received a Daytime Emmy Award nomination for Outstanding Daytime Talent in a Spanish Language Program for her work on Primer Impacto. She also won an Emmy for a report on the drug ecstasy.

== Fashion career ==
In 2013, Bermudo started CAMI, her own line of girls' and women's clothing, shoes, and accessories. The brand name is formed from combining her daughters' names (Camila and Mía).

== Advocacy ==
Bermudo is involved in public advocacy through philanthropy, social activism, volunteer work, and mentorship. She supports initiatives related to education, healthcare, and social justice, while using her platform to raise awareness of issues affecting marginalized communities. Additionally, she mentors young individuals and contributes to efforts aimed at amplifying underrepresented voices.

== Personal life ==
She married Mario Andrés Moreno, a journalist of Colombian descent in a Dade County courthouse and later had an elaborate wedding on November 29, 2008 in the Dominican Republic. In February 2009, Bermudo confirmed to "People en Español" that she was pregnant and on Friday, May 15, 2009, she gave birth to a girl named Mia Andrea. On Monday, October 18, 2010, she gave birth to her second daughter named Camila Andrea. On February 26, 2015 Bermudo announced she was expecting her 3rd child which was a girl on Univision's morning show Despierta America On August 1, 2015, she gave birth to Sofia Andrea Moreno.

== See also ==
- List of Puerto Ricans
- History of women in Puerto Rico
