= Luz María Doria =

Colombian writer and television producer

- Born: July 10, 1965 (age 61); Cartagena, Colombia
- Other name: LuzMa
- Occupations: Tv producer, writer, columnist, executive tv producer, author
- Years active: 1986–present

Luz Maria Doria (born in Cartagena, Colombia, July 10, 1965) is the author of the five books La Mujer de Mis Sueños ("The Woman of My Dreams"), Tu Momento Estelar ("your Shinning Moment"), El Arte de No Quedarte con las Ganas (The Art of not Staying with the Desire), La Mujer de mis sueños: 100 ideas de agradecimiento y superación ("The Woman of my Dreams: 100 notions of gratitude and self improvement"), and ¿Cuánto te Pesa lo que te Pasa? ("How Much does what happens weigh on you?"). She is vice-president and executive producer of the morning show Despierta America on the Spanish Network Univision. Also she writes a weekly column on Mondays for the Spanish newspaper La Opinión in Los Angeles and "El Diario de NY" in New York.

== Biography ==
Doria studied communication in Barry University in Miami Shores, Florida, where she graduated in 1986 and started her internship as a reporter for the Colombian newspaper "El Universal de Cartagena, Colombia". The same year she started working in Editorial America (now Editorial Televisa) as reporter of the Magazine Cosmopolitan and TV y Novelas USA under the management of Cristina Saralegui .

From 1991 to 2011 she was the Editor in chief of ''Cristina the magazine'' and in 1998 she was the editor of the book "Confidencias de una Rubia of Cristina Saralegui". In January 2002 she started working in Telefutura (now UniMás ) as executive producer of the entertainment show Escándalo TV and she was also part of the show ''La Tijera'' as executive producer until January 2012. In 2009 she was named entertainment director of Telefutura.

On January 30, 2012, she started working in ¡Despierta América! as executive producer, and in September 2013 was named vice president of univision.

In August 2014 she was on the cover of the magazine ''Negocios''. In March of that same year she was announced as one of the collaborators as columnist for the Magazine ''Siempre Mujer'' until the last issue of the magazine in November 2016.

she was part of the Women leadership council of Univision where she was in charge of the division in Miami. On June 30, 2016, she was invited to the last live show Cala of Ismael Cala on CNN en Español where she released her book ''La mujer de mis sueños'' (The Woman of my Dreams) being her first television interview ever.

In May 2017 she was the cover of the magazine "Latinus" which featured a special edition of the successful Latin women.

In 2001, the newspaper "El Tiempo" named her as one of the most successful journalists. In 2014, 2015, 2016, and 2017 she was nominated for a Daytime Emmy Award as executive producer of ¡Despierta América!. In March 2013 she was named Woman of the Year by the W.O.W (Women of the World) in recognizing her influence in the world of communications.

In 2018, after being nominated for the 5th time in a row, Despierta America won the Daytime Emmy Award making Doria the winner as Executive producer of the show.

In 2024 she was named one of the 25 most powerful women by the magazine People en Español making this the third time.
