= Laura Posada =

Puerto Rican philanthropist and writer

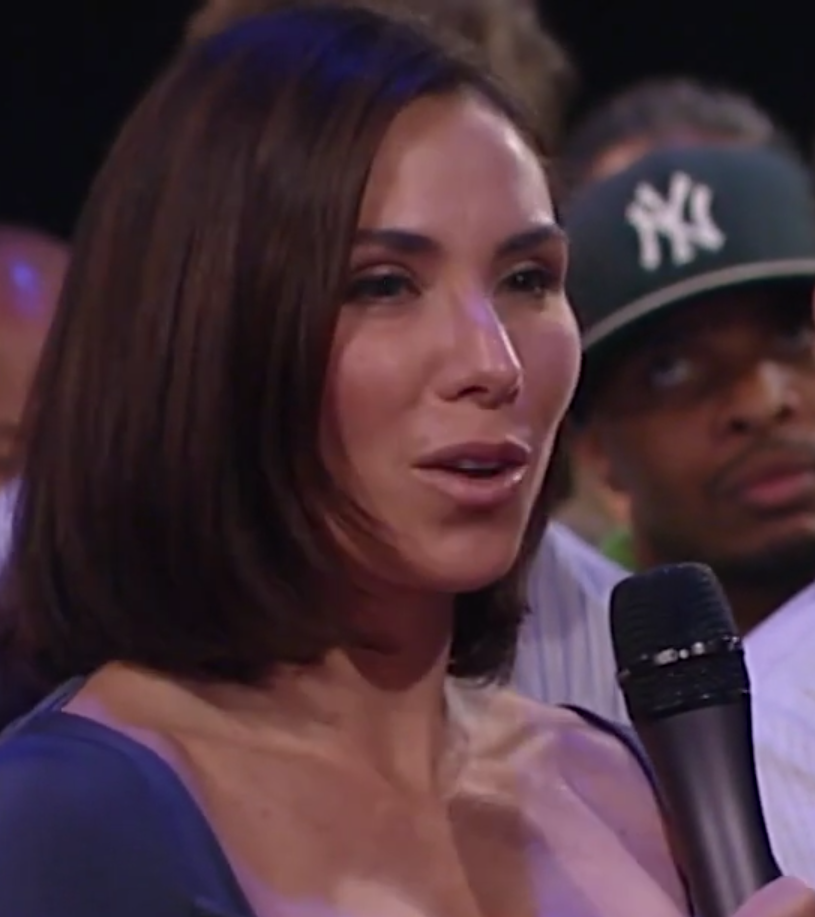
- Born: Laura Méndez; October 19, 1971 (age 53); San Juan, Puerto Rico
- Education: Loyola University New Orleans (BA, JD)
- Occupation: Philanthropist
- Spouse: Jorge Posada

Laura Posada (nee Méndez) (born October 19, 1971) is a Puerto Rican TV personality and philanthropist.

== Early life ==
Posada was born and raised in Puerto Rico. Posada graduated from Loyola University with a bachelor in Communications as well as juris doctor from Loyola Law School.

== Television career ==
Posada was a co-producer and host on Fox Life's show "Manual de Supervivencia" for two seasons. Previously, she was also a co-host on Fox Life's "Tu Vida Mas Simple," a daily show where she gave families advice on parenting and everyday issues. Currently, Posada appears on the TODAY Show on NBC to give life coaching tips. In addition, she makes weekly appearances on Univision's "Despierta America" as a lifestyle expert.

== Works ==
Moreover, Posada has co-authored two books with her husband, former New York Yankees catcher Jorge Posada "Fit Home Team: The Posada Family Guide to Health, Exercise, and Nutrition the Inexpensive and Simple Way," and "The Beauty of Love: A Memoir of Miracles, Hope, and Healing."

== Philanthropy ==
After Hurricane Maria struck Puerto Rico in September 2017. Posada and her husband founded a non-profit to bring aid to the devastated island. For those efforts, she and her husband were "godparents" of the Puerto Rican Day Parade held in New York in 2018.

== Personal life ==
Laura Posada married former New York Yankees star catcher Jorge Posada on January 21, 2000. Jorge Posada's then Yankees teammate Derek Jeter served as best man at the wedding. After their first-born son Jorge Luis was born with craniosynostosis, Laura and Jorge Posada established the Jorge Posada Foundation, which helps fund research for the condition and offers family support.

The couple has one other child, daughter Paulina.
