= Jackie Guerrido =

Puerto Rican journalist

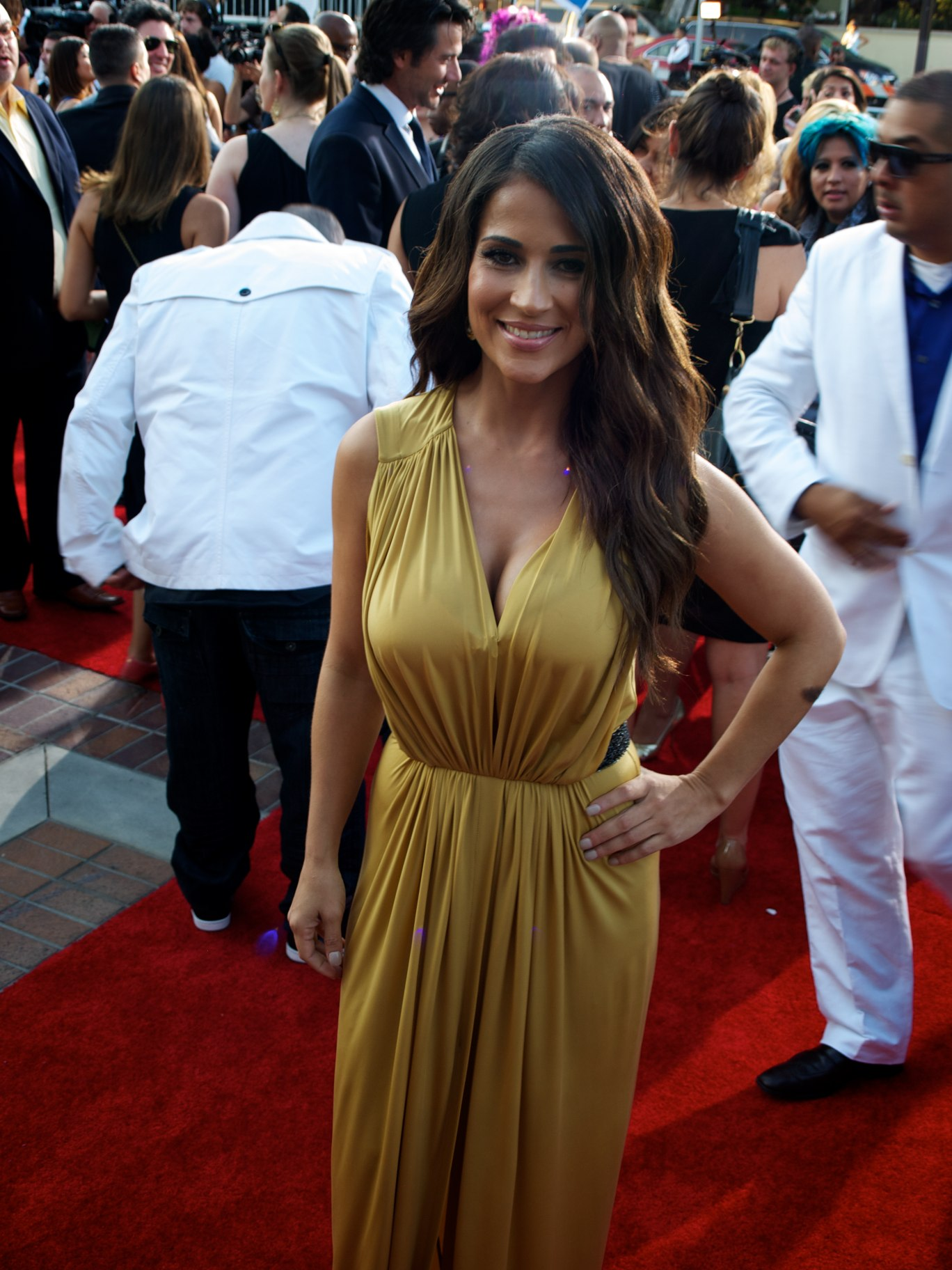
- Guerrido at the 2014 Alma Awards
- Born: September 24, 1972 (age 53); San Juan, Puerto Rico
- Occupations: Weather presenter and TV host
- Height: 5 ft 3 in (160 cm)
- Spouse: Don Omar (m. 2008; div. 2011)

Jackie Guerrido (born September 24, 1972) is a Puerto Rican television weather presenter and journalist for Primer Impacto on Univision. She also is a TV host for Despierta America en Domingo.

== Early years ==
Guerrido was born and raised in San Juan, Puerto Rico, where she received her primary and secondary education. According to Guerrido, her mother was mistreated by her father, therefore Guerrido and her sister had to seek shelter together with their mother at the Casa Protegida Julia de Burgos, a domestic violence shelter in San Juan, when she was seven years old. After graduating from high school, she moved with her family to The Bronx borough of New York City.

== Career ==
Before Guerrido worked in the media, she had shown interest in other areas of work.

Guerrido was offered a position on WSKQ's morning show, El Vacilon de la Mañana (Good times in the morning), by a producer who heard her doing a voice-over. She soon received an offer from WRMA (106.7) in Miami, which she accepted.

Guerrido settled down in Miami and she joined the HBC Radio Company, after working at Romance for a year. There she was given the opportunity to co-host a radio program with the duties of broadcasting news and traffic conditions. Eventually, she was given her own music show at WRTO (98.3). She also landed a job in television as a traffic reporter for WSCV, Miami's Telemundo affiliate, working for both the radio and television at the same time.

=== Weather forecaster ===
Univision took notice of Guerrido and made her an offer to become the weather presenter for Al Amanacer de Noticias 23 (Morning News at Channel 23), the then-morning show for Univision flagship WLTV. She studied meteorology at the University of Miami.

For several years, Guerrido presented the weather on Despierta America (Wake Up America), which is one of the most popular television programs among the Hispanic community in the United States. She also did the weather forecast for Univision's afternoon newsmagazine show Primer Impacto (First Impact) with Barbara Bermudo. She studied journalism at the University of Florida. As of January 9, 2017, she is co-anchor of Primer Impacto alongside Pamela Silva Conde, replacing longtime anchor Barbara Bermudo.

=== Mira Quien Baila! (2010) ===
In 2004, Guerrido was named the Good Will Ambassador for the Puerto Rican Day Parade celebrated in New York City. She is the mother of two teenagers, Thomas and Adieny. On April 19, 2008, Jackie married reggaeton singer Don Omar in Puerto Rico. In 2010, Guerrido participated in Mira Quien Baila!, a reality show, which aired on Univision in the United States and is the American/Spanish-Speaking version of Dancing with the Stars. The show's finale was on November 21, 2010 and Guerrido came in 2nd place, by popular vote, to Vadhir Derbez. Guerrido was awarded $10,000 (US) which she donated to the Casa Protegida Julia de Burgos, a domestic violence shelter.

=== Filmography ===
In 2014, Guerrido would portray the role of a detective in the movie AWOL-72.

Film
Year	Title	Role	Notes
2015	AWOL-72	Rose	Direct-to-video

== See also ==
- List of Puerto Ricans
