= Un Nuevo Día =

Spanish language television morning show

- Also known as: ¡Levántate!
- Genre: Morning show
- Presented by: Ana María Canseco; Daniel Sarcos; Adamari López; Rashel Diaz; James Tahhan; Janice Bencosme; Erika Csiszer
- Country of origin: United States
- Original language: Spanish

Production
- Executive producer: Mari Garcia-Marquez
- Producer: Johan Gonzales
- Production locations: Miami, Florida

Original release
- Network: Telemundo
- Release: November 26, 2008 – February 12, 2021

Un Nuevo Día (A New Day) is an American television morning show which aired on Telemundo from 2008 to 2021.

It originally premiered in 2008 as ¡Levántate! (Get Up!), which was produced from Telemundo's studios in Puerto Rico. In 2011, it re-located to Miami with a revamped on-air staff and a larger focus on entertainment content. In July 2012, the program was renamed Un Nuevo Día, after the addition of Adamari López as a new co-host.

In January 2021, Telemundo announced that Un Nuevo Día would be replaced by a new morning show, Hoy Día, beginning February 15, 2021.

== History ==
In May 2008, Telemundo announced that it would replace its existing morning show Cada Día (which had struggled in the ratings against Univision's dominant ¡Despierta América!) with a new program, ¡Levántate! The program would be produced from WKAQ in Puerto Rico, and be hosted by Alan Tacher, Erika Garza and Rashel Diaz. The show launched on November 26, 2008.

In 2010, it was announced that Levantate! would be re-located to Telemundo's studios in Miami in 2011, in order to provide greater synergies with Telemundo's other operations, and allow it to be produced in high definition. It broadcast its first edition from Miami on February 28, 2011. At the same time, the program underwent a retool, with a new format that would feature a "balance of information and entertainment ", and a new on-air team featuring Rashel Diaz, Daniel Sarcos, Omar Germenos, Azucena Cierco, and news correspondent Ramon Zayas.

=== As Un Nuevo Dia ===
On July 16, 2012, Telemundo rebranded Levantate! as Un Nuevo Dia; Puerto Rican actress Adamari López joined the program as an additional co-host.

In August 2013, Germenos announced that he would leave the program. Telemundo subsequently hired former Despierta América anchor Ana María Canseco. In 2014, another long-time Despierta América anchor, Neida Sandoval, joined Un Nuevo Dia. In 2016, Sandoval left the program after her contract with Telemundo was not renewed.

In 2015, Un Nuevo Día won the Daytime Emmy Award for Outstanding Morning Program in Spanish. The program would win the award again in 2017.

In May 2017, WNJU anchor Janice Bencosme joined the program as its new weather reporter. In June 2018, Guatemalan actor Héctor Sandarti joined the program as a new co-host.

In August 2020, María Celeste Arrarás and Rashel Díaz were laid off from Telemundo as part of a series of cuts by NBCUniversal, leaving Adamari López and Stephanie Himonidis as the remaining anchors.

== Notable staff ==
- Rashel Díaz (2008–2020)
- Daniel Sarcos (2011–2018)
- Alessandra Villegas (2011–2014)
- Adamari Lopez (2012–2021)
- Ana María Canseco (2013–2018)
- Diego Schoening (2013–2017)
- Francisco Cáceres (2013-2021)
- Neida Sandoval (2014–2016) News
- Marco Antonio Regil (2018–2019)
- Héctor Sandarti (2018–2020)
- Raúl González (2014-2017)
- Stephanie “Chiquibaby” Himonidis (2019–2021)
- Adriana Martin (2018– 2021)
- Paulina Sodi (2017–2021) News anchor

== Awards and nominations ==
Year	Award	Category	Recipient	Result	Ref.
2015	Daytime Emmy Award	Outstanding Morning Program in Spanish	Un Nuevo Día	Won	
2016	Daytime Emmy Award	Outstanding Morning Program in Spanish	Un Nuevo Día	Nominated	
2017	Daytime Emmy Award	Outstanding Morning Program in Spanish	Un Nuevo Día	Won	
2018	Daytime Emmy Award	Outstanding Morning Program in Spanish	Un Nuevo Día	Nominated	
2019	Daytime Emmy Award	Outstanding Morning Program in Spanish	Un Nuevo Día	Nominated	
2020	Daytime Emmy Award	Outstanding Morning Show in Spanish	Un Nuevo Día	Nominated	
2020	GLAAD Media Awards	Outstanding Spanish-Language TV Interview	"Cómo y Cuándo Salir del Clóset"	Won	
2020	GLAAD Media Awards	Outstanding Spanish-Language TV Interview	"Pareja Transgénero Quiere Tener Hijos"	Nominated	
2021	GLAAD Media Awards	Outstanding Spanish-Language TV Journalism	“Decisión de la Corte Suprema Para Comunidad LGBTQ”	Nominated	
2021	GLAAD Media Awards	Outstanding Spanish-Language TV Journalism	“Refugio para Pacientes de COVID-19 y Comunidad LGBTI en México”	Nominated	
