= Walter Mercado =

Puerto Rican astrologer (1932–2019)

- Born: Walter Mercado Salinas; March 9, 1931; Ponce, Puerto Rico
- Died: November 2, 2019 (aged 88); San Juan, Puerto Rico
- Burial place: Señorial Memorial Park, Cupey, San Juan, Puerto Rico
- Education: University of Puerto Rico
- Occupations: Astrologer; actor; dancer; writer; television personality
- Movement: Sanford Meisner
- Awards: Mr. Televisión (N.Y.C.); Señor Televisión (D.R.)

Walter Mercado Salinas (March 9, 1931 – November 2, 2019), also known by his stage name Shanti Ananda, was a Puerto Rican astrologer, actor, dancer, and writer, best known as a television personality for his shows as an astrologer. His astrological prediction shows began airing in Puerto Rico, eventually spreading to Latin America and the United States.

== Early years ==
Mercado was born on March 9, 1932, in Ponce, Puerto Rico, where he spent his early childhood. His parents were José María Mercado, from San Germán, Puerto Rico, and Aída Salinas from Catalonia, Spain. Mercado believed that he had spiritual abilities, even as a child. He attended university majoring in pedagogy, psychology and pharmacy, and used these skills to teach others, to study the human mind and to learn about the healing properties of medicinal plants.

== Professional career ==
=== Dancing and acting ===
Mercado Salinas studied singing and had a talent for dancing. He also studied classical and modern ballet. He was one of the most prolific dancers in Puerto Rico. He was the dancing partner of comedian Velda González.

Walter Mercado worked as an actor in the 1960s Puerto Rican telenovelas Un adiós en el recuerdo (A Farewell in the Memory) and Larga distancia (Long Distance), and also had a dramatic arts school called Walter Actors Studio 64.

=== Astrology ===
I always give the touch of love and they call me the Walter of Miracles

— Walter Mercado to WLRN

His TV debut as an entertainer came when Puerto Rican producer Elín Ortíz invited him to perform on his TV show when one guest artist did not show up. Walter Mercado happened to be at the station and Ortiz asked Mercado to use the 25-minute allotment scheduled for the other guest, to make astrological predictions wearing colorful and extravagant robes. After that, Mercado was made a regular in the show making astrological predictions. He would frequently appear in heavily decorated costumes and capes.

In 1970, Mercado started his regular astrology segment in El Show de las 12. He enhanced his studies with formal study into astrology, tarot, and other occult disciplines. Mercado hosted a weekly astrology television show at WKAQ-TV, Channel 2/Telemundo. In 1979, when the network changed its programming, Mercado moved his show to WRIK-TV (channel 7 in Ponce) where he hosted it for many years. In 1979, He continued producing his own show, paying Tommy Muñiz for the space in which it aired. The show hosted a number of celebrities during their visits to Puerto Rico. Westinghouse was a steady and long-time sponsor. In the 1980s, his show was seen on several TV channels throughout Latin America and the United States. When Tommy Muñiz bought WRIK-TV, Mercado stayed for two years then moved his show to WKBM-TV, Channel 11/Tele Once (later renamed WLII-TV/Univision). In addition to the TV programs, Mercado also wrote his predictions for newspapers, magazines, and web pages. He was a syndicated writer in the Miami Herald. He also appeared on various radio segments.

In 1986, Mercado was awarded the title Mr. Televisión by the Asociación de Cronistas del Espectáculo de Nueva York (Association of Latin Entertainment Critics of New York). By the end of the 1980s, Mercado had authored seven books, of which one, Más allá del horizonte (Beyond the Horizon), was published in Spanish, English and Portuguese.

From the mid-1990s until 2010, Mercado's show aired in the Univision network throughout the Americas, but on 8 January 2010, after a fifteen-year relationship, he announced that he and Univision had parted ways. He was managed by entrepreneur Bill Bakula. In 2005, he was invited to appear on Welsh singer/songwriter Lisa Scott-Lee’s show Totally Scott-Lee to give her a special reading. From 1994 to 2009, he also appeared on Primer Impacto, which airs on the Univision network in the United States.

Other ventures Mercado was involved with in the mid-2010s included a dating website; a line of Zodiac-themed soaps and hygiene items; and a popular personal website and app offering daily horoscopes and more. His eponymous website received over 1 million visits in the first month. On a limited basis, Mercado continued to make public appearances during this time period as well.

=== Name change and legal challenge ===
In October 2010, Mercado changed his name to "Shanti Ananda", a translation in Sanskrit of "peace happiness." He said a "being of light" imparted a spiritual revelation to him, which he referred to as his "authentic mystic name."

In January 2012, Mercado lost a lawsuit against Bart Enterprises International. He was trying to prevent it from using his name and likeness in future commercial ventures. Mercado signed a contract with the company in 1995. He severed ties with the company in 2006, which resulted in litigation being filed by both parties against each other. Chief Judge Sandra Lynch of the United States Court of Appeals for the First Circuit ruled that Bart Enterprises can continue using Mercado's name and likeness in future commercial projects. When asked about his legal case over the rights to his name, he replied, "I worked for many years, and gave some releases without thinking much about human wickedness."

== Personal life ==
In 2003, he announced that he maintained a "spiritual relationship" with the Brazilian actress and dancer Mariette Detotto, with whom he shared a TV program. In archival and recent interview clips on his life shown in a 2020 documentary, Mucho Mucho Amor: The Legend of Walter Mercado, Mercado defined himself as androgynous and insisted that the primary relationship of his life was with his fans; he also joked about being a virgin into his 80s. He always maintained his residence in Puerto Rico.

== Decline in health and death ==
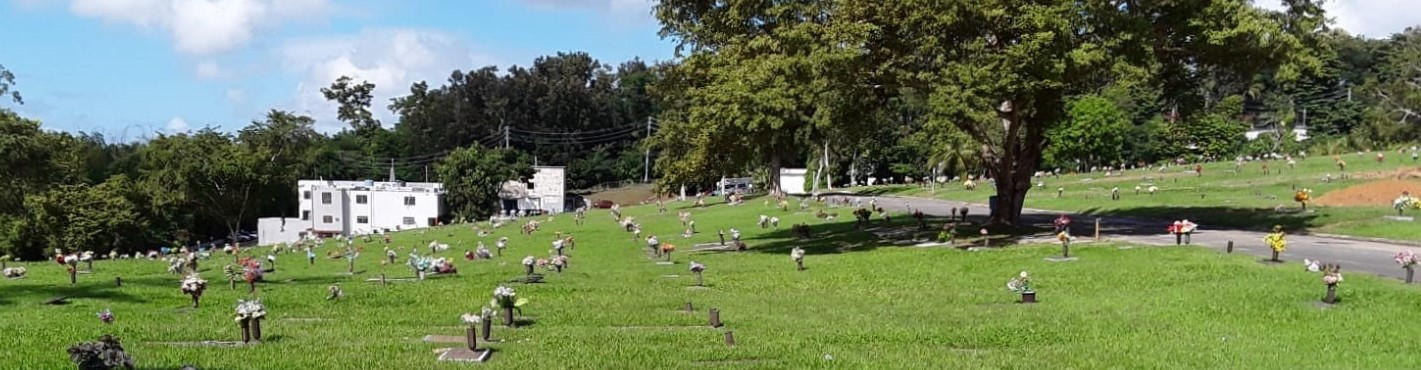
Señorial Memorial Park in Cupey is Mercado's burial place.

In January 2012, Mercado was flown to Cleveland Clinic, Cleveland, Ohio, with cardiac problems. He said he "had gone and seen death and came back to life again". Since the experience he said he had changed. He said he wanted to work with Puerto Rican youth, he planned to establish the Shanti Ananda foundation, create a mystic center, and donated three of his capes to a museum. Most of his capes had already been sold at auctions.

Mercado died on the night of Saturday, November 2, 2019, at the age of 88, reportedly from kidney failure, at Auxilio Mutuo Hospital in San Juan, Puerto Rico, according to hospital spokeswoman Sofia Luquis. He is buried at Señorial Memorial Park in Cupey barrio, San Juan, Puerto Rico.

== Accolades ==
- Awarded Mr. Televisión title by the Association of Latin Entertainment Critics of New York.
- Awarded Señor Televisión title at the 1972 Festival de Codazos in the Dominican Republic.

== Works ==
=== Television ===
- Historia de mi vida (1963)
- Ana Rosa (1965)
- La mujer de aquella noche (1968)
- Recordar (1968)
- Entre el puñal y la cruz (1969)
- Una sombra (1970)
- La intrusa (1970)
- Renzo el gitano (1971)
- Totally Scott-Lee (2005)
- Doritos advertisement (PepsiCo, 2016)

=== Theatre ===
- Anastasia
- Bodas de sangre
- La dama de las camelias
- Androcles y el león
- Los cuatro coroneles
- El tríptico de amor, dolor y muerte
- Todos los hijos de Dios tienen alas (1960)
- Mirando hacia atrás con ira (1970)

=== Discography ===
- Walter '84 (1984)
- Walter '86 (1986, Sonotone)
- Walter Mercado (1986)
- Guía para una vida mejor (1997)

=== Filmography ===
- Una mujer sin precio (1966) (choreographer)
- Hoy (2003)
- Chasing Papi (cameo, 2003)
- Mucho Mucho Amor: The Legend of Walter Mercado (posthumous Netflix documentary, 2020)

=== Books ===
- Mensajes Para Vivir, co-authored with Dr. Leon Alberto Vasquez (unknown date)
- Enciclopedia De Walter Mercado (Tomo 1) (1983)
- Más allá del horizonte (Beyond the Horizon: Visions of the New Millennium) (1997)
- Guia Para Una Vida Mejor (1997)
- El Mundo secreto de Walter Mercado (Spanish Edition) (2010)

== See also ==
- List of Puerto Ricans
- List of people from Ponce, Puerto Rico
