= Karla Martínez (TV presenter) =

Mexican TV show hostess (born 1976)

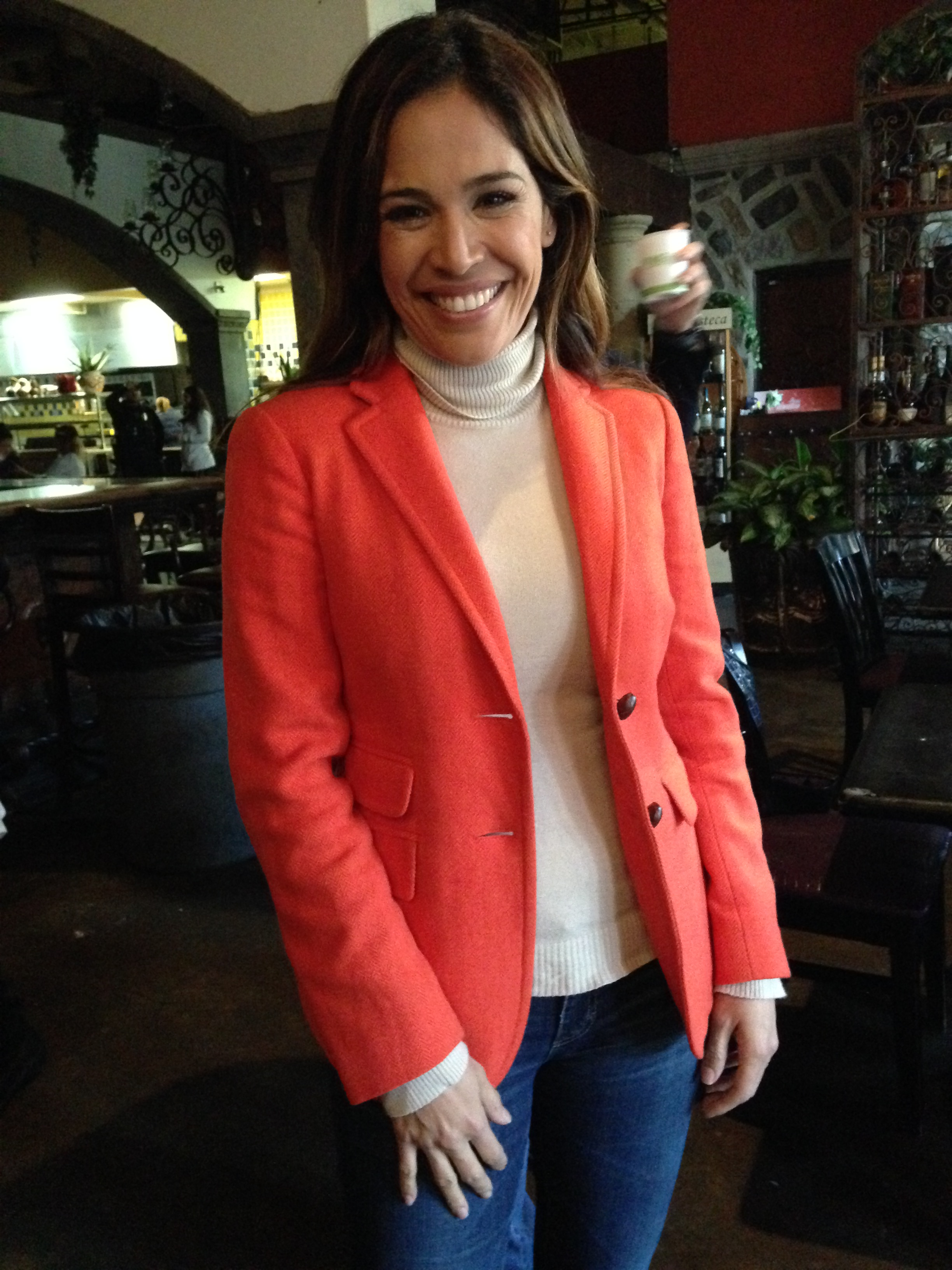
- Karla Martínez
- Born: May 11, 1976 (age 50); Ciudad Juárez, Mexico
- Occupation: TV Host

Karla Martínez (Spanish pronunciation: [ˈkaɾla maɾˈtines]; born May 11, 1976) is a Mexican TV show hostess. She is best known for hosting the show Control from 2000 to 2006 where she took over the show after Lesley Ann Machado's departure. She is currently a co-host on the popular morning show Despierta América on the Univision Network. And also, she is the voice of Isabella from Ferdinand.

Martínez graduated from the University of Texas at El Paso with a degree in electronic media. She began her career at KINT-TV, Univision's El Paso, Texas affiliate, in 1995.

In 2002, People en Español named Martínez one of its 25 Most Beautiful People.
