= Gustavo Cadile =

American/Argentinian fashion designer

- Born: May 5, 1969 (age 56); Junin, Buenos Aires, Argentina
- Education: International Fine Arts College in Miami
- Occupation: Fashion Designer
- Years active: 2006 to present
- Known for: his elegant and feminine gowns
- Awards: 2007 Perrier Emerging Designer, Chicago 2007 Gold Coast, 2010 International Fashion Group of Mexico, 2012 Florida Fashion Group

Gustavo Cadile is an American/Argentinian fashion designer.

== Early life and career ==
Born and raised in Junín, Buenos Aires Province, Argentina, Gustavo Cadile is of Italian descent. His great-grandfather, Enrico Dell' Acqua was an influential Italian textile industrialist both in Italy and in Argentina. Captivated by his grandfather's knowledge and eye for fabrics and his mother's eccentric European sensibility, Gustavo dreamed of becoming a designer.

Gustavo attended the International Fine Arts College in Miami where he graduated with a Fashion Design Degree. He worked for Neiman Marcus organizing shows and sales. To pursue his dream of becoming a designer, Gustavo traveled to Italy where he lived for three and a half years working for famous designers in Milan and Rome. However, as a young designer, the excitement of New York beckoned to him. He worked for Perry Ellis, the epiphany of classic American Sportswear, as well as with Oleg Cassini's bridal collection.

In 2007 Gustavo Cadile launched his namesake label and has been growing ever since. In 2015, he introduced his bridal label with much success. He interweaves Italian artistry with Argentinian imagery to create uniquely beautiful gowns and cocktails dresses. His creations are made with the finest fabrics and manufactured in New York City.

His gowns have been worn by many celebrities such as Catherine Zeta-Jones, Kelly Preston, Geena Davis, Anjelica Huston, Kate Walsh, Gloria Estefan, Emily Ratajkowski, Reese Witherspoon, Demi Lovato, Kim Kardashian, Emily Deschanel, Giuliana Rancic, Elizabeth Hurley, Ashley Judd, Sofia Vergara, Julianne Hough, Laura Prepon, Jamie Pressly, Emmanuel Chriqui and Eva Longoria, among others. His collections can be found at Saks Fifth Avenue and many boutiques and specialty stores in America.

Gustavo Cadile has been recognized for his craftsmanship and quality, as well as for designing elegant feminine dresses receiving, therefore, the New Emerging Designer Award in 2007 at the Gold Coast Awards in Chicago . He was nominated in 2008 and 2009 for the Fashion Group International's Rising Star Award and in 2013, he was awarded the Fashion Group International Award in Miami.
