= Alan Tacher =

Mexican television host (born 1971)

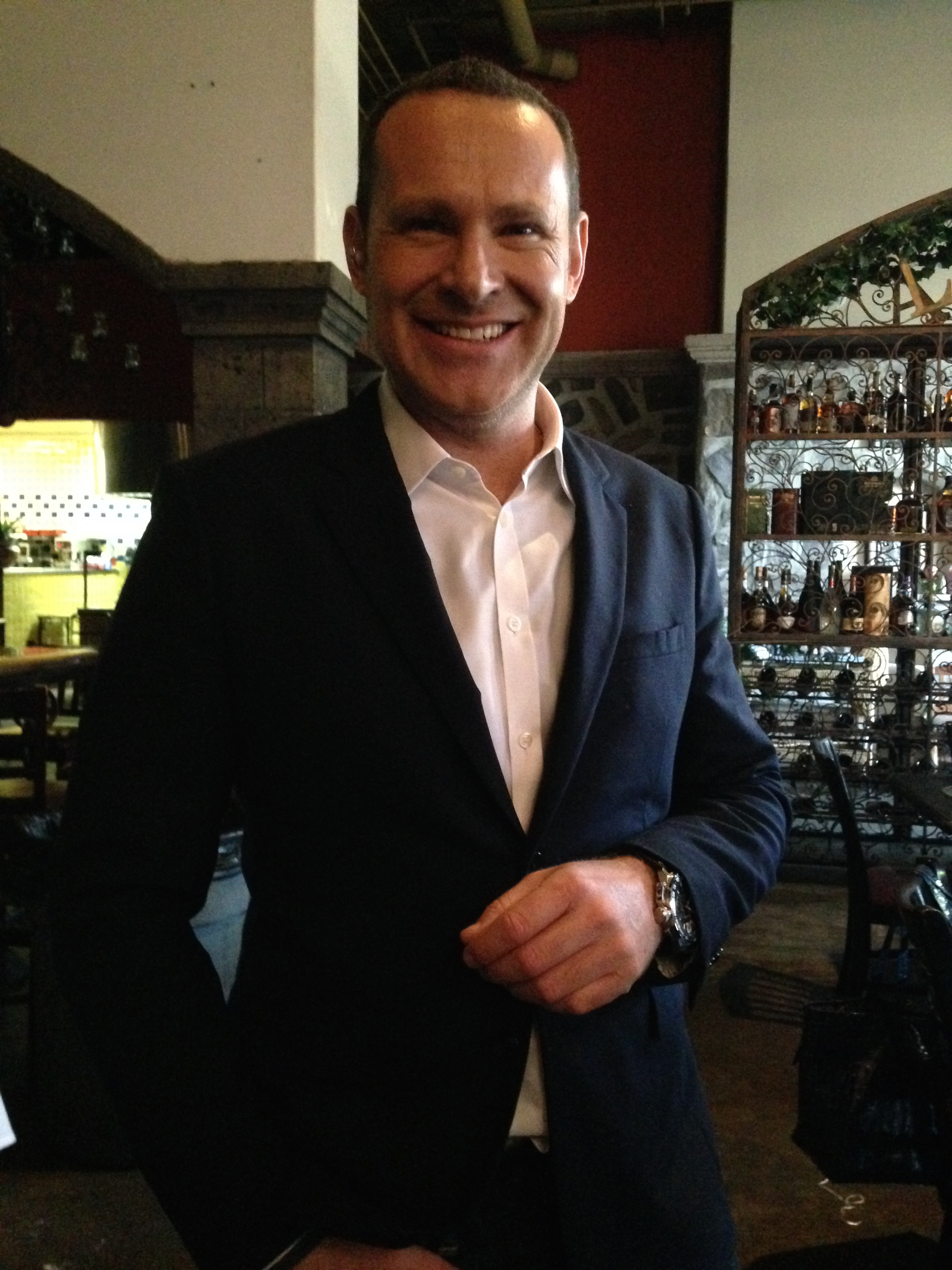
- Born: Alan Tacher Feingold; 28 March 1971 (age 53)
- Occupation: Television host
- Relatives: Mark Tacher (brother), Erick Tacher (brother)

Alan Tacher Feingold (born 28 March 1971) is a Mexican-American television host who is part of the main cast of Univision's morning show Despierta América. He is the older brother of actor and television host Mark Tacher.

== Television ==
- Califa de Oro (1995)
- Te caché (1996-1997)
- Chitón (1997-1998)
- Tempranito (1998)
- Gente con Chispa (2000-2003)
- La Academia (2002-2005)
- Aplauso Aplauso (2004)
- Levántate (2008)
- Décadas (2010)
- Hoy (2011-2012)
- ¡Despierta América! (2012–present)
- Nuestra Belleza Latina 2015 (Celebrity guest; Finale)
