= Primer Impacto =

US Spanish-language television program

- Also known as: Primer Impacto: Fin de Semana (weekend editions, 1994–2011); Primer Impacto Extra (daily late-evening editions, 1998–2019)
- Genre: Newsmagazine
- Presented by: Pamela Silva (2011–present); Michelle Galván (2017-present); Jackie Guerrido (weather forecaster)
- Country of origin: United States
- Original language: Spanish
- No. of seasons: 29

Production
- Production locations: Univision NewsPort, Doral, Florida
- Camera setup: Multi-camera
- Running time: 60 minutes
- Production companies: Univision Network, Inc.

Original release
- Network: Univision
- Release: February 14, 1994 – present

Related
- Noticias y Más

Primer Impacto (Spanish for 'First Impact'; Spanish pronunciation: [pɾimeɾ impakto]) is an American Spanish-language tabloid newsmagazine television program that premiered on Univision on February 14, 1994.

The show is well known in Latin America for its tabloid format, and a focus on crime and sensationalistic reporting (including heavy use of caught-on-tape footage and airing of graphic imagery with little to no editing to fit broadcast standards), as well as entertainment news and human-interest stories; however, it also provides a general rundown of the day's headlines, as well as national weather and sports segments. Another particular element of the show has been the show's set, which, even with rebuilds throughout its history, has always had an anchor desk deliberately designed to display the legs of its female anchors, who purportedly wear revealing business casual clothing during the program. Being one of the first and foremost tabloid news shows in Latin America, it receives some of the highest ratings for an American Hispanic TV program worldwide, though it has also been criticized by many viewers and media insiders for its content; such scrutiny has led to the derogatory monikers "Noticiero de las Piernas" ("News with Legs") and "Las Noticias Cochinas" ("The Dirty News") to describe the show.

The program is broadcast live Monday through Friday at 5:00 p.m. Eastern and Pacific Time; weekend editions of the program (under the title Primer Impacto: Fin de Semana; "First Impact: Weekend Edition") were produced from March 2, 1994 until September 2011, when budget cuts at Univision forced the cancellation of its Saturday and Sunday editions (following an aborted attempt to restructure it as a weekday-only broadcast amid budget reductions imposed in 2009). A condensed half-hour late edition of the program, Primer Impacto Extra, aired from January 1998 to September 20, 2019, as a lead-in for the network's 11:30 p.m. ET/PT newscast, Noticiero Univision: Edicion Nocturna; on September 23, 2019, Extra was replaced in the 11:00 p.m. slot by a rebroadcast of the early-evening edition of Noticiero Univision and Sabor de Mañana ("Taste of Tomorrow"), a five-minute filler segment—slotted between both broadcasts of the network's flagship news program—that previews Univision's news and entertainment/lifestyle shows for the next day. (Primer Impacto Extra was preempted by local late-evening newscasts on most of the network's broadcast stations, airing mainly on its national feed and on Univision stations without a local news department.)

The show's main anchors are Michelle Galván and Pamela Silva; Verónica Del Castillo is the show's main Mexico City-based anchor, contributing to reports on Mexican-centered stories, and occasionally serving as a fill-in anchor. Jackie Guerrido is the show's main weather forecaster, and also acts as the main fill-in presenter; both WLTV chief meteorologist Eduardo Rodríguez and Univision meteorologist Paola Elorza substitute for Guerrido in the event the latter is assigned to substitute as co-anchor or is absent. Félix Fernández and Fernando Fiore present the sports segment, produced by the TUDN sports division.

== Broadcast history ==
The original Primer Impacto logo used from 1994 to 1996.

The program was preceded by Noticias y Más ("News and More") in 1991 with Raul Peimbert and Jackie Nespral anchoring. Nespral left the show later that year and was replaced by Myrka Dellanos. On February 14, 1994, the show was replaced by a new program called Primer Impacto. By this time, Peimbert left Univision, and was replaced by María Celeste Arrarás joining Dellanos as co-host. Arrarás had already substituted for Dellanos on Noticias y Más during a brief period while anchoring Noticiero Univision: Fin de Semana, and she was eventually rehired to co-host the show after being called by the producers.

Primer Impacto rapidly became a success, with both Dellanos and Arrarás becoming a subject for discussion, and the show's content becoming more commented than the content of the more serious Noticiero Univision. Gossip magazines also began commenting on the show's popularity, even including Dellanos and Arrarás in their front pages and even featuring paparazzi reports about the personal lives of both anchors. Even many TV channels in Latin America noticed the success of the show, even creating similar tabloid-focused shows to mixed results.

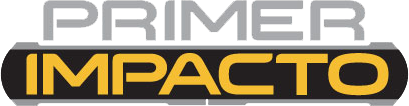
Primer Impacto logo, used from 2013 to 2017.

In 2002, Arrarás left the show in order to give birth to her first child, she also accepted an offer from rival Telemundo to host a competing show, Al Rojo Vivo. She would be replaced as main co-host by Barbara Bermudo. The show also added then-husband-and-wife Fernando del Rincón and Carmen Dominicci as co-anchors of a new late edition, Primer Impacto Extra. In 2004, after 10 years on the show, Myrka Dellanos left the program. In 2005, Carmen Dominicci left the show to anchor the unsuccessful evening newscast of sister network Telefutura, En Vivo y Directo; she would eventually return less than a year later as a fill-in anchor. In 2006, Satcha Pretto joined the program, and would sometimes fill in for Bermudo or Del Rincon whenever they had the day off.

In 2007, Colombian-born Ilia Calderón joined the program as a fill-in anchor. Calderón would be elevated as main co-anchor after Fernando del Rincón and Carmen Dominicci were fired from the program and the network in 2008 as a result of allegations made by Dominicci of domestic abuse from Del Rincón. On June 3, 2011 it was announced that Pamela Silva Conde would be joining Primer Impacto, after Ilia Calderón was elevated to be co-anchor of Noticiero Univision Edición Nocturna, which follows Primer Impacto Extra.

In 2010, Primer Impacto Extra weekend anchor Satcha Pretto left the program to become news anchor for Univision's morning show ¡Despierta América!; Pretto was replaced on the weekend editions by Natalia Cruz. In 2017, Michelle Galvan replaced Barbara Bermudo, after she left Univision after 14 years as anchor.

Walter Mercado provided the flamboyant astrology predictions for the show. He announced on January 8, 2010 that he and Univision have parted ways after fifteen years. However, Victor Florencio, also known as El Niño Prodigio, later joined the program in 2021 to also provide the astrology predictions, but left the program in 2023. Maria Elena Salinas and Edna Schmidt have both had guests co-hosting duties on the show.

== Segments ==
There are various segments in Primer Impacto, the most important are: news of the U.S. and the world, República Deportiva (Sports Republic, now a spin-off weekly program), movies, weather, horoscope (dropped in 2010; returned in 2021 then dropped once more in 2023), curiosities and the main story of the day.

=== Current anchors ===
- Pamela Silva – Co-Anchor, (2011–present)
- Jackie Guerrido – Co-Anchor Weather Forecaster (2004–present)
- Michelle Galván – Co-Anchor (2017–present) Joined Primer Impacto after Barbara’s departure.
- Borja Voces - Co-Anchor (2014–present), host of "Secreto a Voces".
- Paola Elorza – Co-Anchor Weather Weekends, (February 2000–present) was in a Cientific Investigative Journalism Boot Camp at M.I.T.
- Verónica Del Castillo – also replaces anchors and have reporting duties from Mexico City.

=== Reporters ===
- Salvador Duran - Los Angeles and Phoenix reporter

=== Former on–air staff ===
† Indicates deceased

- María Celeste Arrarás - Co-Anchor (1992-2002) Host and managing editor of Al Rojo Vivo con María Celeste
- Carmen Dominicci - Co-Anchor (2002-June 3, 2011) In 2011, she joined as a co-host and correspondent for the "Al Rojo Vivo" news program and joined the special investigative team of Noticias Telemundo.
- Satcha Pretto - Weekend Anchor (July 13, 2006 – 2011) left the program to become the new News Anchor for Univisions Despierta America.
- Myrka Dellanos - Co-Anchor (1992-2004) In 2013, she joined as host and contributor for American-based Hispanic network Estrella TV.
- Ilia Calderón - (March 2007-June 3, 2011) stay on "Noticiero Univision."
- Barbara Bermudo - Co-Anchor (2002-January 5, 2017)
- Natalia Cruz - Co-Anchor Weekends, (2011-2018)
- Walter Mercado † - Astrologer (1994-2009)
- Victor "Niño Prodigio" Florencio - Astrologer (2021–2023)
