= Fernando Arau =

Mexican actor

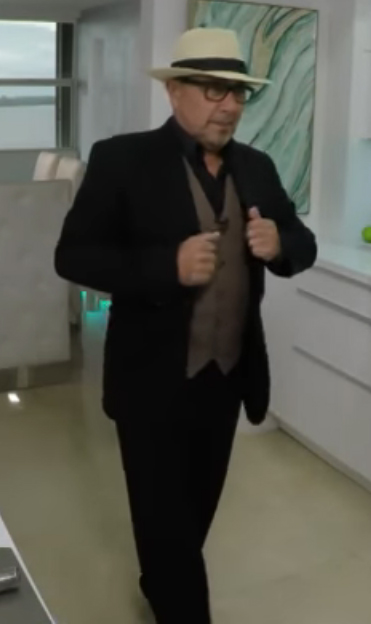
- Arau in 2017
- Born: November 2, 1953 (age 72); Mexico City, Mexico
- Citizenship: United States
- Years active: 1981–present

Fernando Arau (born November 3, 1953) is a Mexican comedian, actor, producer and director. He is best known for his TV roles, as Chicho in Televisa's hugely successful comedy "Cachun Cachun Ra Ra" (1981–1987) and Univision's daily morning show "Despierta America" (1997–2009).

== Achievements ==
In 2006 he received an Honorary Emmy for his leadership in Spanish language Television. He has also received 2 Ariel Award nominations as Best Supporting Actor for his role in "Bienvenido-Welcome" (1995) and for Best Actor in "Chido Guan, El Tacos de Oro" (1985).

== Early life ==
Fernando Arau was born and raised in Mexico City in a family with deep roots in entertainment. His father, Alfonso Arau is an actor, writer and director best known for his film "Like Water for Chocolate". His mother Magdalena Corona, was a principal dancer and choreographer for the Ballet Folklorico de México dance company. Her brother, comedian Sergio Corona, is known as 'El Cómico de Mexico'.

His older brother Sergio Arau is a musician, writer, director, producer, and graphic artist who's best known for his film "A Day Without a Mexican". His younger sister Rossana Arau is a TV and film producer.

== Career ==
Fernando's career started at the early age of 6, tap-dancing with the children's musical group "Los Sony Boys". By age 7, and together with his older brother Sergio, they joined the legendary TV show "La Media Hora de Chabelo" as the singing duo "Los Hermanitos Arau. He had his first gigs as a musician, playing base and drums with his brother Alfonso and by 1970 they formed the rock band "La Ley de Herodes". In 1971 they performed at the Avandaro Festival.

That same year and under his father and his close friend Alejandro Jodorowsky's tutelage, Fernando learns "the art of silence" mime techniques. In 1979 he is selected to represent Mexico at the First International Mime Gathering during the Festival Cervantino in Guanajuato, Mexico, becoming the first Mexican Mime to receive an international recognition by winning first prize beating the French, Italian and Canadian teams.

In 1981 he is invited by Televisa producer Luis de Llano to participate and co-develop a new teen comedy series, "Cachún Cachún Ra Ra!". Fernando initially joined as a writer but eventually in 1982 became part of the cast as well as a producer and alternate director of the series. "Cachún Cachún Ra Ra! became a hugely popular show which aired in Mexico until 1987.

During his 22 years in Televisa, Arau worked as an actor, writer, producer, director, and musician at a series of shows that included "La Rueda de la Fortuna" (Wheel of Furtune), "Ombligo Club", Corazon Son Son, and "Los Papas de Mis Papas".

In 1985 together with his brother Sergio they opened Rockotitlán, the first club that would only book Rock en Español bands in Mexico City. Rockotitlán became the centerpiece and meeting place for the nascent genre and featured historical performances of some of the most iconic Mexican rock bands such as Caifanes, Café Tacuba, Ritmo Peligroso, El Tri, Aleks Syntek, Fobia, La Maldita Vecindad, Tex Tex, Santa Sabina, Bon y los Enemigos del Silencio, Neon, as well as Sergio's culturally nationalistic rock group, promoter of the "guacarock" sound, Botellita de Jerez.

He received an Ariel Award nomination in 1987 as Best Actor for his role in his father's film "Chido Guan el Tacos de Oro". Fernando's oldest son Ademar Arau, won the award as Best Child Actor.

In 1993 Fernando is again nominated for another Ariel Award as Best Supporting Actor for his role in the Gabriel Retes' film "Bienvenido-Welcome".

From 1987 until 1996 Fernando enjoyed critical and popular success as a stand-up comedian by creating shows using a singular approach that combined mime, music, magic, and humor.

In 1996 Fernando Arau created and produced the first amateur contest for aspiring comedians, Riatatan. Nearly 100 participants from all over Mexico competed. The final was held at the Arena Mexico in front of 17 thousand spectators. First place was won by Liliana Arriaga "La Chupitos", followed by Edson Zúñiga "El Norteño" with second, and Luis Manuel Avila, received third.

In 1997 Fernando Arau was hired by Univision to host their daily morning show "Despierta América". The show enjoyed huge success and Fernando became a household name at its helm for 12 years.

In 2006 the Academy of Television Arts & Sciences recognized him with the Honorary Emmy for his leadership role in Spanish language Television.

Through his TV production company Arauvision, Fernando built The Green Screen Studios to offer virtual reality services in Miami as well as to produce his daily morning show "Tenga Pa'Que Se Entretenga". The show, which began streaming in 2010, was a precursor by integrating audience participation through social media.

In 2012 he hosted "Soy tu Doble" and wrote, directed and hosted "Buenas Noches America" on TV Azteca and Azteca America, respectively.

This same year he won second place in Univision's "Mira Quien Baila" reality show.

In 2014 he won second place in Telemundo's first season of Top Chef Estrellas.

Fernando Arau currently hosts "America's Funniest Videos Latinoamerica" in Telemundo and has a daily morning show that airs locally in Miami radio on 88.3 FM and streams live with La Nueva FM.

Fernando Arau remains on permanent tour, writing producing, directing, and starring in his own stand-up comedy shows and monologues touring in the US and Mexico.

== Television ==
Year	Show	Role	Network
1981–1987	Cachún Cachún Ra Ra!	Chicho	Televisa
1990	Alcanzar una Estrella	Bernardo 'Barrabaz'	Televisa
1991	Alcanzar una Estrella II	Bernardo 'Barrabaz'	Televisa
1992	Los Papás de Mis Papás		Televisa
1997–2009	Despierta América	Host	Univision
2012	Soy tu Doble	Host	TV Azteca
2012	Buenas Noches América	Host	Azteca América
2014	Top Chef Estrellas	Celebrity Contestant	Telemundo
2014	Mira Quien Baila	Celebrity Contestant	Univision
2015	El Desafío de Buddy – 2nd Season	Co-Host	Discovery
2015–present	America's Funniest Videos Latin America	Host	Telemundo

== Filmography ==
Year	Film	Role
1984	¡¡Cachún Cachún Ra Ra!! (Una Loca Loca Preparatoria)	Severino Urrutia
1985	Chido Guan, El Tacos de Oro	Gabriel Rodriguez
1987	El Misterio de la Casa Abandonada	Sacerdote
1992	Cándido de día, Pérez de Noche	El Suicida
1992	Hay Para Todas	
1995	Bienvenido-Welcome	Jose Consuelo Gómez/Messenger
2004	A Day Without a Mexican	Undocumented 1
2009	Grampa	Grampa Friend
