= Satcha Pretto =

Honduran-American journalist (born 1980)

- Born: Satcha Pretto Padilla Cisneros; April 5, 1980 (age 46); La Paz, Honduras
- Occupations: Journalist, TV anchor, charity fundraiser

Satcha Pretto (born April 5, 1980) is a Honduran-American journalist and news co-anchor of the Univision Network's popular morning show Despierta America.

== Early life ==
Pretto was born in La Paz, Honduras, the daughter of Honduran Liz Padilla and Panamanian Rolando Pretto. She lived in Tegucigalpa, Honduras from the age of three until she was 18 years old. Her father died from a heart attack in 1996.

Pretto studied in bilingual schools in Honduras: Mayan Elementary School and Macris High School in Tegucigalpa. Her excellent academic record earned her a scholarship in 1998 to attend Angelo State University in San Angelo, Texas. In 2001, she graduated with a B.A. in Communications.

She speaks English and Spanish fluently.

== Career ==
While still in high school in Honduras, at the age of 17, Satcha had the opportunity via the National Broadcasters Association of Honduras to get a job at a radio station. She was hired by Radio Suprema Stereo 99.5 in Tegucigalpa where, prior to hitting the airwaves, she received intense training during three months. Her radio debut as the host of a three-hour-long live show came in August 1997. Pretto broadcast the show (in her school uniform) for one year.

She started her professional career as a television journalist in Midland-Odessa, Texas, as a reporter and anchor of the late night newscast of KTLE-Telemundo. She was also able to work as a reporter for KWES-TV channel 9, an NBC affiliate and Telemundo KTLE's sister station. Pretto worked in West Texas from January 2002 to September 2003.

In October 2003, Pretto moved to Dallas, Texas, where she was hired to co-anchor KUVN channel 23's (an Univision affiliate) 5:00 p.m. newscast, Cinco en Punto (Five o'Clock) and report for the late night newscast, Edición Nocturna (Nightly Edition). While at KUVN, Pretto worked with the CNN Cable Network as a reporter for Anderson Cooper 360 and the now-defunct Paula Zahn Now. Pretto's most memorable interview in Dallas was with famous Chilean writer Isabel Allende in March 2006.

On July 13, 2006, Univision Communications Inc. announced the naming of Satcha Pretto as the new co-host of the highly rated daily newsmagazine Primer Impacto - Fin de Semana (First Impact - Weekend Edition), on Saturday and Sunday, 5:00-6:00 p.m. ET/PT (4:00-5:00 p.m. CT). Just six months after joining the Univision Network, Pretto hosted the network's broadcast of the 2007 Tournament of Roses Parade, and did so again in January 2008. In May 2007, Pretto covered a visit by Pope Benedict XVI to Brazil and was subsequently chosen to be part of a select group of 70 journalists who traveled with the pope during his visit to the United States in 2008. In doing so, Pretto made history by becoming the first female journalist from a Spanish-language media outlet in the U.S. to travel on board the Pope's plane.

On July 18, 2011, Pretto joined Univision's ¡Despierta América!

== Recognitions ==
Between April 19–21, 2001 Pretto, as a senior majoring in communications at Angelo State University, received a recognition from the Texas Intercollegiate Press Association meeting in Wichita Falls, in the live competitions. She won first place in TV announcing. In June 2001, she was selected by the National Association of Hispanic Journalists as one of only 12 students from the U.S. and Puerto Rico to be part of El Noticiero. Pretto anchored the student produced show in English and did one story in Spanish. That same organization chose her in 2005 to serve as mentor during its annual convention.

She has also received several recognitions for her professional work in broadcast journalism, including an Emmy as part of the KMEX channel 34 team that garnished the prestigious award in the "Live Special Events Programming" category for the 2007 Tournament of Roses Parade broadcast. Pretto also received an Emmy nomination for best investigative report and an award from Texas Associated Press Broadcasters. In May 2008, one of her investigative reports was among the finalists for the Livingston Awards for journalists under 35. In addition, Vanidades magazine recognized her with its "Tribute to Hispanic Women" award in the journalism category in 2006. The magazine "People en Espanol" chose Pretto as one of the 10 best dressed celebrities in 2009 and included her on the exclusive list of its "50 most beautiful" in 2010. In 2017, it named her one of the "25 Most Powerful Women".

Pretto is active in several charity projects. She was named "Smile Ambassador" for the nonprofit organization Operation Smile, a group dedicated to repair childhood facial deformities while building public and private partnerships that advocate for sustainable healthcare systems for children and families. She is also a runner and a triathlete and participates in races that help raise funds for charity.

== Personal life ==
Pretto married American businessman Aaron Butler in Barcelona in 2013, the city where he had proposed a year earlier. They have two children.
