= ¡Despierta América! =

American Spanish-language morning television show

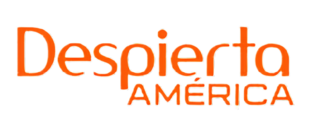
- Created by: Jose Rafael Perez
- Directed by: Francy González; Michel Martinez
- Presented by: Alan Tacher; Karla Martínez; Satcha Pretto; Francisca Lachapel; Jessica Rodríguez; Raúl González; Ana María Canseco; Jomari Goyso
- Country of origin: United States
- Original language: Spanish
- No. of seasons: 20

Production
- Executive producer: Luz María Doria
- Producer: Víctor José Santiago
- Production locations: Miami, Florida
- Camera setup: Multi-camera
- Running time: 240 minutes (including commercials)
- Production company: N+ Univision

Original release
- Network: Univision
- Release: April 14, 1997 – present

¡Despierta América! (pronounced [desˈpjeɾta aˈmeɾika] – lit. 'Wake Up, America!') is an American Spanish-language morning television show airing on Univision. Debuting on April 14, 1997, the program's primarily targets the Latino population in the United States. It is broadcast from the network's studios in Miami, Florida, and is hosted by Raúl González, Jessica Rodríguez, Jomari Goyso, Karla Martínez, Alan Tacher, Francisca Lachapel, Ana María Canseco, and Satcha Pretto.

Other reporters or celebrities also provide entertainment and gossip segments, and will occasionally appear as guest hosts if one of the regular hosts is unavailable (for instance, actress Galilea Montijo has appeared frequently during the show's run). The show also features contributors that cover a variety of topics such as immigration, technology, diet, exercise and personal motivation. Among the permanent and occasional contributors of the show are Dr. Mario Lovo (immigration), Ariel Coro (technology expert), Claudia Molina (exercise), Adriana Martin (fitness and lifestyle), Alejandro Chabán (weight loss), Ismael Cala, María Marín, Alberto Sardiñas (motivation), Laura Posada (lifestyle) among many others.

The program airs weekdays from 7:00 to 11:00 a.m. Eastern Time and Pacific Time/10:00 am Central Time, with :25 mark every hour for local news and weather headlines update; as Univision holds complete responsibility for its affiliates' programming, the network does not tape delay ¡Despierta América! individually by U.S. time zone (only running a delayed broadcast for the network's Pacific Time feed). Although similar in format to English language competitors Good Morning America, CBS Mornings, and Today, ¡Despierta América! maintains more of a focus on interviews, and entertainment and feature stories; news headlines are generally limited to a segment that airs each half-hour, and national weather segments only appear once an hour during the first three hours of the broadcast (compared to the half-hourly weather updates that appear on other national morning news programs).

== History ==
On April 14, 1997, Univision launched Despierta América as a Spanish language competitor to NBC's Today, ABC's Good Morning America and CBS This Morning. Despierta América is known for coining the catch phrase, "échate pa' acá" ("Come here"), which is a segment regarding news and gossip about Latin entertainers. This was later carried over to another show Un Nuevo Día on Telemundo in 2013. Despierta América has since developed its own brand and style of reporting news of various genres, such as immigration, sports, consumer, health, lifestyle, fashion, beauty and entertainment content. With a staff of approximately 30 (made up of writers, editors, producers, and support staff based out of Miami) and additional bureaus across the country and in Mexico, Despierta América airs each weekday every morning with four full hours of news and entertainment.

The original Despierta América logo, used from 1997 to 2010.

While Jackie Guerrido initially provided national weather updates during each broadcast, after she left the show full-time often one or another of the hosts would do the segments (most notably Raúl, who would do various reggaeton-styled musical updates for some time). Ximena Cordoba has become an asset to the show in taking over the role of weather reporter and health & beauty contributor.

On February 17, 2017, the show celebrated its 20th anniversary with a special five hour edition, with former hosts coming back for a reunion.

On September 13, 2021, Noticias Univision (now N+ Univision) and Univision announced the co-hosts for a new Sunday edition of the morning show, starting at 8:00 AM Eastern and Pacific Time/7:00 AM Central, with :25 mark for local news and weather headlines. They would be Raúl González, Maria Antonieta Collins, Jackie Guerrido and Carolina Rosario. On January 11, 2023, Univision canceled the Sunday edition.

== Notable on-air staff ==
=== Current ===
Name	Run	Role
Karla Martínez	2006–present	Host
Satcha Pretto	2011–present	News anchor
Alan Tacher	2012–present	Host
Francisca Lachapel	2015–present	Host
Raúl González	2001–2014; 2018–Present	Host
Ana María Canseco	1997–2010; 2020–present	Host
Jomari Goyso	2022–present	Host
Jessica Rodriguez	2022–present	Host
Lindsay Casinelli	2022–present	Host and TUDN (Brand) Sports Anchor
Jessica Delgado	2022–present	On-Air Meteorologist
Chef Yisus	2017–present	TV Chef and Host

=== Former ===
- Giselle Blondet (1997–2005)
- Rafael José (1997–2010)
- Fernando Arau (1997–2009)
- Jackie Guerrido (2003–2008)
- Félix de Bedout (2011–2012)
- Poncho de Anda (2010–2012)
- Chiquinquirá Delgado (2011–2012)
- Ximena Córdoba (2013–2015)
- Alejandro Chaban (2015–2016)
- Johnny Lozada (2012–2016)
- William Valdes (2014–2017)
- Ana Patricia Gámez (2011-2019)
- Maity Interiano (2016-2022)
- Alberto Martinez (2019–2022)
- Carlos Calderon (2017-2023)

== Segments ==
=== Current ===
- Sin Rollo: Segment hosted by Carlos Calderon, Jomari Goyso, Marcela Sarmiento, and Paola Gutierrez. The hosts discuss controversial current issues.
- Revoltillo Digital: Segment hosted by Jessica Rodriguez. She hosts news from the entertainers on social media.
- Chef Doreen Colondres hosts cookery segments.

== Other ==
- COVID-19 pandemic coverage of issues affecting Hispanic Americans in and around New York City was covered by Jorge Viera in 2020 for ¡Despierta America!.

== Pets ==
"Cosita" was a female dog that had a daily participation on Despierta America for 10 years. After her owner decided to retire her in order for her to become a mother, she was celebrated during her last show with a goodbye party. "Cosita" died in 2010, her death being announced on the show by news reporter Neida Sandoval.

== See also ==
- List of television shows set in Miami
