= Mass media in Colombia =

Mass media in Colombia refers to Mass media available in Colombia consisting of several different types of communications media: television, radio, cinema, newspapers, magazines, and Internet-based Web sites. Colombia also has a national music industry.

Many of the media are controlled by large for-profit corporations who reap revenue from advertising, subscriptions, and sale of copyrighted material, largely affected by piracy.

Media in Colombia is regulated by the Ministry of Communications and the National Television Commission.

Many deregulation and convergence have occurred in an attempt by the government to turn the mass media industry in Colombia more competitive, leading to mega-mergers, further concentration of media ownership, and the emergence of multinational media conglomerates. Critics allege that localism, local news and other content at the community level, media spending and coverage of news, and diversity of ownership and views have suffered as a result of these processes of media concentration.

In 2015, Colombia ranked 128th place on the Reporters Without Borders press freedom scale, making it one of the most dangerous places to be a mass media journalist.

== Newspapers ==
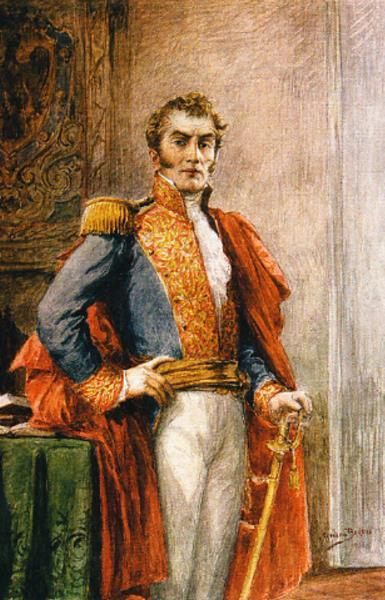
The first newspaper published in Colombia was La Bagatela, edited by Antonio Nariño in 1811.

Newspaper media in Colombia date back to the Spanish colonization of the Americas. The first newspaper published in Colombia was La Bagatela, edited by Antonio Nariño in 1811. In Colombia the most read and influential newspaper is El Tiempo, which also has the highest newspaper circulation in the country. It was founded in 1911 by Alfonso Villegas Restrepo and currently owned by Luis Carlos Sarmiento Angulo.

Another influential newspaper is El Espectador, founded in 1887 by Fidel Cano Gutiérrez, was for many years one of the most important dailies in Colombia but due to a financial crisis its circulation was restricted to one edition weekly between 2001 and 2008, when it returned as a daily. El Nuevo Siglo, a conservative newspaper, focuses on political news. El Espacio, founded in 1965 by Ciro Gómez Mejía, was the main yellow journalism newspaper in the country until 2013 when it was sold to Roberto Esper Espaje after it could not cope with the competence of fledgling tabloids Q'Hubo and Extra. El Tiempo and El Espectador are the only newspapers of national distribution.

Free newspapers include Publimetro (Bogotá, Medellín, Cali, and Barranquilla) and ADN, published by El Tiempo in the same cities mentioned plus Bucaramanga.

El País newspaper is the main source of written information in the south-western region of the country, specially in the Valle del Cauca department. El Colombiano newspaper, based in Medellín, is the most influential newspaper in the Paisa Region. Other regional newspapers include La Crónica del Quindío, La Opinión, and El Heraldo, which covers the area of the Caribbean Region of Colombia. MIRA is a tabloid format newspaper with circulation of some 150,000 per week. It is edited by MIRA political party.

El Bogotano is a virtual news platform with a tradition en newsprint since 1973. It is an open ended virtual newspaper that allows for independent journalists to publish in its multiple content platforms.

The main current issues magazines published in Colombia are Semana and Cromos; Cambio folded in 2010.

== Specialized written media ==
=== Business, finance and economics ===
- Portafolio
- Dinero Magazine
- La Republica

== Radio ==
The country has three major national radio networks: Radiodifusora Nacional de Colombia, a state-run national radio; Caracol Radio and RCN Radio, privately owned networks with hundreds of affiliates. There are other national networks, including Cadena Super, Todelar, and Colmundo, among others. Many hundreds of radio stations are registered with the Ministry of Communications.

- Caracol Radio, founded in Medellín in 1948. It was owned by Julio Mario Santo Domingo until 2004, when the network was rescinded of Caracol TV and sold to PRISA.
  - Los 40 Principales Colombia.
  - HJCK. Cultural station. Founded in 1950. Since 2005 it is broadcast by Internet only.
  - Radioacktiva - Planeta Rock. Founded in 1989. Rock music programming.
- RCN Radio. Founded in 1948 by Enrique and Roberto Ramírez. Its main secondary networks are: La Mega (Pop music), Rumba Stereo (Reggaeton), Amor Stereo, Antena 2 (sport broadcasting to 20 cities countrywide), La Cariñosa, El Sol, La FM and Radio Uno (Vallenato).

== Television ==
Colombia has five national and many local and regional television channels. The National Television Authority oversees television programming. National Radio and Television of Colombia (Radio Televisión Nacional de Colombia —RTVC), Colombia's public broadcaster, oversees three national television stations (one public-commercial, one institutional, and one educational). Television stations include:

- Caracol Televisión: General programming. Founded in 1969 by Fernando Londoño Henao, Cayetano Betancourt, Carlos Sanz de Santamaría and Pedro Navas as a production company. It's a national network since 1998.
- RCN Televisión: General programming. Founded in 1967 as a production company. It's a national network since 1998.
- Señal Colombia: Cultural and educational broadcasting. Founded in 1970.
- Canal Institucional: Institutional programming. Created in 2004 to replace public-commercial channel Canal A (founded 1972 as Segunda Cadena).
- Canal 1, state-owned national television network, whose programming is provided by private companies. It is the first television station in Colombia, founded in 1954.

Regional and local stations include:

- Canal Capital: Local state-run channel to Bogotá
- Citytv: Local private channel to Bogotá
- Teleantioquia: Regional channel based in Medellín and covers the Antioquia Department
- Telepacífico: Regional channel based in Cali. Covers the Pacific region
- Telecafé: Regional channel based in Manizales, coverage in the Colombian Coffee-Growers Axis
- Telecaribe: Regional channel based in Barranquilla, covers the Caribbean Region of Colombia.
- Televisión Regional del Oriente: Regional channel based in Bucaramanga and Cúcuta, covers the departments of Santander and Norte de Santander.
- Teleislas: Regional channel for the San Andrés y Providencia archipelago.
- Canal 13: Regional channel based in Bogotá, covers Cundinamarca, Boyacá, Tolima, Huila, Casanare, Meta, Vichada, Arauca, Caquetá, Guaviare, Vaupés, Amazonas, and Putumayo. Most programming is youth oriented.

== Internet ==
Internet access in Colombia shows a marked increase during the last few years. As September 2009, the web connections surpasses two million, as compared with an estimated total of 900,000 Internet subscribers by the end of 2005. The current figure equated to 17 million Internet users, plus 3.8 million mobile internet users, or 38.5 percent of the 2009 population, as compared with 4,739,000 Internet users in 2005, or 11.5 percent of the 2005 population (10.9 per 100 inhabitants).

== Media ownership ==
Media ownership remains concentrated in the hands of wealthy families, large national conglomerates, or groups associated with one or the other of the two dominant political parties. The first foreign media owner in the country is the Spanish media conglomerate Prisa, which acquired majority ownership of the country's largest radio network. There are public television and radio networks and two news agencies (Ciep–El País and Colprensa).

== Freedom of the press ==
The law provides for freedom of speech and of the press, and the government generally has respected these rights in practice. Although security forces generally have not subjected journalists to harassment, intimidation, or violence, there have been exceptions, as well as reports of threats and violence against journalists by corrupt officials. Colombian journalists practice self-censorship to avoid reprisals by corrupt officials, criminals, and members of illegal armed groups. In the fifth annual Reporters Without Borders Worldwide Press Freedom Index published in October 2006, Colombia ranked 131 of a total of 168 countries, a decline from its 2005 ranking of 128. More than 80 journalists have been murdered in the past decade for doing their jobs. Major international wire services, newspapers, and television networks have a presence in the country and generally operate free of government interference.

== See also ==
- Communications in Colombia
