= Television in Colombia =

Television live broadcast in Inravisión studios during the mid-1960s (Bogotá), where the first Colombian television shows were produced

Television in Colombia or Colombian television (Spanish: Televisión de Colombia) is a media of Colombia. It is characterized for broadcasting telenovelas, series, game shows and TV news. Until 1998 it was a state monopoly (though there was a short-lived local private channel from 1966 to 1971, known as Teletigre). There are two privately owned TV networks and three state-owned TV networks with national coverage, as well as six regional TV networks and dozens of local TV stations. There are numerous cable TV companies operating in Colombia under each Colombian department statutes. These cable companies also develop their own channels, in addition to a variety of international channels. Television in Colombia has always relied on technological advancements from developed countries importing almost all the equipment.

== History ==
Schedule of the first Colombian television broadcast

- National Anthem - Orquesta Sinfónica de Colombia
- Speech by President Gustavo Rojas Pinilla
- Tele News
- Recital: Violin: Frank Preuss, Piano: Hilda Adler
- Documentary
- El niño del pantano, TV adaptation of a tale by Bernardo Romero Lozano, produced by Gaspar Árias
- Film
- Estampas colombianas, comical sketch by Álvaro Monroy
- Film sent by the United Nations: Report with Colombians in New York City
- Ballet from the Kiril Pikieris Academy
- Tele-final
- National Anthem

Television in Colombia was inaugurated on 13 June 1954 during the government of General Gustavo Rojas Pinilla, who became impressed with the new invention during a visit to Nazi Germany as a military attaché. Rojas imported Siemens and DuMont equipment and hired Cuban technicians to set up a TV station in time for the commemoration of Rojas's first year in office. A test broadcast was made 1 May 1954 covering Bogotá and Manizales.

=== Early years ===
Initially television in Colombia was public. Unlike elsewhere in Latin America, broadcasts emphasized education and cultural topics instead of telenovelas. In 1955, the government developed a system of concessions, in which the State was in charge of the television infrastructure and gave programming slots in the channels to private companies known as programadoras. These companies bid for timeslots on the national channel to show their programs. The first of these companies to be founded was Producciones PUNCH, followed by RTI Colombia. In 1963 Inravisión, the public broadcaster, was created. Before that, it was operated by the Televisora Nacional, part of the Radiodifusora Nacional de Colombia. In 1966 the government then tried to privatize the sector, opening bidding for a private license in Bogotá. Caracol, RTI and Punch would bid on the license, but the winner was Consuelo Salgar de Montejo and her Teletigre. Teletigre was a huge success. Montejo made an alliance with ABC and brought many of the US shows translated into Spanish to the local viewers. The government did not renew the broadcast license for Teletigre. Teletigre, which would return to state hands and become Tele 9 Corazón and, in 1972 Segunda Cadena, with national coverage. Montejo attempted on many occasions to get back in broadcasting TV, but the government refused to give her slots.

=== Color broadcasts ===
On 1 December 1979, regular color television broadcasts started in Colombia using the NTSC standard. Color television had already been introduced in October 1973, when programadora Cenpro Televisión made a color broadcast during an education seminar with Japanese-made equipment. The inauguration and the first match of the 1974 FIFA World Cup were broadcast live in color, but they could be seen in color only on big screens in Bogotá and Cali.

In the 1970s and 1980s, the Colombian national television system had three national channels: Cadena Uno, Cadena Dos and Cadena Tres. The first two worked under the concessions system while the Cadena Tres (later renamed to Señal Colombia) remained under complete government control and focused on cultural and educational programming, and was the producer of major national holiday coverage for the Inravision system.

In 1984, the first of the regional networks in the country was created, Teleantioquia which signed on the next year. Other regional networks, such as Telecaribe and Telepacífico, were created by the then-Minister of Communications Noemí Sanín. In the 1990s Teveandina, Telecafé, and Teleislas would join them.

1987 saw the introduction of cable television to the country after bidding in 1985. TV Cable Bogotá, the country's first cable system, began operations at the end of December 1987. Cheaper satellite dishes systems, which would end up being collectively known as perubólicas during its 1990s heyday, proliferated all over the country and, due to legal issues, some of them would regularise by merging and becoming cable operators.

The 1991 bid (for the 1992-1997 period) triggered competitiveness as a first step toward privatization. Cadena Dos became Canal A, and the programming companies, which numbered 24 at the time, received from that point slots on one channel to compete among each other for ratings. Cadena Uno would be rebranded Canal Uno in January 1998.

The Colombian Constitution of 1991 and a law in 1995 created the Comisión Nacional de Television (CNTV, National Television Commission), an autonomous entity in charge of policies for public television and regulation of television contents. The CNTV started working in 1995. In March 1993, more ratings information came to Colombian screens. A court decision forced Inravisión to ban sexual and violent scenes from the franja familiar (family block). Programadoras were now required to state if the program was appropriate for minors to view. In addition, programadoras had to submit their material to Inravisión 72 hours in advance to determine its suitability; television was classified in two types of franjas, including the franja infantil and franja familiar (which determined the content rating of the programs to be aired in that block) as well as ratings for the profitability and value of the timeslots, ranging from AAA (prime time) to D (overnight hours).

In 1997, the government through the CNTV gave away licences to set up privately owned television networks. These licences were granted to Cadena radial colombiana (Caracol TV) and Radio Cadena Nacional (RCN TV), which had started as radio networks and were in the hands of the main economic groups of Colombia. Both private stations began functioning as TV networks on 10 July 1998.

The recession of the Colombian economy during the late 1990s weakened the state-run networks and the programadoras. But the companies that produced the networks' shows also had to face a new landscape of Colombian television, as Caracol and RCN now dominated. Ratings fell steadily as the programadoras became merely production companies for Caracol or RCN or disappeared outright. Names famous in Colombian television, like PUNCH, Cenpro, Producciones JES (named for its founder Julio E. Sánchez Venegas), the famous Noticiero 24 Horas, and TeVecine, left the public airwaves. Others required financial intervention to stay afloat. The programadoras had continued working independently and never collaborated to establish a better program service against the newly organized privately owned networks.

By 2003, Canal A was almost entirely filled with cultural and educational programs produced by the government-run programadora (Audiovisuales). In 2003, the only production company left on Canal A was transferred to Canal Uno, which left four programadoras there to receive an equal share of the channel's program slots. Canal A then was turned into the Canal Institucional and became under total control of the government. Later in 2004, Inravisión would be liquidated and Radio Televisión Nacional de Colombia was created.

In 2009 a licence for a third national private television network was to be granted by the Colombian government. Spanish groups PRISA and Planeta, and Venezuelan tycoon Gustavo Cisneros were bidding, each of them allied with Colombian shareholders, for the licence. As of July 2020, there is still no third private channel in Colombia.

== Digital television ==
On August 28, 2008, Colombia adopted the European digital terrestrial television standard, DVB-T using MPEG4 H.264 and a channel bandwidth of 6 MHz.

On December 28, 2010, Caracol TV and RCN TV officially started digital broadcasts for Bogotá, Medellín and surrounding areas on channels 14 and 15 UHF using DVB-T h264. Señal Colombia and Canal Institucional started test digital broadcasts earlier in 2010.

On January 9, 2012 Colombia adopted the latest European digital terrestrial television standard, DVB-T2, using a channel bandwidth of 6 MHz. The reneging on their earlier decision to use DVB-T meant that many early adopters were left with incompatible set top boxes and televisions. The transmitters in Bogotá and Medellín transmitted DVB-T2 and DVB-T in parallel (T2 started on 1 August 2012) for three years. DVB-T from these two masts was switched off in August 2015. The TV transmitters in Barranquilla and Cali were the first T2 only enabled transmitters; these started in May 2012. As with Barranquilla and Cali, all other masts will be DVB-T2 only.

As of June 2020, there are around 40 state owned DVB-T2 masts (RTVC) and around 150 private DVB-T2 masts (CCNP: 149, Citytv: 1).

== Programming ==
Network	Coverage	Type
Caracol TV	National	private
RCN TV	National	private
Canal 1	National	mixed (operated by a private consortium, its concession and transmitter network belong to the Colombian government)
Canal Institucional	National	public
Señal Colombia	National	public
Teleantioquia	Regional: Antioquia Department	public
Canal 13	Regional: Bogotá, the southeastern part of the Andean region, and all Orinoquia and Amazon regions	public
Canal Capital	Regional: Bogotá	public
Citytv	Regional: Bogotá	private/local
Caucavisión	Regional: Cauca Department	private/cable
Telecaribe	Regional: Caribbean Region of Colombia	public
Telecafé	Regional: Colombian Coffee-Growers Axis	public
Teleislas	Regional: San Andrés y Providencia Department	public
Canal TRO	Regional: Santander Department	public
Telepacífico	Regional: Pacific Region of Colombia	public
Telemedellín	Regional: Antioquia Department	mixed (managed by public and private universities in Medellín)
Canal U	Regional: Antioquia Department	public
Enlace Piedemonte Canal 2	Regional: Casanare	private/cable

== International channels ==
Logo	Channel	Programming	Participating channels	Owner	Payment operator company
	Caracol Internacional	Generalist	Caracol Televisión	Valorem	All (according the operator by country)
	RCN Nuestra Tele Internacional	Generalist	RCN Televisión	Organización Ardila Lülle	All (according the operator by country)

== Most viewed channels ==
Position	Channel	Share of total viewing (%)
1	Caracol TV	14.5
2	RCN TV	13.9
3	Canal 1	4.5
4	Señal Colombia	3.3
5	Canal Capital	2.5
6	Citytv	1.9
7	Canal Trece	1.4
8	Teleantioquia	0.9
9	Telepacífico	0.8
10	Canal Institucional	0.6

== See also ==
- Media of Colombia
- List of Colombian television series
- Television content rating systems in Colombia
- Television in Latin America
