= 2007 Pan American Games =

15th edition of the Pan American Games

XV Pan American Games
- Host city: Rio de Janeiro
- Country: Brazil
- Motto: Live this energy! Portuguese: Viva essa energia!
- Nations: 42
- Athletes: 5,633
- Events: 334 in 34 sports
- Opening: July 13
- Closing: July 29
- Opened by: Chairman Carlos Nuzman
- Cauldron lighter: Joaquim Cruz
- Main venue: Maracanã Stadium

The 2007 Pan American Games, officially known as the XV Pan American Games (Portuguese: XV Jogos Pan-Americanos) and commonly known as Rio 2007, were a major continental multi-sport event that took place in Rio de Janeiro, Brazil, from July 13 to 29, 2007. A total of 5,633 athletes from 42 National Olympic Committees (NOCs) competed in 332 events in 34 sports and in 47 disciplines. During the Games, 95 new Pan American records were set; 2,196 medals were awarded; 1,262 doping control tests were performed and about 15,000 volunteers participated in the organization of the event, which served as an Olympic qualification occasion for 13 International Federations (IFs).

Rio de Janeiro was awarded the Games over San Antonio, Texas, United States, on August 24, 2002, having won an absolute majority of votes (30–21) from the 51 members of the Pan American Sports Organization (PASO) in the first round of voting during the XL PASO General Assembly held in Mexico City, Mexico. This was the first Games held in Brazil since the 1963 Pan American Games that took place in São Paulo. According to the Rio de Janeiro Organizing Committee, the Games called for the implementation of the country's largest organizational and logistic operation ever until the 2011 Military World Games, and that organization turned to be the path to Rio became host of the 2016 Summer Olympics.

== Bidding process ==
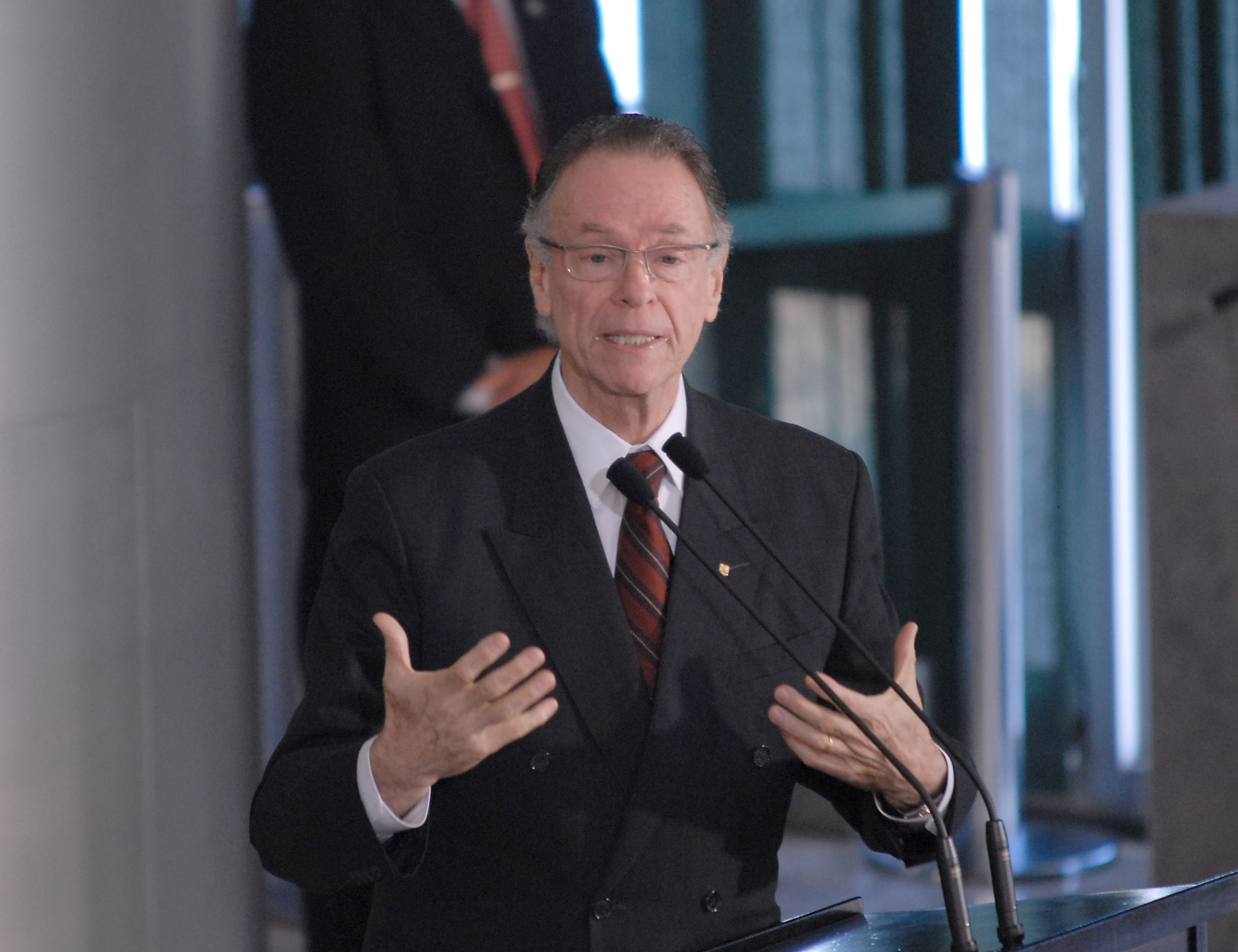
Carlos Arthur Nuzman, chairman of the Rio de Janeiro bid for the 2007 Pan American Games.

The official bid was submitted in August 2001 during the XXXIX Pan American Sports Organization (PASO) General Assembly held in Santo Domingo, Dominican Republic. In April 2002, following delivery of Federal, State and City Government and BOC letters confirming country, state, city and Brazilian sport compliance with the applicable Games regulations, PASO announced the approval of Rio de Janeiro's bid. The Bidding Committee then submitted a detailed bid file for the Games. The document was prepared and developed with the assistance of Fundação Getúlio Vargas (FGV), which had been commissioned by Rio de Janeiro's City Government. In the running to host the 2007 Pan American Games, Rio de Janeiro faced off with the city of San Antonio, United States; which previously beat Houston, Miami, and Raleigh to become the American candidate.

According to PASO statute and regulations, the host city was selected by direct voting during the XL PASO General Assembly held in Mexico City, Mexico, on August 24, 2002. The candidate city that received the simple majority of votes from representatives of the 42 member National Olympic Committees (NOCs) would be awarded the right to host the competition. The announcement was made by PASO President Mario Vázquez Raña. Rio de Janeiro received 30 votes against 21 from San Antonio. Marked by a professional strategy that included the showing of city and project videos, Rio de Janeiro's campaign convinced the majority of voters, accounting for a total 51 votes. The 39-member Brazilian delegation erupted into boisterous celebration celebrating the country's highest achievement in terms of sporting event organization.

XL General Assembly; Pan American Sports Organization; August 24, 2002, in Mexico City, Mexico.
City	Nation	Round 1
Rio de Janeiro	Brazil	30
San Antonio	United States	21

== Medal count ==
* Host nation (Brazil)

Rank	NOC	Gold	Silver	Bronze	Total
1	United States	97	88	52	237
2	Cuba	59	35	41	135
3	Brazil*	52	40	65	157
4	Canada	39	44	55	138
5	Mexico	18	24	31	73
6	Colombia	14	20	13	47
7	Venezuela	12	23	35	70
8	Argentina	11	16	33	60
9	Dominican Republic	6	6	17	29
10	Chile	6	5	9	20
11–32	Remaining	19	31	60	110
Totals (32 entries)		333	332	411	1,076

== Mascot ==
Cauê

The organization of the Rio 2007 Games has chosen the figure of the Sun to represent the event. And, in a decision never taken before, it has defined it as the single mascot of the Pan American and Parapan American Games, such as the Brazilian common expression, that the "Sol Brilha para Todos" (The sun shines for everyone), reinforcing thus the all human rights and that, like the sun, sport and the life are for all.

The character reflects the main characteristics of the host city (call as "harmonic diversity between humanity and nature") and harmonizes with the graphic work developed for the logo and the visual identity of both Games. The name was chosen through popular voting by Internet, cellular phone messages and public ballot boxes placed around the main Brazilian cities, causing great commotion. Over 1.2 million people participated in the election, and the name Cauê received almost half of the votes.

Traditionally used in large sport events, the mascot figure serves the purpose of cheering the event, enforcing the playful aspect of sports and captivating spectators and athletes. The mascot's main choice is to transmit messages of peace, respect to the environment, friendship and brotherhood, which are intrinsic values to the Olympic Movement.

== Torch relay ==
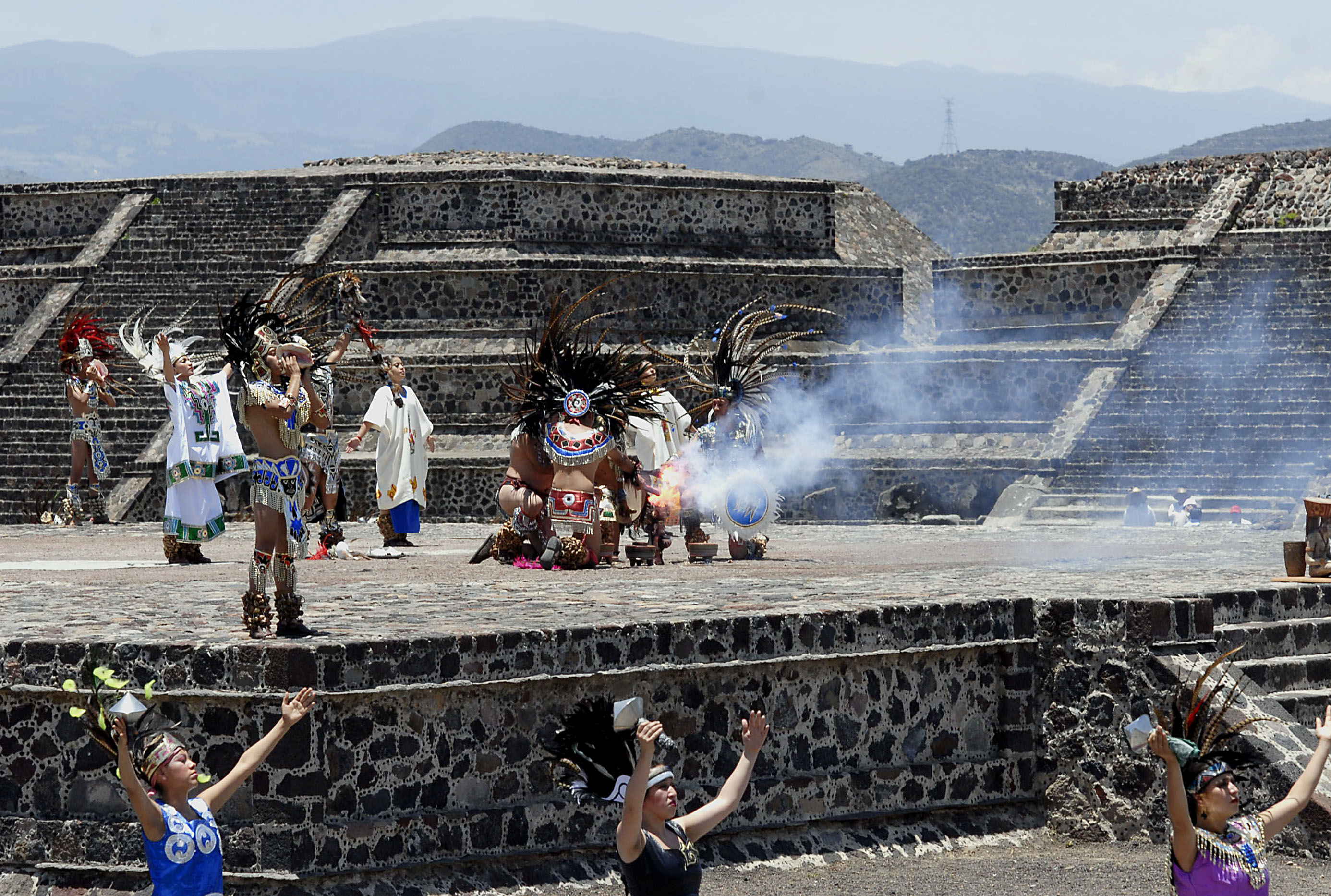
A ceremony is held at the Teotihuacan pyramids to light the torch.

The 2007 Pan American Games torch relay was a 39-day torch run, from June 5 to July 13, 2007, held prior to the games. On June 4, the torch was lit at the torch lighting ceremony in Teotihuacán, Mexico. The flame was then taken by a Brazilian Air Force craft to Porto Seguro Airport and an indigenous welcome ceremony was held in Santa Cruz Cabrália, Bahia, Brazil, where the torch relay began.

== Opening ceremony ==
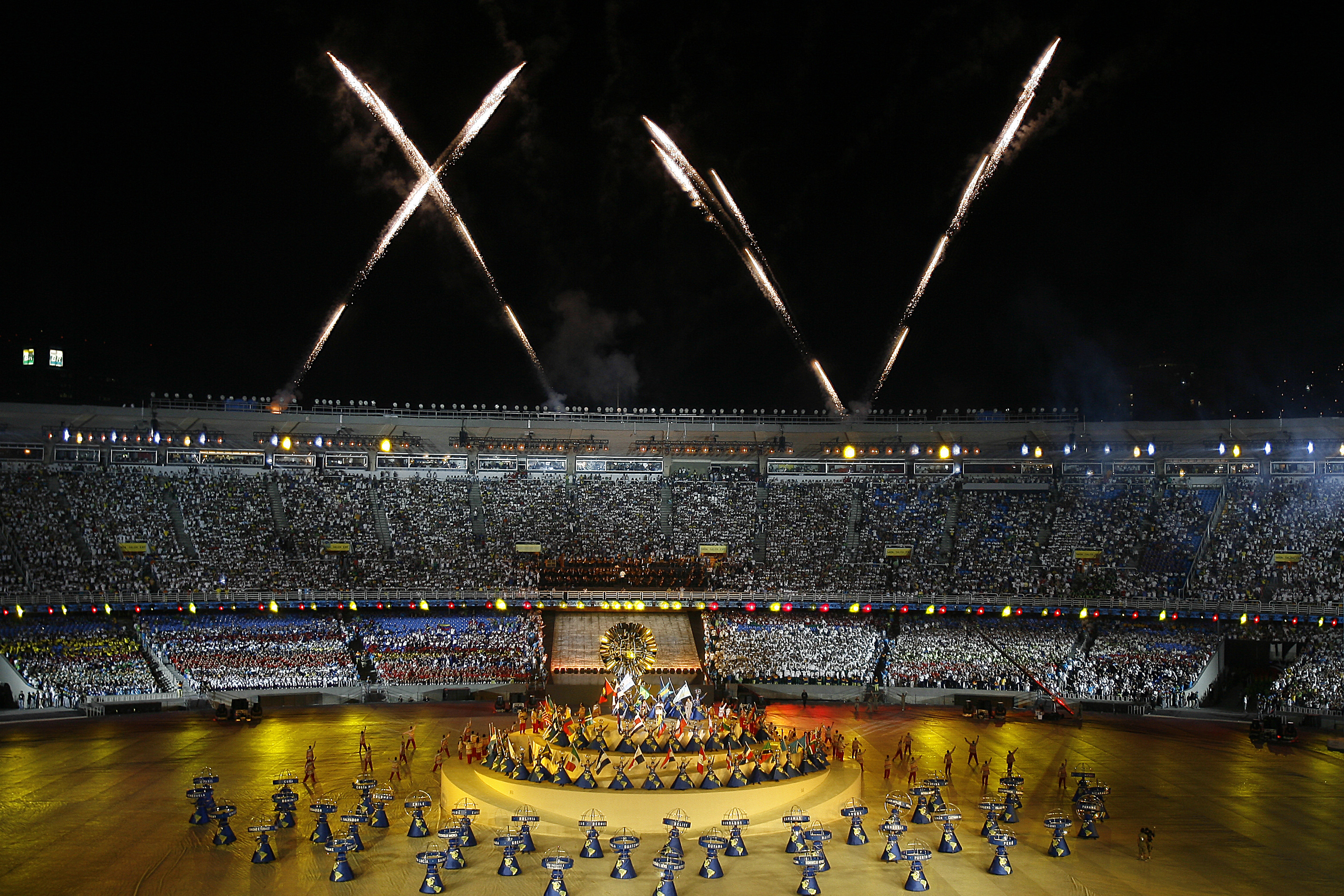
The Opening ceremony. Fireworks forming the number 15, of fifteen editions of the games in Roman numerals.

The opening ceremony of the XV Pan American Games took place on July 13, 2007. Approximately 90,000 people packed Rio de Janeiro's Maracanã Stadium for the occasion. The ceremony included a cast of 7,000 and a multimillion-dollar budget, being produced by Scott Givens. Over 800 people were part of the creative and production teams working on the opening ceremony, team welcome ceremonies, sports production, the presentation of 2,252 medals, sports production, the closing ceremony and ParaPan ceremonies.

The show began at 05:30 pm (local time, UTC-3) and lasted for two and a half hours. The theme of the show was based on the theme of the Rio 2007 Games: Viva Essa Energia (Share the Energy) and the oath of the athletes was performed by Brazilian Taekwondo athlete Natália Falavigna. Also, a very abbreviated version of the Olympic Anthem was played.

Contrary to plan, the games were not opened by Brazil's head of state, President Luiz Inácio Lula da Silva, but by the head of the Brazilian Olympic Committee, Carlos Nuzman. Prior to the official opening, Lula had been constantly booed whenever the in-stadium camera showed his image or when his name was mentioned.

== Venues ==
The competitions were carried through in a ray of 25 km, spread for four polar regions in the city.

- Marapendi Club – Tennis
- City of Sports Complex – Basketball, Cycling (track), Artistic Gymnastics, Swimming, Synchronised swimming, Roller Skating (Speed and Diving).
- Outeiro Hill – Cycling (Mountain Bike and BMX).
- Riocentro Complex (IBC/MPC) – Badminton, Boxing, Fencing, Futsal, Rhythmic Gymnastics and Trampoline, Handball, Judo, Weightlifting, Wrestling, Taekwondo and Table Tennis.
- City of Rock – Baseball and Softball.
- Barra Bowling Center – Bowling.
- Zico Football Center (CFZ) – Football (soccer).
- Miécimo da Silva Complex – Football (soccer), Karate, Roller Skating (Artistics) and Squash.
- Deodoro Military Club – Equestrian (Dressage, Eventing, Jumping), field hockey, Modern Pentathlon, Sport Shooting and Archery.
- João Havelange Stadium – Athletics and Football (soccer).
- Maracanã Stadium – Football (soccer), Water Polo and Volleyball.
- Marina da Glória – Sailing.
- Flamengo Park – Athletics (Marathon and Race Walking) and Cycling (road).
- Copacabana Arena – Swimming Marathon, Triathlon and Beach Volleyball.
- Rowing Stadium of the Lagoon – Canoe flatwater and Rowing.
- Caiçaras Club – Water skiing.

Main construction work of the 2007 Pan American Games, the João Havelange Olympic Stadium hosted the athletics and football competitions. The stadium is one of the major Games' legacies to the city of Rio de Janeiro, which can since then count on a modern stadium with full capacity to be used for sports and cultural events. The City of Sports Complex counts on modern constructions such as the Rio Olympic Arena, where the Games' basketball and artistic gymnastics competitions were held; the Maria Lenk Aquatic Park, venue for the swimming, synchronized swimming and diving competitions; and the Barra Velodrome, where the track cycling and speed skating events took place. Riocentro Convention Center is the largest expositions and fairs center of Latin America, for the 2007 Games, the complex held temporary facilities for staging several sport disciplines, including in the Parapan American Games. The Miécimo da Silva Sports Complex is the largest sports complex owned by a City Government (City Hall) in Brazil. Several large sports events took place at this venue, such as the basketball exhibition game between the teams of American Magic Johnson and Brazilian Oscar Schmidt, in addition to several matches of the Brazilian Futsal team. The Deodoro Military Club is a traditional Brazilian Army sport facility in Rio de Janeiro, will host the Rio 2007 Games equestrian, field hockey, modern pentathlon, sport shooting and archery competitions.

The Maracanã Stadium was built for the 1950 FIFA World Cup, the Mario Filho Stadium (internationally known as Maracanã) is one of the most famous stadiums in the world, receiving a great number of Brazilian and foreign tourists annually. The stadium staged the opening and closing ceremonies and football matches, including the finals. The Maracanãzinho Gymnasium is the house of the Rio 2007 volleyball competitions. The Julio Delamare Water Park is the stage for the water polo tournament in the Games. The Maracanã Sports Complex also includes the Celio de Barros Athletics Stadium, and it is administered by the Rio de Janeiro State Government.

Also known as Aterro do Flamengo, the Flamengo Park is the largest leisure area of the city. Besides Marina da Glória, the main venue for the Rio 2007 sailing competitions. During the Games, the marathon (men's and women's) arrival points set up at the Flamengo Park, which also staged the race walking and road cycling competitions.

== Sports ==
Even with the celebrated victory, tensions involved the organizing committee and PASO, since the beginning of the candidacy, there was a proposal not to include any sport or optional event in the Games program, respecting the program of the 2008 Summer Olympic Games, the only exception to this would be the addition of futsal, which had already been confirmed as an optional sport during the first phases of the project. After tense rounds of negotiations held between August 24, 2002 and May 2005, it was decided that only the 5 sports proposed in the Pan-American Charter would be included in the Games program.(bowling, karate, squash, water skiing and roller sports) to the program while racquetball and basque pelota were dropped were replaced by futsal. However, this edition had a relatively smaller program with 1 less sport than four years before and four fewer finals. But even so, several new events such as 10 km marathon swim, men's wakeboarding in water skiing, the 3000 meter steeplechase in women's athletics and an additional class in sailing were contested. Even so, there were reductions in the number of finals in rowing and shooting.

- Aquatics
  - Diving (8)
  - Swimming (34)
  - Synchronized swimming (2)
  - Water polo (2)
- Archery (4)
- Athletics (47)
- Badminton (5)
- Baseball (1)
- Basketball (2)
- Bowling (4)
- Boxing (11)
- Canoeing
  - Canoe sprint (12)
- Cycling
  - BMX (2)
  - Mountain biking (2)
  - Road (4)
  - Track (10)
- Equestrian
  - Dressage (2)
  - Eventing (2)
  - Jumping (2)
- Fencing (10)
- Field hockey (2)
- Football (2)
- Futsal (1)
- Gymnastics
  - Artistic (14)
  - Rhythmic (8)
  - Trampolining (2)
- Handball (2)
- Judo (14)
- Karate (9)
- Modern pentathlon (2)
- Roller skating (6)
- Rowing (13)
- Sailing (9)
- Shooting (15)
- Softball (1)
- Squash (4)
- Table tennis (4)
- Taekwondo (8)
- Tennis (4)
- Triathlon (2)
- Volleyball
  - Volleyball (2)
  - Beach volleyball (2)
- Water skiing (7)
- Weightlifting (15)
- Wrestling
  - Freestyle (11)
  - Greco-Roman (7)

== Participating nations ==
Participating countries.

Nation	Athletes	Appearances
Antigua and Barbuda	9	7
Argentina	441	14
Aruba	25	5
Bahamas	86	14
Barbados	65	14
Belize	7	10
Bermuda	19	11
Bolivia	43	14
Brazil	659	14
British Virgin Islands	10	6
Canada	495	14
Cayman Islands	12	7
Chile	229	14
Colombia	307	14
Costa Rica	51	14
Cuba	470	14
Dominica	13	3
Dominican Republic	171	14
Ecuador	150	14
El Salvador	86	13
Grenada	15	5
Guatemala	164	14
Guyana	14	14
Haiti	38	11
Honduras	60	8
Jamaica	147	14
Mexico	400	14
Netherlands Antilles	52	13
Nicaragua	55	11
Panama	70	14
Paraguay	71	14
Peru	93	14
Puerto Rico	209	14
Saint Kitts and Nevis	29	3
Saint Lucia	14	3
Saint Vincent and the Grenadines	14	4
Suriname	18	10
Trinidad and Tobago	75	14
United States	595	14
Virgin Islands	50	5
Uruguay	173	10
Venezuela	382	14

== Broadcasting ==
- Argentina : Canal 7 Argentina
- Bolivia : Radio y Television Boliviana
- Brazil : Rede Bandeirantes, Rede Globo, Rede Record, BandSports, ESPN Brasil, Sportv
- Canada : CTV Sports
- Chile : Canal 13, TVN
- Colombia : Canal Capital, Canal 13, Canal TRO, Teleantioquia, Telecafé, Telecaribe, Teleislas, Telepacífico, Señal Colombia
- Dominican Republic : Tele Antillas
- Ecuador : Gamavision, Teleamazonas
- European Union : Eurosport
- El Salvador : Telecorporación Salvadoreña
- Mexico : ESPN Deportes, Televisa
- Panama : RPC TV-canal 4TV MAX-Canal 9
- Peru : America TV, Panamericana Television
- United States : ESPN
- Uruguay : Teledoce
- Venezuela : Meridiano TV

== Calendar ==
OC	Opening ceremony	●	Event competitions	1	Event finals	CC	Closing ceremony

July	12 Thu	13 Fri	14 Sat	15 Sun	16 Mon	17 Tue	18 Wed	19 Thu	20 Fri	21 Sat	22 Sun	23 Mon	24 Tue	25 Wed	26 Thu	27 Fri	28 Sat	29 Sun	Events
Ceremonies		OC																CC	
Archery												●	●	●	1	1	2		4
Athletics											3	5	6	9		10	13	1	47
Badminton			●	●	●	●	2	3											5
Baseball			●	●	●	●	●	1											1
Basketball									●	●	●	●	1	●	●	●	●	1	2
Bowling												●	2	●	2				4
Boxing									●	●	●	●	●	●		5	6		11
Canoeing														●	●	6	6		12
Cycling			2	4	●	1	5	4		2									18
Diving														2	2	2	2		8
Equestrian			●	2	●		1		●	●	1				●	1		1	6
Fencing			1	1	1	1	1	1	2	2									10
Field hockey				●	●	●	●	●	●	●	●		1	1					2
Football (men's women's)	●		●	●	●		●		●	●		●	●		1	1			2
Futsal												●	●	●		●	1		1
Gymnastics			2	1	1	10						●			●	2	8		24
Handball		●	●	●	●	●	●	●	●	1	1								2
Judo								2	4	4	4								14
Karate														3	3	3			9
Modern pentathlon												1	1						2
Roller skating										●	2		●	4					6
Rowing			●	●	●	5	4	4											13
Sailing											●	●	●		●	●	9		9
Shooting				3	3	3	1	3	●	2									15
Softball												●	●	●	●	●	1		2
Squash			●	●	2	●	●	2											4
Swimming			2		●	4	7	4	6	4	7								34
Synchronized swimming														●	●	1	1		2
Table tennis											●	●	1	1	●	1	1		4
Taekwondo			2	2	2	2													8
Tennis							●	●	●	●	2	●	●	●	●	●	2		4
Triathlon				2															2
Volleyball			●	●	●		●	2				●	●	●		●	2		4
Water polo			●	●	●	●	●	●	1	●	●	●		●	1				2
Water skiing										●	●	3	4						7
Weightlifting			3	3	3	3	3												15
Wrestling													4	3	4	4	3		18
Total Events			12	18	13	29	24	26	12	16	21	9	20	23	14	37	57	3	334
July	12 Thu	13 Fri	14 Sat	15 Sun	16 Mon	17 Tue	18 Wed	19 Thu	20 Fri	21 Sat	22 Sun	23 Mon	24 Tue	25 Wed	26 Thu	27 Fri	28 Sat	29 Sun	Events

== See also ==
- 2007 Parapan American Games
- 2011 Military World Games
- 2016 Summer Olympics
- 2014 FIFA World Cup
- 2019 Copa América

Preceded by Santo Domingo	XV Pan American Games; Rio de Janeiro (2007)	Succeeded by Guadalajara
