= List of local television stations in South America =

This is a list of local television stations in South America, including commercial, community and government-operated stations.

== Argentina ==
- América
- Canal 7 Argentina
- Canal 9
- Telefé
- Canal 13

== Bolivia ==
- ATB
- Bolivision
- TVN (Televisión Nacional de Bolivia)
- Red Uno de Bolivia
- Unitel Bolivia

== Brazil ==
- Bandeirantes
- Rede Globo
- Record (TV network)
- Rede TV
- SBT (Sistema Brasileiro de Televisão)
- TVE (Televisão Educativa)
- TV Cultura (State of São Paulo government television network)

== Chile ==
- Telecanal
- Red Televisión
- UCV TV
- TVN (Televisión Nacional de Chile)
- Mega
- Chilevisión
- Canal 13 (UC TV)
- Mas Canal 22

== Colombia ==
- Caracol TV
- RCN Televisión
- Canal Uno
- Señal Institucional
- Señal Colombia
- Teleantioquia
- Canal 13
- Canal Capital
- Citytv Bogota
- Caucavisión
- Telecaribe
- Telecafé
- Teleislas
- Televisión
- Telepacífico
- Telemedellín
- Canal U

== Peru ==
- America TV
- Andina TV
- CM Deportes
- Canal 33
- Canal N
- Congress Channel
- Frecuencia Latina
- Guia TV
- OKTV Peru
- Panamericana Televisión
- Plus TV
- Red Global
- Television Nacional del Perú
- Uranio TV

== Venezuela ==
- List of Venezuelan television channels
