= Región Colombia Internacional =

- Type: Public international television network
- Country: Colombia
- Broadcast area: Colombia

Ownership
- Owner: Government of Colombia

History
- Launched: June 10, 2009

Región Colombia Internacional (RCI) was a Colombian public satellite television channel, created to broadcast programming from the eight regional television channels of the public broadcasting system at an international scale. First announced in 2007, it started broadcasting in June 2009, but shut down not long after.

== History ==
RCI was announced on November 21, 2007, covering the United States and Canada in an initial phase; after that, it would expand to the rest of the world. The member channels were Telecaribe, Teleantioquia, Telepacífico, Canal Capital, Teleislas, Canal 13, Televisión Regional del Oriente and Telecafé. Telecaribe was responsible for playout and uplink. The National Television Council invested COP$612 million in the first phase alone in the acquisition of satellite equipment and covering operational costs.

The channel launched in June 2009. It was seen as a counterweight to Caracol Internacional and TV Colombia, which only broadcast telenovelas and news: RCI's programming was mostly cultural in nature, but also broadcast newscasts from the member channels. A new block of programming started every day at 2pm, taking into account time differences between Spain and the United States. The channel was also distributed on cable companies in Colombia, such as Une, where it was carried on channel 102.

The cause of its closure in 2011 is unknown.
