= List of broadcasting companies in Latin America =

Below is a list of TV companies in Latin America, followed by the network's slogan.

== Argentina ==
- Telefe - Siempre Juntos
- Artear - Prendete al Trece
- Ideas del Sur
- Pol-Ka

== Brazil ==
- Rede Globo - A gente se liga em você
- Rede Record - Se tem Brasil, tem Record no ar
- SBT - #Compartilhe
- Rede Bandeirantes - Tá todo mundo aqui
- RedeTV! - A rede de TV que mais cresce no Brasil!

== Bolivia ==
- Bolivia TV - el Canal del Estado Plurinacional de Bolivia
- Red ATB - La red que más se ve
- Bolivisión - Somos parte de tí
- Red Unitel - Unidos por la tele
- Red Uno - La alegría es naranja
- Red PAT - Crecemos juntos

== Chile ==
- TVN - El Canal de Chile
- Canal 13 - Por el 13, El Canal de los Realities
- MEGA - Mi Mega
- CHV - Te Ve De Verdad
- La RED - na' que ver

== Colombia ==
- Caracol TV - Mas Cerca de Ti
- RCN TV - Nuestra Tele
- RTI Producciones
- Señal Colombia
- Señal Institucional
- Canal Uno

=== Regional and Local Station ===
- Canal Capital
- Citytv
- Telepacifico
- Telecaribe
- Televisión Regional del Oriente
- Canal 13
- CMB Televisión

=== International ===
- Caracol TV Internacional
- RCN Nuestra Tele

== Costa Rica ==
- Teletica - Siempre Con Usted
- Repretel - Somos Como Vos

== Mexico ==
- Televisa
  - Las Estrellas - El Canal de las Estrellas nuestro canal
  - Canal 5 - #PorqueSí
  - Gala TV - Más de lo que sientes
  - FOROtv - Tú tienes la palabra
- TV Azteca
  - Azteca 7 - Te damos de qué hablar
  - Azteca Uno - Todos somos uno
  - adn40 - Activa tu mente
- Grupo Imagen
  - Imagen Televisión - Juntos Somos Libres
- Grupo Multimedios
  - Multimedios Television - El Canal Que Todos Vemos
  - Milenio Television - Milenio Television

== Paraguay ==
- Telefuturo

== Uruguay ==
- SAETA TV Canal 10
- Tenfield

== Venezuela ==
- RCTV - Marca el Paso
- Venevisión - Como tú
- Televen - Tu Canal
