= Uribe DJ =

Uribe Dj
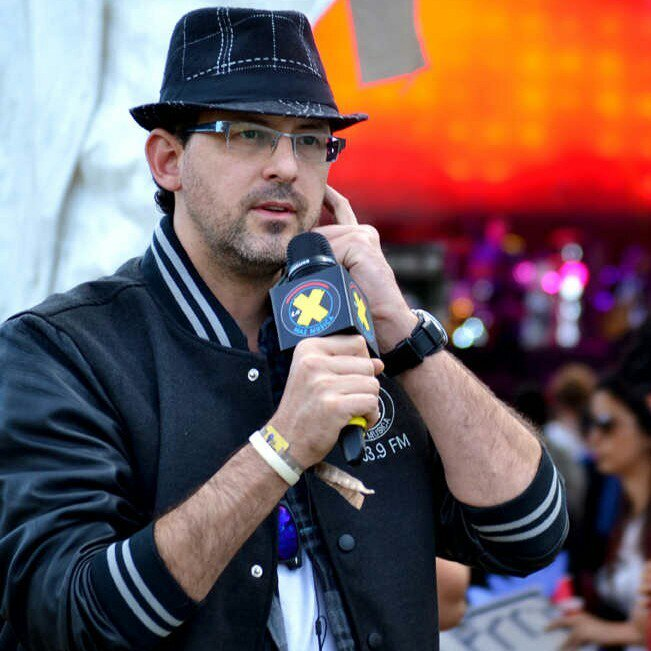
- Uribe DJ broadcasting from Estéreo Picnic Festival 2014
- Born: Álvaro Uribe; March 9, 1973 (age 53); Cali, Colombia
- Occupation: Radio person
- Years active: 1996–present
- Website: https://uribedj.co

Álvaro Uribe, known as Uribe Dj, (born March 9, 1973) is a Colombian radio personality, Voice-over artist and television host. Uribe has hosted programs on English and Spanish language at radio stations in Colombia like The X 103.9 FM, Movistar Radio, La Mega 90.9 FM and 88.9 FM. In June 2013, he started to host the television show Aldea TIC on Canal Tr3ce.

He is the director of the radio station LA 92 in Colombia and host of the radio show ONE2FIVE on The X 103.9 FM Colombia.

== Radio ==
Uribe was born in Cali, and studied at Pontifical Xavierian University in Bogotá. He started his radio career working for La Mega 90.9 FM in Colombia, where he produced the show "El Mañanero" for ten years.

In 2003 he worked for 88.9 FM as the host of a show called Navegantes.

In 2007 he was the creator and director of "Movistar Radio", an online radio station implemented for the company Movistar - Telefónica of Spain.

In 2010 he became the host of the show "ONE2FIVE" at The X 103.9 FM in Colombia. He is also the Radio programmer for the station.

== Television ==
In television he started working in the early 2000s with RCN TV channel, hosting a show called "Los Elegidos" with Colombian model Catalina Maya and TV presenter Carolina Delgado.

He worked with Caracol TV network, as part of the entertainment department. He was the voice-over and creative writer for the shows "También Caerás", "Wako Wako" and "Animexpress" for almost two years.

In 2003 he was invited as a judge in the reality TV show "Mi Otro Yo" for the channel CityTV.

In 2013 he started hosting the television show "Aldea TIC" on Canal Tr3ce, a show about technology and entertainment.

In late 2020 he created the pop culture show "Pop Corner".

== Awards ==
- Cannes Lions Publicity Awards 2009.

 France, 2009.
 Project: Movistar Radio.
 Brand: Movistar-Telefónica de España. 
 Alongside Sístole publicity agency in Colombia.
 Category: Digital.
 GOLD.

- Cannes Lions Publicity Awards 2013.

 France, 2013. 
 Campaign: ¿What Does ABSOLUT Sounds Like?
 Brand: ABSOLUT. 
 Alongside PHD publicity agency in Colombia.
 Category: Media.
 SILVER.

- P&M Advertising and Marketing Award 2013.

 Colombia, 2013.
 Campaign: ¿What Does ABSOLUT Sounds Like? 
 Brand: ABSOLUT 
 Alongside PHD publicity agency in Colombia.
 Category: Media.
 GOLD.
