= Perubólica =

Retransmission of Peruvian channels in Colombia, particularly during the 1990s

Perubólica (portmanteau of Peru with "parabólica", term used to refer to satellite dishes in Spanish) is a colloquial term referred to Colombian community cable television networks (some illegal) which relay free-to-air satellite television signals from other countries. Although channels from other countries such as Mexico and Brazil were available in its heyday, during the 1990s and early 2000s, Peruvian networks were a staple and became popular among Colombian audiences.

Perubólicas were cheaper alternatives to the then costly cable TV systems, as well as the limitations of the then "mixed system" of the Colombian television and the Inravisión state monopoly which would end in 1998. The foreign channels (Peruvian, Mexican, Brazilian, American) helped Colombians to deal with the limited entertainment options via television they had access to. In 2001, television critic Germán Yances wrote, regarding the Vladivideos scandal during the late Alberto Fujimori administration, that "whatever happens with Peruvian television is a national concern in Colombia, because these channels are a staple of the daily footage millions of Colombian homes receive through satellite dishes". Several Peruvian personalities would become household names in Colombia during the late 20th century and early 21st century and are still fondly remembered more than three decades later.

== Background ==
Until 1998, Colombia's television networks were dominated by Inravisión's three national networks (Canal 1, Canal A and Señal Colombia), as well as its regional networks (Teleantioquia, Telecaribe and Telepacífico). Inravisión's national and regional networks were dependent on programadoras. The government gave licenses to Caracol and RCN Televisión in 1997 and started broadcasting in 1998, greatly debilitating the existing system.

In the early 1990s, Colombia still had a protectionist economy, forbidding foreign brands from entering the country. The opening of the economy was made possible following the approval of the Colombian Constitution of 1991. Before 1991, all over-the-air television in Colombia was under the state's sphere of influence, forbidding private operators from exploring a license. In this context, the Constitution's Law No. 14 oversaw the privatization of the cable network in Bogotá (TVCable, currently owned by Claro) and the exploitation of community cable networks receiving satellite dishes, circulating the channels to apartment blocks, community centers and municipalities. Moreover, Colombia was in a favorable position for satellite communications, which by 1995 had 15,000 systems operating nationwide.

Not all of the systems were legal: in an initial phase, there were systems carrying American cable networks, bypassing copyright rules. The networks that were the most pirated were Cinemax, HBO, Showtime and The Movie Channel, as well as Netlink's The Denver Five package (KWGN, KCNC, KRMA, KMGH, KUSA and TBS. These pirated relays were massively switched off per a June 1992 decision: in September or October, the illegal relays of the premium movie networks were expected to close, while the Denver stations would follow two months later. The decision was taken because most users received the channels in a fraudulent manner, forcing American networks to employ more sophisticated encryption methods. With the vacuum left by the encryption of the US channels, Colombian systems had to resort to signals from other Latin American countries. Early successful channels available on community systems included Venezuelan channels Venevisión and RCTV, El Canal de las Estrellas (its telenovelas were already broadcast in Colombia, but airing one episode a week, unlike in other countries where they aired daily, enabling Televisa's channel to obtain a foothold among Colombian satellite users), TVE Internacional, Rede Globo (where its morning block of cartoons obtained popularity) and Rede Bandeirantes (famous for its late night adult movie block Cine Band Privê). The National Television Council announced in October 1996 that it would legalize all of the over 10,000 systems available.

However, one country stood out from the wave of satellite channels available to Colombian systems: Peruvian channels.

== Peruvian dominance ==
The Peruvian networks were seen as an alternative to the Inravisión channels: its programming was more advanced than Colombia, much like other networks available. Four channels stood out: Frecuencia Latina, América Televisión, Panamericana Televisión and Red Global. The most successful programs were a mix of Peruvian productions and foreign series which would often take longer for the existing channels to obtain. Each channel was known for its line of programming: Panamericana was known for Nubeluz (which even spawned a Colombian dalina, Xiomara "Xiomy" Xibile), original comedy series and the Televisa kids' telenovela Carrusel. At noontime, it aired Aló Gisela with Gisela Valcárcel, which eventually made it to RCN's Yo soy Betty, la fea as a guest star. América was known for Karina y Timoteo, a children's program which aired Japanese anime, well as first-run Mexican telenovelas not yet broadcast in Colombia and Laura en América, which kickstarted Laura Bozzo's path to stardom. Frecuencia Latina (previously Frecuencia 2) was known for feature films (in an initial phase) and later, following a restructuring, cartoons, TV series and talk shows (including Magaly Medina's show before she moved to ATV). Its most popular programs in Colombia's shadow audience were Torbellino and Pataclaun in the late 90s. Global was the least relevant; in the 1990s, when the Perubólicas were at their height, it mainly aired old cartoons and anime.

Universal coverage of the Inravisión networks, the regional channels and the two new private networks left a few areas without reception of local channels, resorting to satellite systems. In areas where no national channels were available, such as Potreritos in Junín, less than one hour away from Bogotá, information on basic Colombian news was receivable only by radio. Even in the Urban area of Junín, locals had to pay for the satellite signals of Canal 1 and Canal A. In 1998, both DirecTV and Sky started broadcasting, enabling reliable nationwide reception of the national channels. In some cases, in order to receive the national channels, especially using the new digital operators, the user would have to cancel the subscription to the shadow system and pay for a monthly subscription of one of the providers. The general consensus over the preference for Peruvian networks in the 1990s was the quality of its reception.

== Legal action ==
Concerns on the installation of such cable systems dates as far back as their implementation. On February 27, 1991, the Ministry of Communications suggested a possible suspension of these networks and the introduction of regulations in Bogotá.

Following the legalization of the two private networks, the National Television Council found that half of the community television systems were found in Bogotá (108 communities), which, in addition to free-to-air channels, carried pirated cable networks. In April 1999, the National Television Council ruled on sanctioning the suspension of around ten television operators, which included TV Ibagué. TV Ibagué appealed to the courts, obtaining a reduced fine. Another company, TV SAT, was hit by the sanction, blocking access to pay-TV channels (among them People & Arts, Discovery Channel, Fox, Cartoon Network, TNT, CNN and MTV), but not the foreign free-to-air services. In parallel to the relays of free-to-air and encrypted channels, these systems have also developed their own in-house channels which required acquisition of rights to certain content, at a price that ended up being higher than maintaining a community cable network. This was a way to circumvent the encryption of pay-TV channels available on regular cable

A May 2000 ruling noted that such systems carried US TV series, such as Ally McBeal, The X-Files and The Simpsons, bypassing international licensing rules, which would cost over US$100 million per month on local television. Viewers watched these series on free-to-air satellite channels (known by the ruling as "incidental" channels) not only from Peru, but also from Ecuador and Bolivia, at no cost. Calls to encrypt these channels were on the cards.

== Influence ==
In addition to the programming, which was qualitatively higher than Colombian TV, viewers were exposed to Peruvian brands during commercial breaks (Inca Kola, D'Onofrio etc.) and some even showed interest in travelling to Peru. Even after the introduction of private television, millions of households were still connected to such networks, at the time of the Vladivideos in 2001. During the height of the Peruvian channels, in the late 1990s, Televisa's Canal 5 also enjoyed popularity.
