= Radio in Colombia =

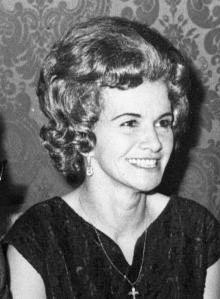
Luisa Mahe Bernal

Radio has been one of Colombia's most popular forms of mass media since the country's first broadcasts in the late 1920s. Although Colombia was predominantly rural country at that time, it was one of the Latin American countries to adopt this technology. During the first decades, most stations focused their programming on news, sports, humour, commentary, and religious instruction, alongside segments promoting political platforms and both popular and classical music, performed live or played from recordings. During the 1930 and 1940, radio stations had radiotheatres where Colombian and internacional artists performed before live audiences.

Radio in Colombia began in the early 1920s when a group of radio amateurs and enthusiasts brought the first receivers into the country, mostly to listen broadcasts from Europe and the United States. Broadcasting began in September 1929 with state-owned HJN, predecessor of Radiodifusora Nacional de Colombia, and the privately run La Voz de Barranquilla (HKD).

Also in 1929, La Voz de la Víctor was inaugurated in Bogotá by Emigdio Velasco, who would later, in 1949, partner with Gabriel Buitrago to found the Discos Atlantic Company, and the Eva record label. La Voz de la Victor was followed La Voz de Antioquia (1931), promoted by the Compañía Colombiana de Radiodifusión, which brought together Coltabaco, Fabricato, Cervecería Unión, Nacional de Chocolates and Café La Bastilla, as well as by Ecos de la Montaña (1931) in Medellín, and Radio Santa Fe (1933) and Emisora Nueva Granada (1933) in Bogotá.

As of 2011, Colombia has three major national radio networks: state-run Radiodifusora Nacional de Colombia and private networks Caracol Radio and RCN Radio, with hundreds of affiliates. These networks appeared in the 1940s.

There are other national networks, including Cadena Super, Todelar, Organización Radial Olímpica, and Colmundo, among others.
