= Enrique Zileri =

Enrique Alberto Zileri Gibson
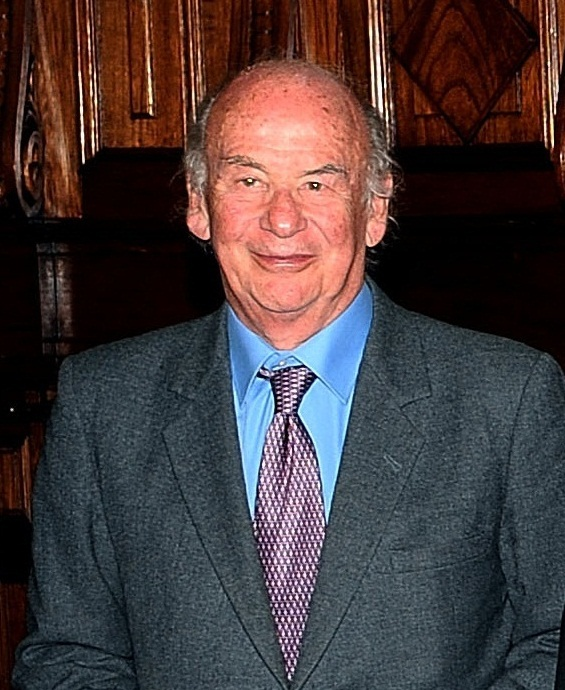
- Born: 4 June 1931; Lima, Peru
- Died: 25 August 2014 (aged 83); Lima, Peru
- Education: Cornell University
- Occupation: Journalist
- Spouse: Daphne Dougall
- Children: 5
- Relatives: Doris Gibson (mother); Manlio Aurelio Zileri Larco (father)
- Writing career
- Language: Spanish
- Notable awards: Maria Moors Cabot Prize (1975)

Enrique Zileri Gibson (Spanish pronunciation: [ẽnˌri.ke siˌle.ɾi ˈxiβ̞.sõn]; 4 June 1931 – 24 August 2014) was the publisher of Caretas (Masks), Peru's leading newsmagazine, which was cofounded by his mother Doris Gibson. He ran the magazine as "a symbol of resistance" against successive Peruvian dictators and their censors. He won many international honours, including the Maria Moors Cabot Prize (1975), but was twice deported by his own government, and the magazine was shut down at least eight times. The Peruvian Nobel laureate Mario Vargas Llosa called him an "indefatigable defender of freedom and democracy" who "could never be bribed or intimidated".

== Early life and career ==
Enrique Zileri Gibson was born on 4 June 1931 in Lima, Peru. His father was Manlio Aurelio Zileri Larco. His mother, Doris Gibson, cofounded the newsmagazine Caretas with Francisco Igartua in October 1950. In childhood, he suffered from tuberculosis. He studied highschool at Taft School in Watertown, Connecticut in the United States, where he became an outstanding student. He took a job as a publicist, and later traveled in Europe while writing travel articles for Caretas. He described his travel in Europe as a "voyage of self-discovery".

== Caretas ==
In the mid-1950s, Zileri joined Caretas full-time after returning to Peru from Europe. By that time the dictator Manuel A. Odria had already briefly shut down the magazine for "offending" him. In 1962, Francisco Igartua left Caretas to start his own political magazine Oiga (Hey in English), which would also achieve wide popularity, and Zileri became a co-director of Caretas with his mother. The two provided in-depth news investigation and sharp opinions which increased the magazine's popularity, but also attracted the wrath of the Peruvian government. Between 1968 and 1979, the government shut down the magazine seven times, for almost two years in one occasion, and for five months in 1979. Zileri called Caretas "a symbol of resistance" against successive dictators and their censors, and was deported twice, to Portugal in 1969 and to Argentina in 1975. He was also sentenced to prison for three years for defaming government officials, before he was pardoned by an amnesty. Zileri gradually took over responsibilities from his mother, until Doris Gibson fully retired in the early 1990s.

During the authoritarian administration of Alberto Fujimori in the 1990s, Zileri took a principled stance against the government, at a time when Fujimori bribed many of Peru's television stations and newspapers. He exposed the past of the powerful spy chief Vladimiro Montesinos, and opposed Fujimori's attempt to extend his presidency for an unconstitutional third term. He was hit with a fine in 1992, and the magazine lost revenue due to government pressure on advertisers, but was vindicated when corruption scandals forced Fujimori from office in 2000. Fujimori was eventually convicted for human rights abuses.

== Awards ==
In 1975, Columbia University awarded Zileri the Maria Moors Cabot Award for "excellence in coverage of Latin America and the Caribbean". He later became a judge for the award. He also served as the president of the International Press Institute, an organisation dedicated to the promotion and protection of press freedom.

== Family ==
Zileri was married to Daphne Dougall, an Argentine of Scottish descent and a distinguished photographer, for 51 years. They had five children: Marco, Domenica, Diana, Sebastian and Drusila. Enrique Zileri granted the leadership role at Caretas to his eldest son, Marco, in 2007 in a helathy effort to renew the leadership with the younger generation.

== Retirement and death ==
From 2007 onwards, Enrique Zileri ceded more leadership roles until his passing from complications of throat cancer on 24 August 2014. His death was announced by Prime Minister Ana Jara.
