= Daphne Zileri =

Argentine-born Peruvian photographer

- Born: Daphne Dougall Hogg; 19 April 1936; Buenos Aires, Argentina
- Died: 21 October 2011 (aged 75); Lima, Peru
- Other names: Daphne Dougall, Daphne Dougall Zileri, Daphne Dougall Hogg de Zileri
- Occupation: Photographer
- Years active: 1968–2011
- Known for: Street photographs of children

Daphne Dougall de Zileri (19 April 1936 – 21 October 2011) was an Argentine-born Peruvian photographer. She is most known for her iconic images of children in typical street scenes throughout Lima. The first female photographer for Caretas magazine, she published two collected volumes of works which examined solitude and intimacy. Posthumously, collections of her photography have toured in Colombia, the United States and Peru.

== Early life ==
Daphne Dougall Hogg was born on 19 April 1936 in the El Tigre neighborhood of Buenos Aires, Argentina, to parents who had immigrated from Scotland at the turn of the twentieth century. Her father, was Alfred B. Dougall, founder of the Argentine radio station Radio Excélsior. (Note: Her family history and the history of the radio industry in Argentina is included in a book, El último broadcaster: la saga de un anglo-criollo en la Argentina (1887–1977), written by one of Dougall's grandchildren) Her early years were spent in Argentina, where she received a boarding-school education. At twenty-two, she left Buenos Aires and moved to New York City, where she started work in an advertising agency. The agency's biggest client was located in Cuba and when the Cuban Revolution made doing business impossible, Dougall became a flight attendant.

In 1959, she met Enrique Zileri through friends who were also flight attendants, during a stop-over in Lima, Peru. After a brief courtship, they married within a year and then had five children: Marco, Doménica, Diana, Sebastián and Drusila. While she was raising her children, Dougall took photographs of her children and studied master photographers such as Ansel Adams, Henri Cartier-Bresson, Robert Frank and Dorothea Lange to develop her skill.

== Career ==
Zileri began working as the first female photographer at Caretas, the political magazine owned by her husband's family. In 1968, when the military government of Juan Velasco Alvarado took control of the country, Enrique was exiled to Spain and Zileri took what jobs she could find to support the family. She worked as a substitute teacher and a translator, taking bridal photographs on the side. She also assisted in multiple functions to keep the magazine running during other upheavals, when they were forced to shut down or were exiled due to their pro-Democracy stance. She strongly influenced the artistic vision of the magazine.

In 1994, Zileri held an exhibit of her works at Centro Cultural General San Martín in Buenos Aires. Though she tried many times to sell her work, she found no market for her photographs. Instead, she published two books, Soliloquios (1996) and Dúos (2000), as companion pieces—one exploring solitude and the other intimate relationships. The images collected in Soliloquios were taken in Buenos Aires, SoHo, Manhattan, and in Cairo, Egypt. Her photographs, often of children, depict a "unique sensitivity" to the human condition and the majority reflected the color and reality of the streets of Lima. Near the end of her career, she concentrated on portraiture. She preferred to use a Leica camera without zoom or flash, but in her later photography, she sometimes used a digital camera, though she felt the process was not as artistic.

Zileri died on 21 October 2011 in Santiago de Surco, Lima, from complications of asthma. Posthumously, exhibits of her work were held in Colombia (2011), at the Fernando de Szyszlo Art Gallery at the Peruvian Embassy in Washington, D.C. (2011), the Art Gallery of New York City's Cervantes Institute (2011), and in Lima's Miraflores District (2012).

== Selected works ==
- Zileri, Daphne (1996). Soliloquios (in Spanish). Arequipa, Perú: Ausonía. OCLC 51642509.
- Zileri, Daphne (2000). Dúos (in Spanish). Arequipa, Perú: Ausonía. OCLC 905220237.
