= Oiga =

Oiga may refer to:

- Oiga (magazine)
- Oiga, Ngari Prefecture, western Tibet
- Oiga, Nyingchi Prefecture, south eastern Tibet
