= Olímpico (disambiguation) =

Olímpico or Olímpica (Portuguese and Spanish for Olympic), may refer to:

- Albergue Olímpico, a training center located in Puerto Rico
- Associação Olímpica de Itabaiana, a Brazilian football (soccer) club
- Atlético Deportivo Olímpico, a Peruvian football (soccer) club
- Olímpico (born 1965), Mexican Luchador
- Olímpico Clube, a Brazilian football (soccer) club
- C.D. Olímpico Litoral, a Salvadoran football (soccer) club
- Club Olímpico de Totana, a Spanish football (soccer) club
- Ciclista Olímpico, an Argentine sports club
- Pequeño Olímpico (born 1971), Mexican Luchador
- Grêmio Esportivo Olímpico, a Brazilian football (soccer) club
- Olímpico Esporte Clube, a Brazilian football (soccer) club
- Olímpico Pirambu Futebol Clube, a Brazilian football (soccer) club
- Olímpico Peruano, a Peruvian football (soccer) club
- Prêmio Brasil Olímpico, a Brazilian sports award
- Olímpica metro station, station located in the State of Mexico
- Organización Radial Olímpica, a Colombian radio network

== See also ==
- Estadio Olímpico (disambiguation)
- Olympico goal, an association football goal scored directly from a corner kick
