= Magaly Medina =

Peruvian entrepreneur (born 1963)

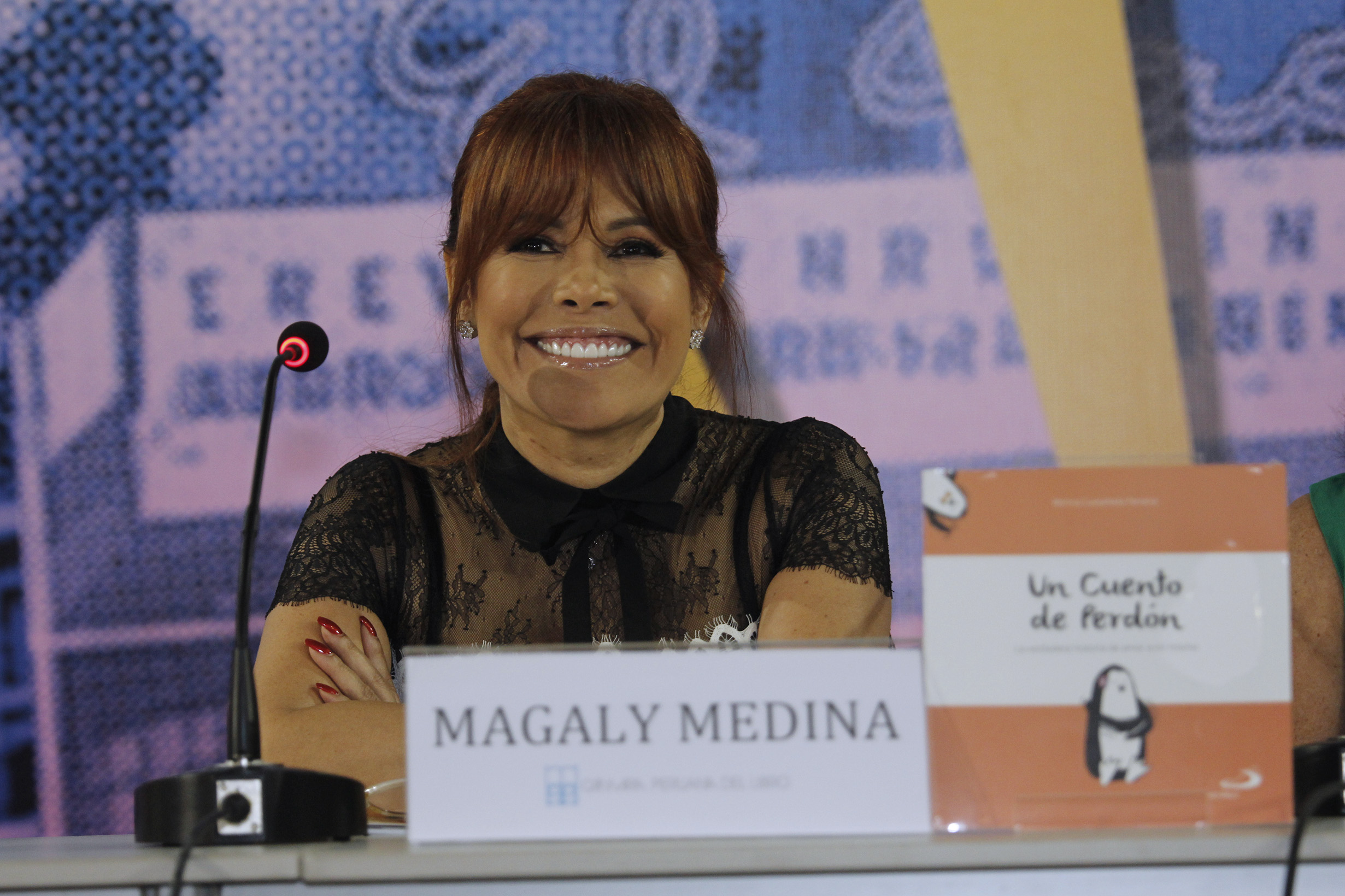
- Medina in 2017
- Born: Magaly Jesús Medina Vela; 31 March 1963 (age 63); Huacho, Huaura, Lima Peru
- Other name: "La Urraca" "La Bocona"
- Occupations: Hostess, journalist, influencer
- Spouses: César Lengua (divorced) Marco Mendoza (divorced): Alfredo Zambrano
- Children: Gianmarco Mendoza Medina

Magaly Jesús Medina Vela (born March 31, 1963) is a Peruvian entrepreneur, presenter, radio and television producer, most known for hosting the popular celebrity gossip show Magaly TV, la firme since 1997. In it, she talks about the lives and scandals of Peruvian celebrities from "Chollywood," a portmanteau of the words "Cholo" and "Hollywood" that she coined.

In December 2016, it was announced that Medina would return to her journalistic roots by hosting "90 Matinal," the morning news segment on Latina, starting March 2017.

== History ==
While being a journalist in the political weekly magazine Oiga, under the supervision of journalist Francisco "Paco" Igartua, for more than six years, she made her television debut in April 1991 on the journalistic debate show "Fuego Cruzado" in which, alongside other journalists and linguist Martha Hildebrandt, member of the Peruvian Academy of Language, harshly questioned and criticized well-known and now deceased television presenter Augusto Ferrando, whom they described as vulgar for his style as a host on his former TV show, "Trampolín a la Fama".

She moved on from local political reporting and crime news to show business in a small segment on "El Noticiero," the news program on ATV. The segment, called "Pese a Quien le Pese," which was the launch platform for what would become what Medina is known for; a celebrity gossip show known as Magaly TeVe that would influence the way celebrity news are consumed in the country. The show made its debut on November 1, 1997, on ATV. During its most popular period, Magaly TeVe managed 30 points in ratings, hitting a high in January 2009 after returning from her 76 days in prison with an average of 39.1, and peaks of 56.4 and 44.5 in the A/B and C sectors, respectively. Her program there was particularly popular in Colombia among Perubólica users.

Her show moved to Frecuencia Latina (now known as Latina) in the early years of 1998 to 2000, but move back to ATV in 2001 where it spanned into a printed magazine Revista Magaly TeVe, and stayed on the air until December 21, 2012.

After taking a two-year break, when she even participated as a guest jury on an episode of "Peru's Next Top Model," Medina returned to television with the simply titled "Magaly," making its debut on September 13, 2014 on Latina. A year later, she also produced "En Carne Propia, Anorexia y Bulimia" a special program on Latina that talked about these diseases through testimonies and research.

In December 2016, it was announced that Medina would return to her journalistic roots by hosting "90 Matinal," the morning news segment on Latina, starting March 2017.

== Magaly TV, la Firme Glossary ==
=== Chollywood ===
The portmanteau of the words "Cholo" and "Hollywood," a term that is widely used in Peru to describe its local show business of actors, musicians, comedians, TV presenters, soccer players and, now, reality TV stars. (Not to be confused with the portmanteau of "China" and "Hollywood" used by some journalists covering Chinese film productions).

=== La Urraca ===
"The magpie" was the symbol of Magaly Medina's program since its inception.

=== Ampay ===
This is a controversial word of Quechua origin, used to determine situations in which someone is found doing something hidden. It is also a word commonly used while Peruvian children play Hide & Seek, in which the seeker yells "Ampay!" alongside the name of the person that they have found.

The success of the space of Medina is due to the famous "ampays," which was usually paparazzi footage, shot by her team of "chacales", of celebrities cheating on their significant others [also nicknamed "jugadores" (players)] or sportsmen drinking on the streets.

=== Chacales ===
"Jackals" were the team of celebrity journalists or paparazzi videographers who worked under Medina, creating the segments of her show.

=== Figuretti ===
The term used for the celebrity that would show up on numerous news, seeking attention from the cameras, for reasons unknown.

=== Jugador or Jugadorazo ===
The term used for men, especially soccer players, that were linked romantically to several women. Used as the term "Lady's Man" or "Player."

=== Bataclana ===
The word "bataclana" appears in Latin America with the arrival of the Parisian theater company, Bataclan, in Buenos Aires in 1922. During the shows, showgirls with little clothing who lived their lives loosely would be called "bataclanas," pejoratively.

Medina popularized the term in Peruvian pop culture to refer to local showgirls, known as "vedettes." However, the term "vedette" in Latin America is used differently to France, where it's used to refer to actresses.

=== Calabacita ===
The term is taken from the Latino dubbing of "Married with Children," in which fictional character Al Bundy (played by Ed O'Neill) called his daughter, Kelly (played by Christina Applegate), pumpkin. "Calabacita" is almost a direct translation of the word "pumpkin," but with the added "little pumpkin," used to refer to pretty women with a lack of brains, a common description of Kelly Bundy.
