= Kalimán =

- Kaliman, el Hombre Increíble promotional art by Jose Luis Gutierrez.

Publication information
- Publisher: Promotora K (Mexico); Editora Cinco (Colombia)
- First appearance: "Los Profanadores de Tumbas (The Tomb Raiders)", 1963
- Created by: Rafael Cutberto Navarro Huerta; Modesto Vázquez González

In-story information
- Alter ego: No dual identity
- Abilities: Martial arts Esoteric and scientific knowledge Fast healing Telepathy; Actus mortis Almost superhuman strength Limited shapeshifting

Kalimán or Kalimán, the Incredible Man is a popular Mexican adventurer superhero, created by Rafael Cutberto Navarro and Modesto Vázquez González in 1963. He is the main character of the radio drama bearing his name, which depicts the adventures of Kalimán, a descendant of the Egyptian Pharaohs, and his young companion, Solín. Kalimán is very well known and popular across Spanish America, and the radio series spawned a comic book series and two film adaptations. The adventures of Kalimán were published as a serialized weekly comic, and printed for twenty-six consecutive years, with the series reaching its highest popularity in 1965; it is still quite popular today in reprints and in paperback format. Kalimán himself is considered as a Mexican pop culture icon and one of the first and most representative examples of Mexican superheroes.

== Origin and powers ==
Kalimán's true origin is unknown, and never revealed in any media, which adds to the sense of mystery that surrounds his character. He is supposedly an Indian orphan, who was found abandoned in a river and adopted by Prince Abul Pasha, who hails from one of the kingdoms in the Valley of Kalimantan. He is the fifth in a dynasty of men dedicated to preserving justice in the world, and the seventh man of the goddess Kali's dynasty. He swore an oath to Kali to wander the world fighting for justice, and must return to India in order to renew the oath every seven years. However, Kalimán not only has Caucasian features, but also intense blue eyes, one of his most notorious characteristics, which only adds more mystery to his true identity. It is also frequently mentioned that he has a vast knowledge of science and the arts, including the fine arts, engineering, architecture, chemistry, and biology.

Kalimán wears an all-white outfit (except for the reverse of his cloak, which is dark red), with just one mark: a jeweled-encased "K" in front of his turban. Being a master of all martial arts, he does not use any kind of weapons, except a blow-gun with tranquilizer darts, and a ceremonial dagger that complements his costume. He also possesses extraordinary mental powers: levitation, telepathy, remote viewing, telekinesis, astral projection, control of the involuntary functions of the body (which allows him to feign being dead), hypnosis, ESP, and self-healing, among others. He makes clear that he does nothing that any other men would not be able to do through self-discipline, study, and hard work. It is assumed that his apprentice, Solín, a common boy, will eventually take his place as he learns from him.

Kalimán's dramas were a combination of Sherlock Holmes, Tintin, and James Bond-style adventures, with him acting as a skilled detective, and using his incredible mental abilities to solve the ongoing mysteries; however, he also fights spirits, monsters, supervillain organizations, and supernatural threats with magic and martial arts. Kalimán himself refused to use any kind of gun, continuously insisting that firearms in general were the last resource of the weak, although he eventually used arrows, swords, or daggers to disarm his enemies.

If compared with modern-day superheroes, Kalimán could be described as a combination of Marvel Comics' Doctor Strange and Iron Fist.

== Main characters ==
Heroes

Kalimán, the Incredible Man: Initially, it is stated that Kalimán is just Solín's protector and tutor, but as the series progresses, Kalimán gradually replaces Solín as the main character. Kalimán had several popular catchphrases often used to explain his actions, but the two most relevant were "Serenity and Patience", often told to his disciple, Solín, to prevent him from rushing to action without thinking; and "Whoever dominates the mind, dominates the world", frequently used after he succeeded in realizing an impossible feat.

Solín: An eleven-year-old boy, rescued from the streets of Cairo in Kalimán's first adventure. It is initially stated that he is "incredibly valuable" to restoring the Pharaoh's just and fair rule to Egypt. However, he needs to be trained both physically and mentally prior to reconstructing his kingdom, in order to become a great ruler, hence the reason why Kalimán was sent to locate and protect him until the day he is ready to fulfill his destiny.

Villains

Every adventure had its respective villains, who usually only appeared in that specific story and never came back, being killed, imprisoned, defeated, or vanished at the end; however, three of them made a notorious difference in Kalimán's universe: Black Spider, Karma, and Namilak. Count Bartok, as well as battling Kaliman, also served as the host in his own title, presenting one-off horror stories, akin to Cain and Abel in DC Comics or The Crypt-keeper in Tales from the Crypt.

Black Spider: He was the most notorious exception, since he is the only one who came back regularly, both in the comic and the radio drama. He returned so frequently that, at some point, he was present in two different stories published at the same time. He is a super spy, like an evil James Bond, full of gadgets and mischievous plans. He is extremely skilled, able to escape from the most desperate situations, and possessing an enormous talent to avoid being incarcerated.

Karma: Originally, he was Kalimán's rival for the Red Dragon title, which is granted by Tibetan monks to the most perfect incarnation of a man of peace on Earth, who will become the official Protector of the World. It is stated that Karma is almost equal to Kalimán in every aspect and sense, but fails due to a minor flaw in his soul. Angered after being rejected for such an insignificant detail, Karma decides to embrace that flaw and falls into darkness, becoming Kalimán's nemesis. The character was so popular that he was the only one who died and resurrected in three different occasions (all other characters that died in the series remained dead), and is considered Kalimán's most fearsome foe.

Namilak: He is initially presented as "the reverse Kalimán", an enemy so similar to him that they even have the same costume, face, voice, and attitude, but everything Namilak does is wrong, negative, and impure. He is the exact opposite of the Incredible Man (even his name is Kalimán spelled backwards), and is always dressed in a black version of the hero's costume. It is later revealed that he is the respective negative flaw of Kalimán's soul. However, instead of falling to it, like Karma did at Red Dragon's trial, he expelled it from his body a long time ago. Unfortunately, as a result of this decision, the evil in his soul embodied and become a full, living being, as a twisted, maniacal version of his host. Namilak's existence also explains why Kalimán is so perfect, since there's no evil or malice left in his body. Namilak's story arc is a representation of Kalimán fighting his own obscure, repressed desires.

== Radio play ==
The Kalimán radio series started in 1963. It was transmitted by Radio Cadena Nacional (1110 AM in Mexico City, currently known as Radio Red), a radio station dedicated to broadcast radio dramas, soap operas in the mornings, and adventure plays at afternoon. The show was an immediate hit, and soon was broadcast throughout the Mexican Republic. Due to its success, the radio play was redone in Colombia, broadcast by Todelar with Colombian actors.

In addition to being a co-creator of Kaliman, Navarro was also the founder of its flagship network, Radio Cadena Nacional.

To spice up the mystery of Kalimán's true identity, the voice of the Mexican version of the radio play was done by actor Luis Manuel Pelayo, but the credit always went to "Kalimán himself", avoiding any mention of an actor behind the radio character. At some point, many fans truly believed he was a real person, now retired, who was narrating his personal experiences with the assistance of the radio station. In Colombia, Kalimán was played by Gaspar Ospina. The radio drama has been continuously on air several times along the years in different regions of Mexico and Spanish America.

In October 2015, as part of the celebration of the fiftieth anniversary of the first published comic book, the last recorded adventure "The Nefertti Necklace", never aired before on radio, began airing in MVS 102.5 FM in Mexico City, with a mix of modern production from the original recording (which presents more modern technology than the first adventures, recorded over twenty years earlier), along with the most modern radio production technology of the time (2015).

Main players

Kalimán, the Incredible Man: Luis Manuel Pelayo

Solín: Luis de Alba

Narrator: Isidro Olace

Director: Marcos Ortiz

Scripts by Víctor Fox (Héctor Gonzalez pseudonym)

== List of Kalimán's radio drama episodes ==
1. "The Tomb Raiders"
2. "The Mystery of the Astronauts"
3. "The Tiger of Hong-Kong"
4. "The Mysteries of Bonampak"
5. "The Valley of the Vampires"
6. "The Mummies of Machu Pichu"
7. "The Queen of the Gorillas"
8. "The Strange Doctor Death"
9. "Atlantis, the Lost City"
10. "The Diabolical Warlocks"
11. "The Black Spider"
12. "The Living Corpses"
13. "The Invisible Terror"
14. "The Black Panthers of Istanbul"
15. "The Red Mask Assassins"
16. "The Genius from beyond the Grave"
17. "The Game of Death"
18. "Werewolves" (literal translation: "The Human Wolves")
19. "The Sons of the Sun"
20. "The Idols Vengeance"
21. "The White Witch of Kilimanjaro"
22. "Sons of Satan"
23. "The Space Pirates"
24. "Samurais, Messengers of Death"
25. "Terror from the Grey Planet"
26. "Beyond the Beyond"
27. "The Castle of the Monsters"
28. "Invasion of the Satanic Worshipers"
29. "The Octopus with the Golden Tentacles"
30. "Death in the Fourth Dimension"
31. "Magicians of Crime"
32. "The Terrible Miklos"
33. "The Demon of Tibet"
34. "The Sinister World of Humanon"
35. "Malevolent Power"

== Comic book adaptation ==
Two years after his radio debut, Kalimán's popularity grew so much that the decision was made for Promotora K to publish his adventures in comic book format. In order to preserve the same aura of mystery as presented by the original radio play, the comic strictly stuck to its established story; it never mentioned any details about Kalimán not previously mentioned in the radio drama, nor added additional information about the main character. The first issue of Kalimán, written by Clemente Uribe Ugarte, was published on December 4, 1965, with the first to tenth parts of the story "Los Profanadores de Tumbas" ("The Tomb Raiders"). 100,000 copies were sold within that week, and due to excessive demand, the issue had to be reprinted. The original series ran until 1991, with a total of 1,348 weekly issues.

The comic book was printed in sepia tones, with an artistic watercolor effect on every page, like most of the Mexican comics of that time, instead of the CMYK printing technique used in American comics. Only the cover, painted with acrylics, was done in full color. Later, the special editions "Kalicolor" and "Kalimán de Lujo" were done in full color, using the same printing process as in America, but they were less popular than the original magazine and never sold well. The reprints give the scriptwriting credits to Víctor Fox, who had purchased the rights to the comic, instead of the comics' original writer, Clemente Uribe.

The Kalimán comic book was published in Colombia as well, starting with the eleventh issue of the Mexican run, the beginning of the second story, "The Valley of the Vampires". The Colombian run of the comic book lasted for more than 1,206 issues. From Colombia, the comic was also exported to most South American countries, contributing to the expansion of Kalimán's popularity across Latin America.

In 2010, the Ecuadorian daily newspaper El Comercio (Quito, Ecuador) acquired the rights to reprint "Mysteries of Bonampak" and "The Triangle of Death" as a serialized comic strip.

== List of Kalimán's comic book adventures ==
Most of Kalimán's first adventures in comic book format were adaptations of the original radio drama scripts; some even had the same titles, but eventually developed their own independent stories. After issue 1308, the comic began to reprint the complete series in the same order as they were originally published. In the late 1970s, the complete stories were also published as paperbacks in a large-volume format. The first issues were also reprinted, like most American comics, with new art and in full color as an independent comic, "Kalicolor". The public did not accept the colored versions very well, so their print run was very short-lived. Even now, the original sepia comics are reprinted from time to time, either as serialized comics or collected editions.

1. "The Tomb Raiders", issues 1-10; main villain: Eric von Kraufen
2. "The Valley of the Vampires", issues 11-32; main villain: Count Bártok
3. "Mysteries of Bonampak", issues 33-47; main villain: Captain Scott
4. "The Mystery of the Astronauts", issues 47-64; main villain: Van Zeland
5. "The Tiger of Hong-Kong", issues 64-77; main villain: The Tiger of Hong-Kong
6. "The Mummies of Machu-Pichu", issues 77-90; main villain: Comahué
7. "The Unburied One", issues 90-103; main villain: Sacha Moster (first original story created exclusively for the comic)
8. "The Strange Doctor Death", issues 103-124; main villain: Doctor Death
9. "The Black Hand", issues 124-150; main villain: Black Spider
10. "Samurais, Messengers of Death", issues 147-180; main villain: Doctor Kiro
11. "Magicians of Crime", issues 175-212; main villain: Professor Satanyk
12. "The White Terror", issues 201-244; main villain: The Brain
13. "Messengers of Death", issues 231-259; main villain: The Octopus
14. "Puppets of Hell", issues 256-287; main villain: Bengala
15. "Return of the Black Spider", issues 280-315; main villain: Black Spider
16. "The Fantastic Journey", issues 310-351; main villain: Poseidon
17. "Brains of Hell", issues 344-387; main villain: Humanon
18. "Horsemen of Terror", issues 378-416; main villain: Zulma
19. "Mysteries of the Chinese Wall", issues 411-452; main villain: The Black Knight
20. "The Invisible Assassin", issues 447-485; main villain: Baron Kruger
21. "The Sacred Pharaoh", issues 478-522; main villain: Nefris
22. "The Red Dragon", issues 513-572; main villain: Karma
23. "The White Witch of Kilimanjaro"; issues 563-633, main villain: Tac-Tac
24. "The Triangle of Death", issues 622-698; main villain: Black Spider
25. "Eye of Satan", issues 685-752; main villain: Kardo
26. "The Revenge of Karma", issues 742-817; main villain: Karma
27. "The Shadow of Terror", issues 806-887; main villain: Count Bartok
28. "The Seventh Death", issues 880-944; main villain: Namilak
29. "Black Magic", issues 935-989; main villain: Black Spider
30. "Panthers of Istanbul", issues 978-1018; main villain: Prince Sakiri
31. "Black Buddha", issues 1009–1070; main villain: Ramar
32. "Masks of Death", issues 1061–1101; main villain: Lukas Hunt
33. "The Chinese Terror", issues 1092–1153; main villain: Lin-Poo
34. "City of the Dead", issues 1144–1194; main villain: Doctor Hill
35. "Terror Underground", issues 1186–1236; main villain: Isis
36. "The Red Warriors", issues 1227–1273; main villain: Katana
37. "The Man Who Fell from the Moon", issues 1264–1308; main villain: Cosman

== Legal issues ==
The comic was so popular that it was one of the few Mexican comics consistently sold in the United States, mostly in areas with a large Latin American population. Since the character The Incredible Hulk used the subtitle "El Hombre Increible" for Latin American editions and was first published in 1962, Marvel Comics sued Promotora K for using "El Hombre Increible" in Kalimán's comic title. After several months, the court ruled in favor of Promotora K with the reasoning that Marvel did not use the subtitle "El Hombre Increible" until 1968, years after Kalimán was sold in the United States. As a result of this ruling, Marvel Comics had to pay royalties to Promotora K to legally use "El Hombre Increible" in the Hulk's titles. After the decision was made, Promotora K made several Kalimán covers featuring parodies of popular Fantastic Four characters threatening Kalimán.

== Film adaptations ==
Due to the popularity of the character, two movies were produced in Mexico, with Canadian actor Jeff Cooper as Kalimán. His voice was dubbed by Luis Manuel Pelayo, the voice actor who played the role of Kalimán in the radio play, to make it match with the sound that was so familiar to the radio audience.

The first movie, Kalimán, el Hombre Increíble (Kalimán, the Incredible Man) (1972), was filmed entirely on location in Egypt. It had an international cast, from the US, México, Spain, Italy, and Egypt. The movie is loosely based on the first story, "Los Profanadores de Tumbas" ("The Tomb Raiders"), but added a science fiction theme. For almost 20 years, it held the title of the most expensive Mexican movie ever filmed. It was a huge success, being shown in theaters for more than a year. The original running time was up to 180 minutes, but was cut down to 109 for later TV release.

The second film was Kalimán en el Siniestro Mundo de Humanón (Kalimán in the Sinister World of Humanón) (1976), based on the adventures from radio and comic of the same name; it was filmed on location in Brazil and México. It was less successful than the first film, and for some time, there were no plans for other movies based on the character.

As of 2011, there have been plans for a third movie, with the working title of Kalimán Regresa (Kalimán Returns), but they have been on hold, due to copyright issues. In 2015, it was finally announced that José Ángel Medina was the legal owner of all the character copyrights. Medina also stated he was negotiating with Marvel Comics for a deal to reprint the comics, but also included an option to produce a movie.

== Novel adaptation ==
In 2016, to commemorate the first fifty years of Kalimán, the first radio drama script, "Los Profanadores de Tumbas" ("The Tomb Raiders"), was rewritten and adapted to a novel format. The book also includes new illustrations specifically made for it by René del Valle, one of the artists who collaborated with the comic in its final years of publication.
