= Francisco Igartua =

Basque-Peruvian journalist and author (1923–2004)

Francisco Igartua Rovira
- Born: September 5, 1923; Huarochirí, Lima, Peru
- Died: March 24, 2004 (aged 80); Lima, Peru
- Occupations: Journalist, author

Francisco Igartua Rovira, better known as Paco Igartua (September 5, 1923 – March 24, 2004) was a Basque-Peruvian journalist and the founder and director of Oiga magazine in 1948 and, with Doris Gibson, of Caretas magazine in 1950.

== Life ==
Born in the Huarochirí district outside Lima to Francisco Igartua and Herminia Rovira, he went to school in Callao, and studied at the Franciscan seminary in Santiago de Chile for a year. He then went to study law at the Pontificia Universidad Católica del Perú, but dropped out to become a journalist in 1943.

=== Early years as a journalist ===
He worked as a journalist for Jornada and La Prensa from 1943 to 1950. Because of his criticisms of the government at the time, he was jailed for the first time in 1944. In 1950, he founded the weekly Oiga!, which only lasted for a few weeks, as he was jailed and the publication closed due to his criticisms of the General Manuel A. Odría dictatorship.

=== Exile and return ===
In 1950, alongside Doris Gibson, he founded the magazine Caretas, which he directed from October 3, 1950, to October 22, 1962. The magazine is still relevant today. In 1952, the Odría dictatorship exiled him to Panama, but he made a surprise return to Lima, and took refuge at the former home of El Comercio, where, after lengthy conversations, he managed to get his expulsion overturned. Even today, this is the first known case of a persecuted journalist seeking "asylum" at a periodical's address. This honor was recalled by Igartua himself in his first autobiography, Huellas de un destierro. Afterwards, he wrote for the periodicals El Comercio, Correo, and finally at Expreso.

On November 28, 1962, Igartua re-founded Oiga with the same name it has kept until now (without the exclamation mark; now known as its "second phase"), which would go on to become the leading political weekly in Peru. During this time, Igartua supported the presidential candidacy of Fernando Belaúnde Terry, though later he would distance himself, and continue his scrutinizing work.

In 1965, Igartua changed the magazine's format to match that of Time magazine, starting off its third era, when it would criticize the leadership of Fernando Belaúnde at Acción Popular, including a daring defense of national interests in the Expropriation of La Brea y Pariñas affair (1966-1968). When Belaúnde was deposed and General Juan Velasco Alvarado came to power, Oiga supported the reform process, with the exception of calling for elections for a Constitutional Assembly, and for the defense of the freedom of the press. Igartua's protest before the state seizure of newspapers and the regimentation of the non-daily press brought with it his exile to Mexico in 1974, where he remained until 1977. During this time, he was the director for the Sunday supplement for Cadena Sol.

Upon his return to Peru, he started Oiga magazine's fourth era in 1978, switching to a tabloid format, and updating the masthead to read Oiga 78. With the start of the second Belaúnde government in 1980, Oiga entered its fifth stage by transforming into a weekly analytical journal with a wider coverage, again in the Time magazine format, including familiar and amenable topics, and maintaining a coherent and, in the words of the director "quixotic," democratic position.

=== Final years of Oiga ===
Oiga was published regularly during the Belaúnde and Alan García governments, as well as the first five years of the Alberto Fujimori government, until the latter's political and economic pressure closed the magazine. Its last issue appeared on September 5, 1995, issue number 756, titled "Adiós con la satisfacción de no haber claudicado" (Farewell with the satisfaction of not having given in).

On November 16, 1995, he transferred the rights to the Oiga name to the company Publicaciones de Revistas S.A. in order to pay off his tax debts and the pensions of his 70 workers.

Publicaciones de Revistas S.A was acquired by Eduardo Calmell del Solar, who was close to the Alberto Fujimori government, and he restarted publishing in the year 2000, supporting the Fujimori reelection campaign; it again closed in 2003. In 1998, at Igartua's behest, a work group was created with the intention of reviving Oiga, and this finally took place on February 14, 2008, when the brand was definitively registered with the National Institute for the Defense of Competition and Intellectual Property of Peru.

=== Later life and death ===
Between 1995 and 1999, he took part in the first two World Congresses of Basque Communities, at the invitation of the President of the Basque Government. He was in charge of writing up the final minutes of both congresses.

At the end of 2003, Igartua was diagnosed with lung cancer, and on March 24, 2004, he died in Lima.

Among the most important acts in the life of Francisco Igartua are also his participation with the Basque Community in Peru and as a personal guest at the World Congresses on Basque Communities, held in Bilbao.

Igartua received the Medal of Lima in 1998, the Grabriela Mistral Order of the government of Chile in 2001, and the Jerusalem Prize for journalism.

== Selected works ==
- Siempre un extraño (1995), memoirs
- Huellas de un destierro (1998), later memoirs
- Reflexiones entre molinos de viento (1997), a collection
- La Tina (2000), a collection of tales
- Andanzas de Federico More, compilation of the best articles by Federico More Barrionuevo, a teacher and friend to Igartua
- El género revisteril en el Perú, essay about the 20th-century history of Peru
- Unamuno y su camino, article commemorating the 50th anniversary of the death of Miguel de Unamuno
- José Luis Bustamante y Rivero, Patriarca de la Democracia, article commemorating the death of the former Constitutional President, wherein Igartua explains, among other details, the birth of Oiga magazine
