= CaribVision =

TV channel

- Type: Cable, satellite and television network
- Branding: CaribVision
- Country: Barbados
- Availability: America; Caribbean; Canada
- Owner: Caribbean Media Corporation (Public)
- Launch date: August 2006
- Affiliates: see list
- Official website: www.caribvision.tv

CaribVision is an international broadcast television channel that plays in the United States, the Caribbean and Canada. CaribVision is an internationally broadcast English-language television channel run by the Caribbean Media Corporation (CMC)'s national broadcast centre on the island of Barbados. The main focus of the channel is Caribbean culture, news, current affairs, sports, lifestyle, opinions, and entertainment from an Anglophone Caribbean perspective.

CaribVision is currently available in Latin America and over 30 Caribbean territories where it broadcasts to the Caribbean-diaspora. CaribVision appears in the United States and Canada. It is available in the United States on Cablevision.

Since 2022, its programs are available over-the-air in San Andrés and Providencia on Raizal TV, a channel created by Teleislas, one of its partners.

== Programming ==
- Caribbean News Review
- Caribbean Newsline
- Caribbean Today
- Riddim Express

== Partners and affiliates ==
- Caribbean Communications Network Ltd., (CCN-TV6) – Trinidad and Tobago
- Caribbean Broadcasting Corporation, (CBC-TV8) – Barbados
- Institute of Cuban Radio & Television, (ICRT) – Cuba
- ZNS Network – The Bahamas
- The Creative Production & Training Centre Ltd., (CPTC) – Jamaica
- Television Jamaica Ltd., (TVJ) – Jamaica
- CVM Television Ltd. – Jamaica
- Teleislas – Colombia

== See also ==
- List of television stations in the Caribbean
