= Oiga (magazine) =

Peruvian magazine

Oiga!
- Frequency: Weekly
- Founder: Francisco Igartua
- Founded: 1948
- First issue: November 8, 1948
- Final issue Number: September 5, 1995; 756
- Country: Peru

Oiga! (Spanish for "Hey!") was a Peruvian weekly magazine that ran from 1948 to 1995, founded by Basque-Peruvian journalist Francisco Igartua. It ran through different periods that were twice interrupted due to its opposition to the different Peruvian governments of the 20th century, with Igartua being either incarcerated or exiled a number of times. The first such event took place under the government of Manuel A. Odría in 1948, and continued with the government of Juan Velasco Alvarado.

Journalist Magaly Medina was a known collaborator for the magazine.

== See also ==
- Caretas
