= Doris Gibson =

Peruvian magazine writer and publisher

- Born: April 28, 1910; Lima, Peru
- Died: August 23, 2008 (aged 98)
- Resting place: Pachacámac Memorial Park Cemetery (Cementerio Parque del Recuerdo de Pachácamac)
- Occupations: Writer, editor, publisher and founder of Caretas
- Spouse: Manlio Zileri (m. 1929; died 1949)
- Children: Enrique Zileri
- Parents: Percy Gibson Moller (father); Mercedes Parra del Riego (mother)
- Awards: Gran Oficial de la Orden El Sol del Perú; Orden al Mérito de la Mujer (2022)

Doris Gibson Parra del Riego (Spanish pronunciation: [ˌd̪o.ɾis xiβ̞ˌsõm ˌpa.ra ð̞el ˈrje.ɣ̞o]; 28 April 1910 – 23 August 2008) was a Peruvian magazine writer and publisher. She is most noted as the founder and editor of the Peruvian weekly news magazine Caretas.

She has been described as "a feminist before the movement had begun, and according to many, a visionary who influenced the course of Peru's recent history through the brave and defiant reporting of the magazine she created".

== Life and work ==
Doris Gibson was born in Lima but spent her early years in Arequipa. Her father was the Peruvian poet of Scottish/German ancestry Percy Gibson Moller. In 1929, she married an Argentine diplomat, Manlio Zileri. They had one child, Enrique Zileri, who also became an editor of Caretas.

She had a relationship with the artist, Sérvulo Gutiérrez, for whom she was a muse as well as a lover. After Gibson and Gutiérrez had a heated argument, he rid himself of a full-size nude painting that he had executed of Gibson. He sold it to a well-off businessman. When she learned of the transaction, Gibson traveled to the businessman's house with a photographer and, on the pretext of needing daylight for a photograph, took the painting outside and promptly drove away with it. When the man later asked for its return, she responded, "I don't want to be nude in your house."

== Caretas ==
Gibson started the weekly news magazine Caretas in 1950, using 10,000 soles which her uncle had lent her, along with a room and a typewriter. The first issue appeared in October 1950, but before the end of the year her operation was shut down by then-dictator Manuel A. Odría (1948–1956). This pattern became familiar: the operation was closed five times by the government of Juan Velasco Alvarado (1975–1980) (in October 1969 Velasco ordered the arrest and deportation [to Spain] of then-editor Enrique Zileri Gibson). The operation was closed again under the regime of Francisco Morales Bermúdez (1975–1980).

The government of Fernando Belaúnde Terry (1980–1985) awarded the magazine the Orden del Sol del Perú, in recognition of its services. The government of Alejandro Toledo (2001–2006) also awarded the magazine the Grand Cross of the Orden al Mérito por Servicios Distinguidos.

Her grandson Marco Zilero Dougall was editor of the magazine when Doris Gibson Parra died in Lima.

== Later life and death ==
Gibson Parra entered a Peruvian clinic in August 2008 for treatment of pneumonia. She died there on 23 August 2008. She was predeceased by former husband Manlio Zileri. Peruvian President Alan García and several of his ministers attended her wake.
