= La Superestación =

Super Stereo
Colombia
- Broadcast area: Bogotá
- Frequency: Online
- Branding: La Superestación

Programming
- Format: Rock, pop, Latin pop
- Affiliations: Cadena Super

Ownership
- Owner: Cadena Super

History
- First air date: 19 March 1982; 1 September 2005 (online only)
- Former call signs: HJJO
- Former frequencies: 88.9 MHz (1982–2005)

Links
- Website: http://superestacion.fm

La Superestación (initially known as Super Stereo 88.9) is a Colombian pop-rock radio station, broadcasting from Bogotá since 19 March 1982, and owned by Cadena Super. In 2005, it became an online-only station, having leased its frequency (88.9 MHz FM) to RCN Radio's Radio Uno.

Before the inception of Super Stereo, the only rock-pop station in Bogotá was Stereo 95-1 (94.9 MHz, currently news/adult contemporary station La FM, owned by RCN Radio), though youth AM stations like Radio 15 and Radio Fantasía existed in the 1970s. Most of the programming of La Superestación consisted in rock and pop hits in English and Spanish.

Its flagship morning programme, El zoológico de la mañana, was inspired on the United States Morning Zoo format. It started in 1986. Other shows were its countdowns Los 20 superéxitos (weekly) and Los 11 superéxitos (daily). Super Stereo held the broadcasting rights of the American Top 40 (airing in English with the original talk by Casey Casem). La Superestación expanded to Medellín (92.9 MHz) and Cali (100.5 MHz).

The success of La Superestación inspired the creation of competing stations, such as Caracol Radio's Radioacktiva and Los 40 Principales, RTVC's Radionica, or RCN Radio's La Mega. After declining ratings in the 2000s, Cadena Super decided to lease La Superestación's frequencies to Radio Uno, at the time an AM vallenato station owned by RCN Radio, and turning it into an online radio station.

Its former callsign, HJJO, is now assigned to a small AM station in San Marcos, Sucre. Radio Uno's current callsign is HJHR.
