= La X (radio station) =

Colombian music radio brand

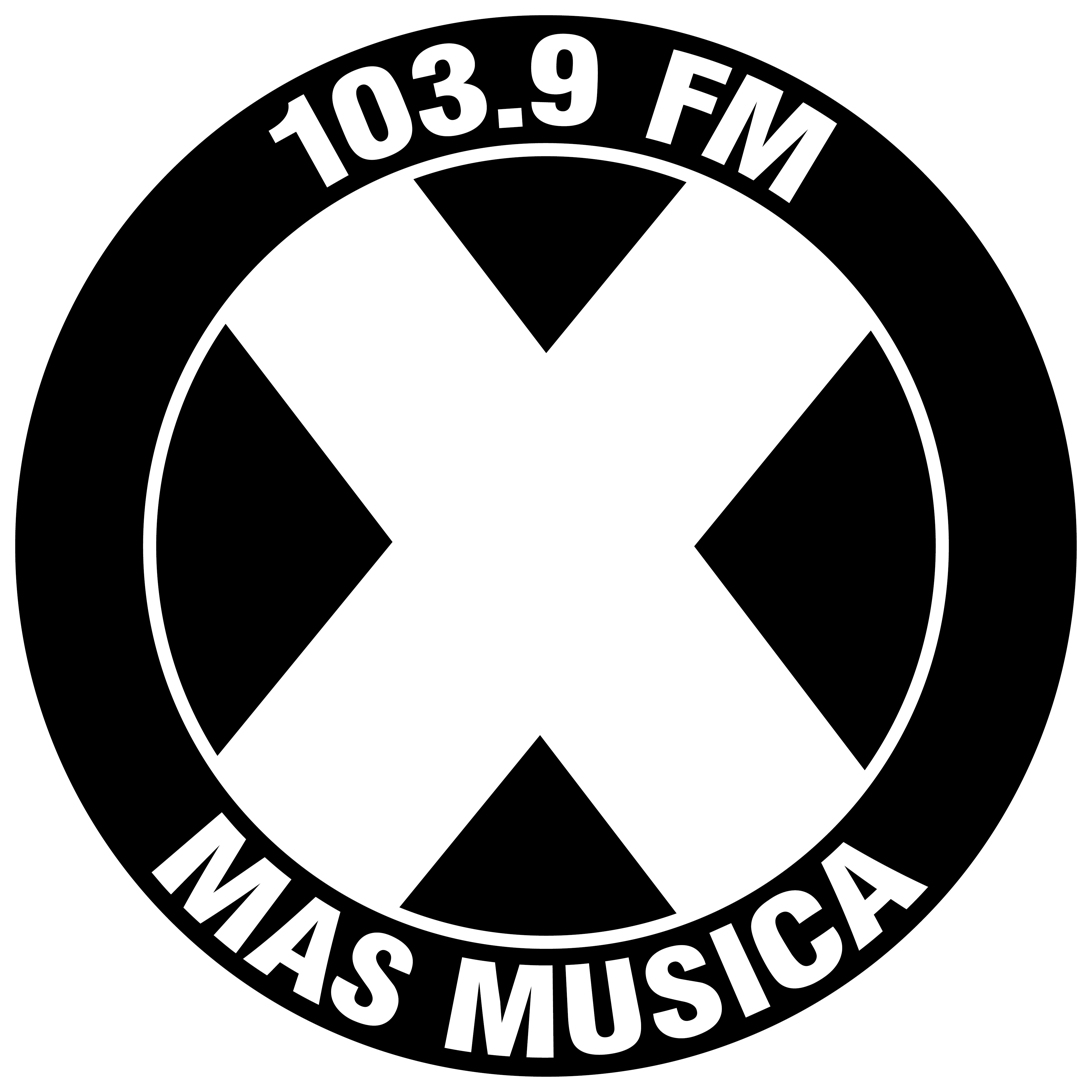
- Bogotá; Colombia
- Broadcast area: Bogotá
- Frequency: 103.9 MHz
- Branding: HJVU

Programming
- Format: Anglo - Pop - Top 40

Ownership
- Owner: Alianza Integral Com SAS

History
- First air date: 1982 (as Todelar Estéreo); 1994 (as La X)

Links
- Website: www.laxmasmusica.com

La X is a Colombian music radio brand for three stations operated and owned by Todelar.

The station in Bogotá airs an English-language adult contemporary format and the Cali station airs an English-language contemporary hit radio format, while the Medellín station airs an electronica format.

== Frequencies ==
- Bogotá: 103.9 MHz (HJVU)
- Medellín: 103.9 MHz (HJG54)
- Cali: 96.5 MHz (HJSQ)
