= Cadena Súper =

Radio Super (HJCI)
Bogotá; Colombia
- Frequency: 970 kHz

Programming
- Format: News / talk
- Affiliations: Cadena Super

Ownership
- Owner: Cadena Super

History
- First air date: 1971
- Last air date: 2012
- Former call signs: HJCJ
- Former frequencies: 1040 kHz (1971–1987)

Links
- Website: http://www.cadenasuper.com/

Cadena Super was a Colombian radio network, founded in the 1970s by Conservative politician Jaime Pava Navarro. Its flagship Bogotá station, Radio Super, which broadcast at 1040 kHz (formerly Radio Metropolitana), replaced pioneer station La Voz de la Víctor at 970 kHz in 1987. Before that, the flagship station was Villavicencio's La Voz del Llano.

Besides the main radio network, it owns La Superestación, a pop-rock station founded in 1982 and which became online-only in 2005, with its frequencies leased to rival network RCN Radio.

Since December 2012, all the Super's frequencies in AM (Bogotá, Medellín, Cali, Ibagué, Villavicencio -Voz del Llano-, Cúcuta and Neiva) were leased to RCN too. The 3 main frequencies are called Radio Red (Bogotá, Medellín and Cali), Radio Fiesta (Cúcuta), La Cariñosa (Voz del Llano in Villavicencio), and La FM (Ibagué and Neiva).
