= Organización Radial Olímpica =

- Founded: 1969
- Type: Private company
- Headquarters: Calle 72 Nº 48-37 in Barranquilla, Colombia.
- Products: Radio
- Employees: 394
- Website: http://www.oro.com.co

The Organización Radial Olímpica (ORO) is a Colombian radio station group owned by the wealthy and influential Char Abdalá family from Barranquilla.

== History ==
The organization began in 1969 with the acquisition of Radio Regalo AM in Barranquilla, which was later renamed Radio Olímpica AM in honor of the supermarket and pharmacy chain created by the Char family. Olímpica initially expanded on the Caribbean coast through AM stations before transitioning some of its stations to FM. In 1985, it established its first station in Bogotá.

Its main network is Olímpica Stereo, dedicated to tropical music (salsa, merengue, vallenato). Other networks include Radio Tiempo, La Reina, MIX, Play 103.7 FM, and La KY, the latter two located in Panama. The group also owns Emisora Atlántico, a Barranquilla-based station focused on news and sports.

== Media ==
Radio

- Colombia
  - Olímpica Stereo
  - Radio Tiempo
  - Radio Tiempo Clásica
  - Radio Tiempo Hit
  - Mix
  - La Reina
  - Emisora Atlántico
- Panama
  - Play
  - La KY
