= Telemedellín =

Television channel in Medellín, Colombia

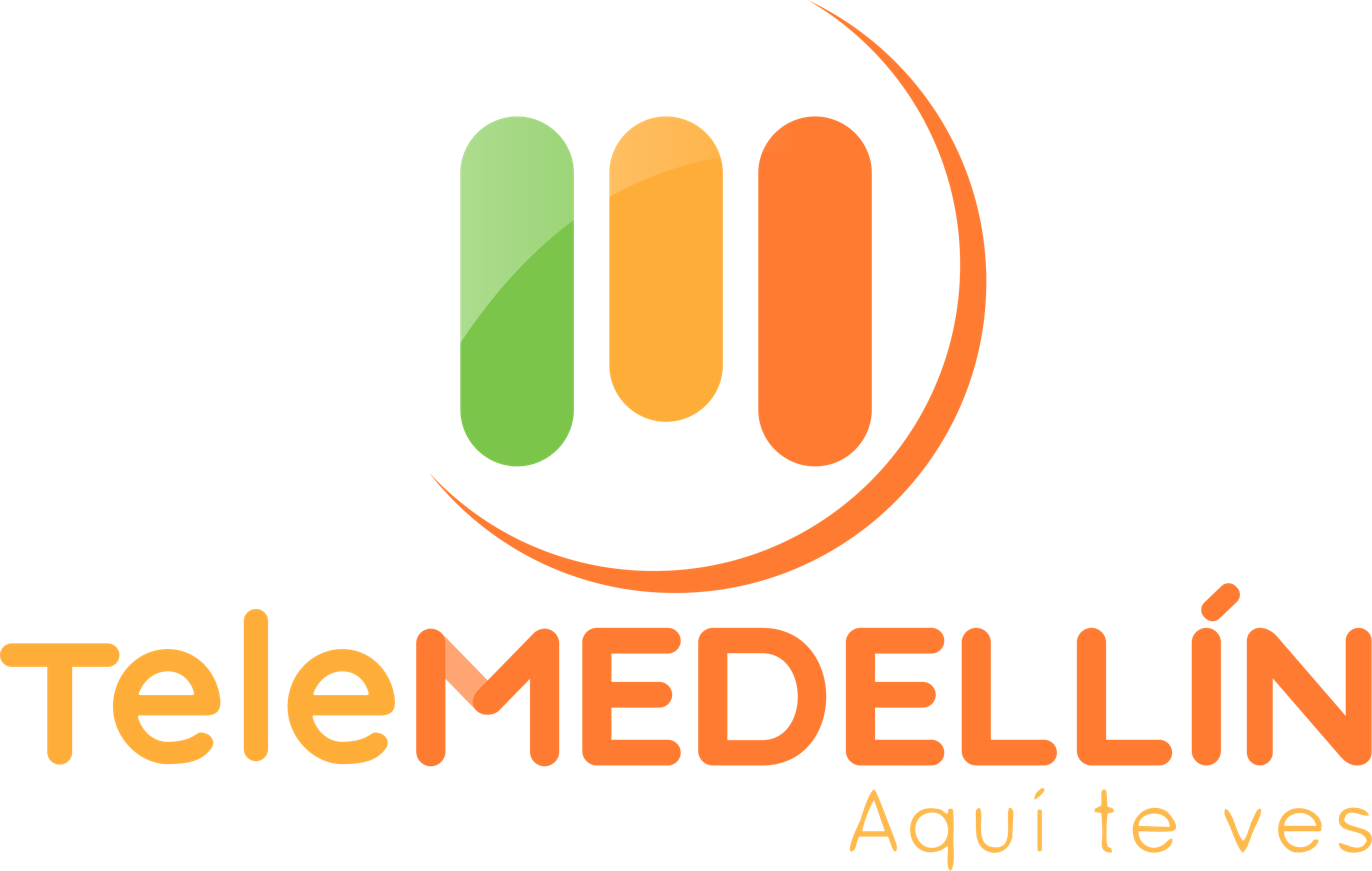
Official logo

Telemedellín is a Colombian local public television channel, which broadcasts for the metropolitan area of Valle de Aburrá and its headquarters are located in the city of Medellín. Telemedellin was officially launched on December 7, 1997, it stands out for being the first local television channel established in Colombia. Its programming is general.
