= Todelar =

System of radio stations in Colombia

Coordinates: 4.670735°N 74.059321°W

Todelar is a system of radio stations that covers all of Colombia, founded in 1953 by Jairo,Jaime and Bernardo Tobón de la Roche. Its flagship station is La Voz de Bogotá since 2017. Radio Continental, also in Bogotá, had this role until 2016, having joined Todelar (an acronym of the last names of its founder) in 1957.

As of 2015, the flagship morning news programme, Artunduaga por la mañana, was directed by journalist Édgar Artunduaga. The programme was cancelled December 2016, a few weeks before Radio Continental was sold to Cadena Radial Vida, a network owned by an evangelical group whose leader is Eduardo Cañas.

== History ==
Bernardo Tobón de la Roche was the manager of Radio Pacífico, a station in Cali affiliated to RCN Radio, and had founded La Voz de Pereira in the 1940s. After a congress of radio stations in 1956, Tobón de la Roche was able to secure affiliations for his network from stations of Bogotá, Medellín, Cali, Barranquilla, and Cartagena de Indias. By 1962 Todelar had 24 stations (11 owned-and-operated, 13 affiliates). In 1967 Unión Radio, a group of radio stations of Cali (Radio Uno, Radio el Sol), Pereira (La Voz Amiga, La Voz de Pereira), and Bogotá (La Voz de Bogotá, Emisora Monserrate), joined the network. De la Roche's brothers Jaime and Jairo, who also were part of the network, would leave and became executives of rival networks Caracol Radio and RCN Radio, respectively.

Todelar had its golden era in the 1960s and 1970s, broadcasting live sports events such as the Vuelta a Colombia, and the 1966 FIFA World Cup, or radioplays like La ley contra el hampa, a crime drama, or the Colombian version of the Mexican hit Kalimán.; some of these dramas were broadcast from Cali and lasted into the mid-1990s.

Todelar would later expand to FM. In 1977, Todelar had 344 stations.

After these years, Todelar has seen itself in disadvantage vis-à-vis rival networks RCN Radio and Caracol Radio, being in a slow decline since the 1990s; since Todelar is essentially a media company it has found difficult to compete in equal terms with those networks, owned by huge corporate conglomerates (Organización Ardila Lülle and PRISA, respectively). Some stations have left the network (including main flagship Radio Continental in 2017) and some timeslots, specially in the AM stations, are filled with paid programmes by shamans, naturist medicine laboratories and esoteric or religious groups since the late 1980s.

== Main networks ==
La Voz de Bogotá
- Colombia
- Broadcast area: Bogotá
- Frequency: 930 kHz
- Branding: HJCS

Programming
- Format: News / talk
- Affiliations: Todelar

Ownership
- Owner: Todelar

History
- First air date: 1953
- Former call signs: HJCE
- Former frequencies: 890 kHz (1940-mid 1990s)

Links
- Website: http://www.todelar.com/

- Circuito Todelar de Colombia: the main network, broadcasting news, sports, and events. Its flagship station is La Voz de Bogotá. Until 2017, the flagship station was Radio Continental.
- La Z: devoted to salsa music; its format is as 2015 preserved only by the Cali affiliate, HJBT. The Bogotá station (HJST) changed to a Latin pop format and the Medellín station (HJTO) broadcasts reggaeton.
- La 92 (HJST): devoted to pop (mainly in Spanish, with some English-language songs) and reggaeton; it simulcasts Édgar Artunduaga's morning news programme. It replaced Spanish-language pop and rock station El Sonido de la Ciudad (2013–2016), salsa music network La Z (1994–2013) and balada en español network Sonorama Estéreo (1982–1994).
- La X: youth programming— English-language rock and pop in Bogotá (HJVU), electronica in Medellín (HJG54), pop and electronica in Cali (HJSQ). Formerly known as Todelar Estéreo.

== Radio Stations ==
=== Bogotá ===
Name	Frequency	Code
La Voz de Bogotá	930 AM	HJCS
La X	103.9 FM	HJVU

=== Medellín ===
Name	Frequency	Code
La Voz del Río Grande	910 AM	HJDO
La Ochentera	91.9 FM	HJTO
La X	103.9 FM	HJG54

=== Cali ===
Name	Frequency	Code
La Voz de Cali	900 AM	HJEY
La X	96.5 FM	HJSQ
