= Caretas =

Peruvian magazine

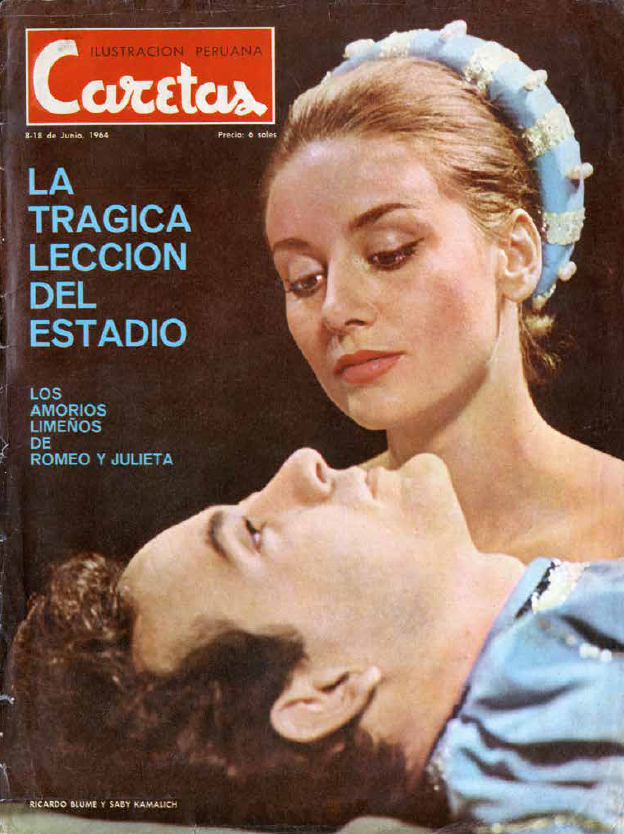
- June 1964 cover
- Categories: News magazine
- Frequency: Weekly
- Founder: Doris Gibson
- Founded: 1950
- Country: Peru
- Based in: Lima
- Language: Spanish
- Website: caretas.pe
- ISSN: 0576-7423

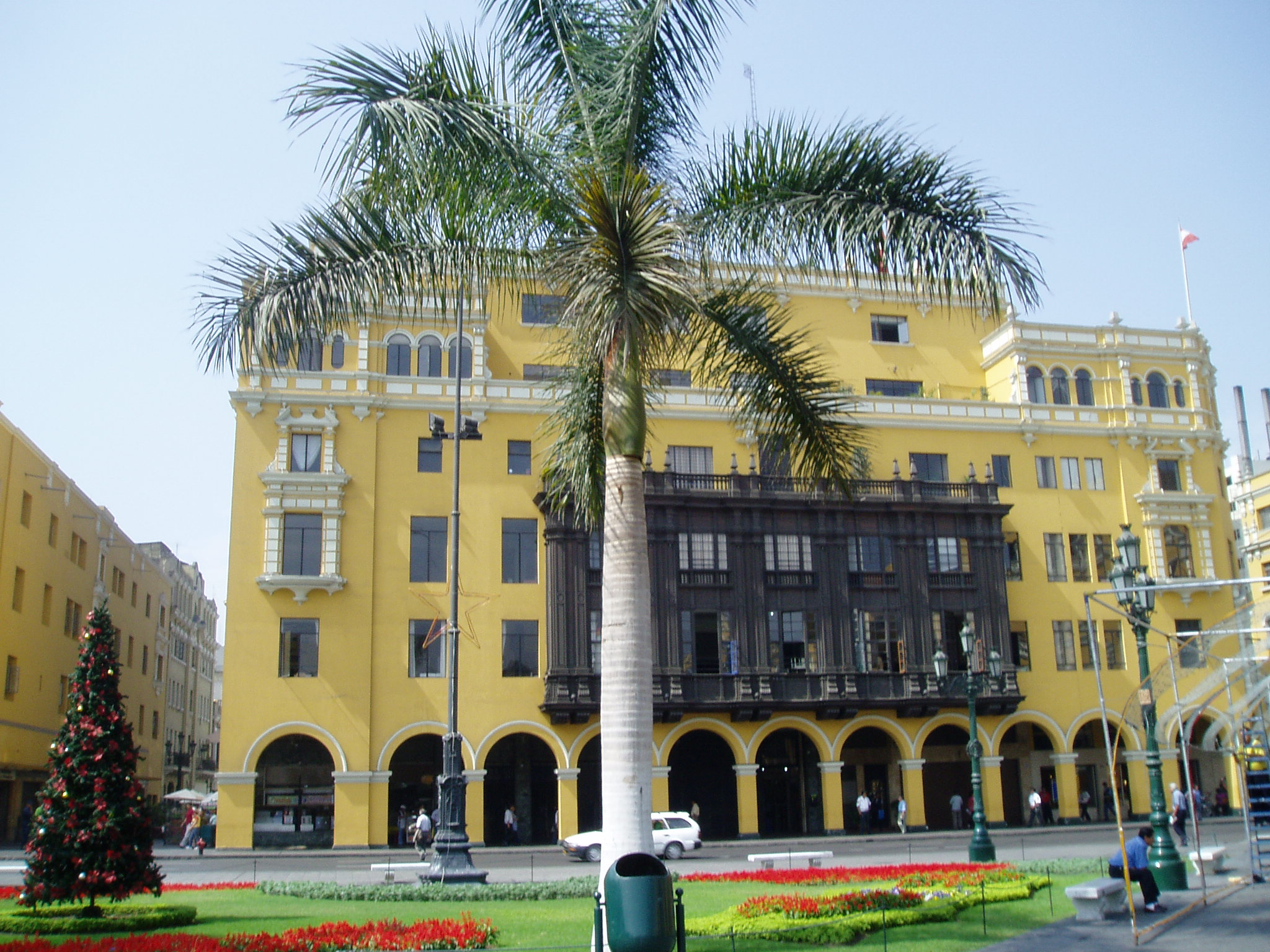
Headquarters

Caretas (lit. 'Masks', Spanish: [kaˈɾe.t̪as]) is a weekly newsmagazine published in Lima, Peru, renowned for its investigative journalism.

== History ==
Caretas was founded in October 1950 by Doris Gibson and Francisco Igartua.

In the mid-1950s, Gibson's son, Enrique Zileri, returned from Europe (from where he had been making contributions for the magazine) to join Caretas. Not long after, Igartua departed from the magazine and Zileri joined Gibson as co-director.

After several years of monthly publication, Caretas began to be published semi-monthly, and, since 1979, weekly. A new edition currently appears every Thursday.

Caretas focuses on Peruvian-related topics, ranging from historic coups (it was founded during Odría's regime), corruption scandals, presidential elections, crimes of passion, sports, to wars and terrorism. Since the mid-1980s, Caretas has imitated Time magazine by naming a Man of the Year in the year-end issue of the magazine, called Premio a la Resistencia (Prize to the Resistance).

The publication's first all-color cover featured Peruvian model Gladys Zender, who became Latin America's first Miss Universe in 1957.

In the first years of the 1990s, Gibson (who in the previous years had stepped down as director to become president of the directory, leaving the whole direction to Zileri) left the magazine due to her advanced age.

In 2005, Caretas launched a second magazine, Ellos&Ellas, published and distributed for free along with it. Ellos&Ellas covers Lima's socialité, health and fashion topics.

Zileri remained as Caretas' director up to November 2007, when the magazine reached its 2000th edition. He resigned the position to his son, Marco Zileri, politics editor up to then, and assumed the directory presidency.

== Notable Caretas journalists ==
- Mario Vargas Llosa
- César Hildebrandt
- Alfredo Barnechea
- Gustavo Gorriti
- José Rodríguez Elizondo
- Jaime Bedoya
- Fernando Ampuero
- Luisa Kam Mont
- José Adolph
