= Teleislas =

Colombian television network

- Type: Free-to-air television network
- Country: Colombia
- Broadcast area: San Andrés and Providencia; Nationwide (cable and satellite)
- Headquarters: San Andrés

Programming
- Languages: Spanish; English; San Andrés Creole
- Picture format: 1080i HDTV (downscaled to 480i for the SDTV feed)

History
- Founded: July 10, 1973 (Simón Bolívar station owned by Inravisión); 1997 (Channel Seven); 2004 (Teleislas)
- Founder: Inravisión

Links
- Website: www.teleislas.gov.co

Availability

Terrestrial
- Analog VHF/UHF: Listings may vary

Teleislas is a Colombian regional public television channel, with headquarters in the island of San Andrés and covering San Andrés and Providencia, located in the Caribbean. The station launched in 1973 as an independent Inravisión station, older even than Teleantioquia, later it became an independent channel (Channel Seven) before becoming its current form in 2004. Its programming is general, and broadcasts in Spanish, English and San Andrés Creole.

== History ==
The station started broadcasting in on June 10, 1973, (Note: RTVC claims the station started broadcasting in 1974) as Estación Autónoma Simón Bolívar, set up by Inravisión, which had its own studios and editing suite. It was set up at the initiative of Inravisión president Misael Pastrana Borrero. Its output was a mix of national programs seen on two of the mainland channels (Cadena 1 and Cadena 2), as well as local productions such as Searchlight and Creole Show. The station was also used as a testing ground for future innovations on national television: it broadcast the 1978 FIFA World Cup final while mainlanders still saw it in black and white, which was also the station's first satellite broadcast. Local programming was done with a limited budget.

In 1984, a formal proposal to create Teleislas was proposed and accepted. By 1987, there were more local programs on air, adopting the name "Channel Seven" in popular jargon. This arrangement lasted until 1991, when the autonomous station ceased operating and was replaced by a composite relay of Cadena Uno and Cadena Dos (later Canal A) delivered using microwave. This composite feed ended in 1995, when Inravisión started delivering satellite feeds of its three channels (now also enabling relays of Canal 3), as well as installing transmitters for their respective relays. In 1997, an independent Teleislas entity was created, whereas full regional programming resumed in 2004, for six hours a day. In January 2005, the station was not available in Providencia, as the National Television Council was still pending approval for a television transmitter there.

On April 14, 2005, a group protested at Channel Seven/Teleislas's facilities, demanding more local programs regarding their culture, and the sacking of Katherine Méndez de Ávila, on the grounds that she didn't speak English. In the late 2000s, its productions were seen abroad on Región Colombia Internacional.

In July 2015, Teleislas started digital terrestrial television broadcasts.

In September 2023, the station's new headquarters at San Andrés were announced, costing COP$14,500, with an additional COP$10,000 in technological upgrades. The ICT Ministry announced on August 1, 2025, that it would initiate a public contest to select Raizal artwork for use in the station's new facilities.

== Raizal TV ==
Raizal TV is a side channel created by Teleislas on July 8, 2022, broadcasting on LCN 108 or 109, depending on the area of coverage. Initially, the channel did not afford a 24-hour schedule; as of 2025, its line-up consisted of Teleislas programs for 30% of the schedule, while the rest consisted of relays of CaribVision, a pan-Caribbean television network. The channel broadcasts entirely in San Andrés Creole (some Teleislas programs) and English.
