= Televisión Regional del Oriente =

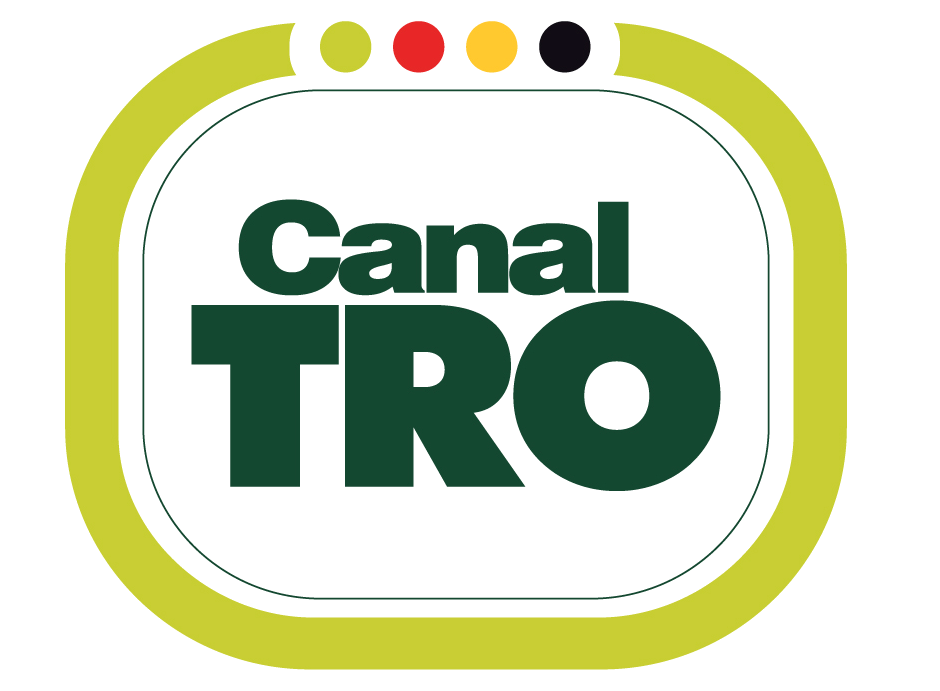
- Type: Free-to-air television network
- Country: Colombia
- Broadcast area: Santander and Norte de Santander

Programming
- Language(s): Spanish
- Picture format: 1080i HDTV

History
- Founded: 1997
- Launched: June 22, 1995; 29 years ago

Links
- Website: www.canaltro.com

Televisión Regional del Oriente (Eastern Regional Television, TRO) is a Colombian regional public television network, created in 1997. Its signal reaches Santander and Norte de Santander and broadcasts from Bucaramanga and Cúcuta.

Most of TRO's programming is educational and cultural.
