= Telecafé =

Colombian public television channel

- Type: Free-to-air television network
- Country: Colombia
- Broadcast area: Caldas, Quindío and Risaralda; Nationwide (cable and satellite)

Programming
- Language: Spanish
- Picture format: 1080i HDTV

Ownership
- Owner: Televisión Regional del Eje Cafetero

History
- Launched: October 17, 1992; 33 years ago

Links
- Website: telecafe.gov.co

Availability

Terrestrial
- Analog VHF/UHF: Listings may vary
- Digital UHF: Channel 17.1 (HD); Channel 17.2 (HD2)

Telecafé is a Colombian regional public television channel, launched on October 17, 1992.

The channel covers the departments of Caldas, Quindío and Risaralda. It broadcasts from studios in the cities of Manizales, Armenia and Pereira.

Its programming is general.

== History ==
The abstract plan behind Telecafé began in 1984, when the first approaches to formulate the project began, then in 1986, the first test broadcasts were conducted. In 1990, the company was formed, and began broadcasting two years later. Unlike the more established regional channels, the station was entirely responsible for its programming until 1994.
