= Telepacífico =

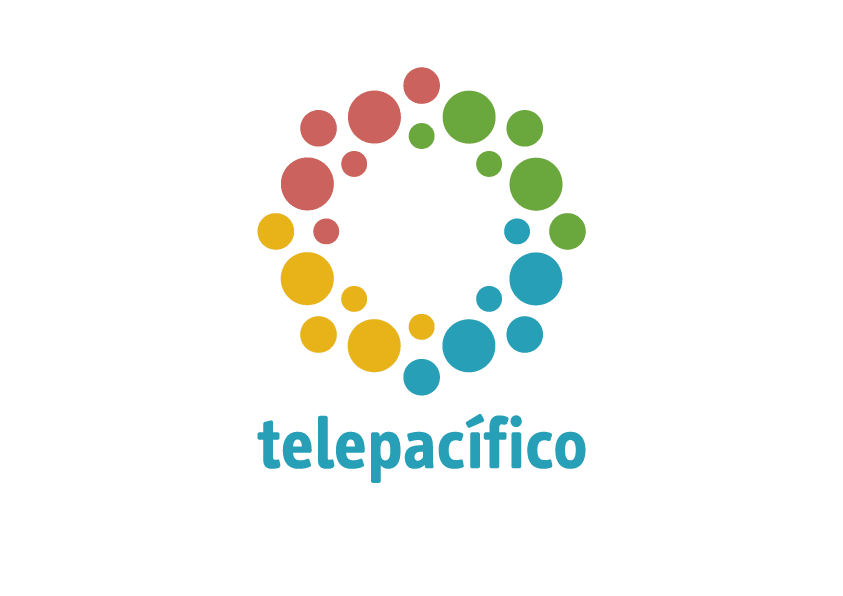
- Type: Free-to-air television network
- Country: Colombia
- Broadcast area: Valle del Cauca, Chocó, Cauca and Nariño; Nationwide (cable and satellite)
- Headquarters: Cali

Programming
- Language(s): Spanish
- Picture format: 1080i HDTV (downscaled to 480i for the SD feed)

Ownership
- Owner: Infivalle; Government of Valle del Cuaca

History
- Launched: March 7, 1988; 37 years ago

Links
- Website: telepacifico.com

Availability

Terrestrial
- Analog VHF/UHF: Listings may vary
- Digital UHF: Channel 17.1 (HD)

Telepacífico is a Colombian regional public television network, created in 1986 as the city of Cali celebrated its 450th anniversary. It started broadcasting on July 3, 1988, with 24 weekly programming hours. It was the third regional network in the country, after Teleantioquia, created in 1985, and Telecaribe, created in 1986.

Its signal reaches Western Colombia (Valle del Cauca, Chocó, Cauca and Nariño), although it can be received via satellite since 1996.

Telepacífico stands out for its educational and informative programming. The EDUCA TV programme, started in 2001, was taken by Colombian Education Ministry as a national model.

Some of the most known and talented Colombian newscasters and journalists have worked at its news shows: Mabel Kremer, Vicky Dávila, Isaac Nessim, Claudia Palacios, and Silvia Corzo.
