= Canal Capital =

Colombian local public television channel

- Type: Free-to-air television network
- Country: Colombia
- Broadcast area: Bogotá and Cundinamarca; Nationwide (cable and satellite)
- Headquarters: Bogotá

Programming
- Language(s): Spanish
- Picture format: 1080i HDTV (downscaled to 480i for the SDTV feed)

Ownership
- Owner: Alcaldía Mayor de Bogotá; Canal Capital
- Key people: Paula Arenas Canal

History
- Founded: November 14, 1995; 29 years ago
- Launched: November 3, 1997; 27 years ago

Links
- Website: www.canalcapital.gov.co

Availability

Terrestrial
- Analog VHF/UHF: Listings may vary
- Digital UHF: Channel 28.1

Canal Capital is a Colombian local public television channel, launched 3 November 1997, operated as an industrial and commercial company, property of the government of Bogotá. Its programming is general, though focused on political, cultural, and educational programmes.
