= Canal Trece =

- Type: Terrestrial television, Public broadcast television network
- Country: Colombia

Programming
- Picture format: 1080i HDTV (upscaled to 16:9 480i for the channel's standard resolution signal)

Ownership
- Owner: Government of Colombia (publicly operated by Inravisión Sistema de Medios Públicos)
- Sister channels: Señal Colombia; Canal Institucional; Trece+

History
- Launched: September 1, 1998; 28 years ago
- Former names: Teveandina (1998-2002); Canal 13 (2002-2012); Canal TR3CE (2012-2016)

Links
- Website: https://canaltrece.com.co/

Availability

Terrestrial
- Digital UHF: Channel 23
- Analog VHF/UHF: Channel 13 (Bogota, listings may vary)

Canal Trece (stylized as Trece.) is a Colombian free-to-air television network with regional coverage, specialized in cultural programming. Being a public television station, it is owned by the Colombian Government and its operations are managed by the Inravisión Public Media System. The headquarters of the channel are located in Bogotá.

Conceived originally as part of a project to assign a departmental public television channel to the Boyacá department, the channel was officially launched on September 1, 1998, under the name of Teveandina. It was available in Bogotá and 14 other Colombian departments: Amazonas, Arauca, Boyacá, Caquetá, Casanare, Cundinamarca, Guainía, Guaviare, Huila, Meta, Putumayo, Tolima, Vaupés and Vichada.

At first, the channel was limited to the broadcasting of programming blocks acquired by third-party companies on their own signal, who rented space to sell their productions. After the inauguration of the first private channels in the country in 1998, the channel went through a great economic crisis due to the fall in the audience that brought the opening of signals. Due to this, several production companies migrated to Caracol and RCN as main clients, so Teveandina started issuing infomercials to keep their signal on air. However, in 2000 the channel declared bankruptcy. But Telecom Colombia (currently Movistar Colombia), the majority shareholder of the channel, contributed 700 million pesos to maintain the company, and the National Television Authority (ANTV) contributed 200 million pesos more to pay the salaries of employees.

In 2001 the channel administration was changed, and a new direction was sought for the business, identifying a market niche that until then was neglected by both public and private channels: Young people. With this new approach, the name of Teveandina was changed to Canal Trece, the image was redesigned and a new stage began. In this way, the structure of the canal was redesigned, creating programming for young people, which implied starting to produce in the channel's facilities, something that had not been conceived in its beginnings.

In 2004, the management assumed a new administration that has sought to position and consolidate the image through various strategies, among which are adopting the color orange as a distinctive, reducing the percentage of videos and increasing the programming of other types. Special emphasis was given to the commercialization of the channel's programs, so that it became the channel's most important item and together with the production services, it has made the channel sustainable and profitable. With the liquidation of Telecom, Canal Trece became the property of RTVC and the Colombian ministry of telecommunications, since it owns 91% of the shares of the entity and the remaining 9% to the Governments of Boyacá, Caquetá, Casanare, Cundinamarca, Guaviare, Huila, Meta, Putumayo and Tolima.
