= Teleantioquia =

Colombian television network

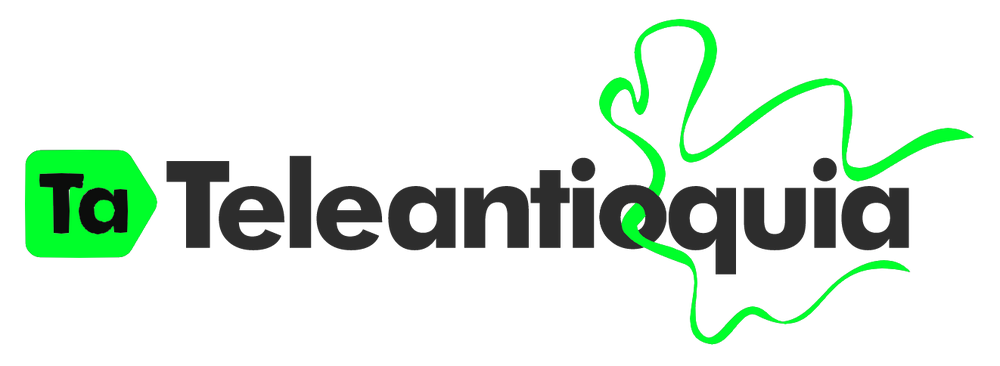
- Type: Free-to-air television network
- Country: Colombia
- Broadcast area: Antioquia and Chocó; Nationwide (cable and satellite)
- Headquarters: Medellín

Programming
- Language(s): Spanish
- Picture format: 1080i HDTV (downscaled to 480i for the SDTV feed)

History
- Founded: January 23, 1985 (as a television programadora)
- Launched: August 11, 1985 (as a television channel)
- Founder: Belisario Betancur

Links
- Website: www.teleantioquia.co

Availability

Terrestrial
- Analog VHF/UHF: Listings may vary
- Digital UHF: Channel 18.1 (HD); Channel 18.2 (HD2); Channel 18.7 (SD)

Teleantioquia is a Colombian regional public television channel, with headquarters in Medellín. Launched on August 11, 1985, it was the first regional channel in the country, initially only to cover the department of Antioquia. Subsequently, the channel expanded its emission capacity to neighboring Chocó. Its programming is general.
