= Telecaribe =

- Country: Colombia
- Broadcast area: Caribbean region Nationwide (cable and satellite)
- Headquarters: Barranquilla

Programming
- Language(s): Spanish
- Picture format: 1080i HDTV (downscaled to 480i for the SD feed)

Ownership
- Owner: Canal Regional del Television del Caribe

History
- Launched: October 10, 1986; 38 years ago

Links
- Website: telecaribe.com.co (in Spanish)

Availability

Terrestrial
- Analog UHF: Listings may vary
- Digital UHF: Channel 17.1 (HD)

Telecaribe is a regional television network for the Caribbean region of Colombia.

== History ==
The station was set up in the early 1980s in Valledupar, Colombia and was created by a local entrepreneur named Jose Jorge Dangond. It started as an unlicensed TV station and as a personal hobby with aficionado equipment brought from the United States, transmitting American movies and local vallenato musical groups, including first versions of the Vallenato Legend Festival. Dangond's family and friends in Valledupar nicknamed it Televallenato or Rope TV, because all the antennae and equipment were attached with ropes onto one of the highest buildings in the city.

By 1986 the Colombian Ministry of Communications detected the channel's signal and seized all the equipment. Dangond then started a legal battle to legalize the channel, which developed into a congressional proposal to create regional TV channels for every region of Colombia. Thus were born Telecaribe, Teleantioquia, Telepacífico, and other regional TV stations.

On this same year (on April 28), the station formally became Telecaribe, and the main equipment and studios were then moved to Barranquilla where it continued to develop and cover the entirety of Colombia's Caribbean region by setting up franchises or TV stations in the seven major cities of this region. Dangond was its founder and first director for almost 6 years before he was appointed consul general in Venezuela.

TELECARIBE is the third national TV channel most watched in northern Colombia.

Since 2018, Telecaribe took over the broadcast rights to the Miss Colombia pageant from former broadcaster RCN Television. While being a nationally owned regional broadcaster, its cable and digital coverage nationwide enables it to broadcast the event on all platforms (including online).
