= List of Colombian television series =

This is a list of Colombian television series, television programs, contests and general TV shows.

== Animation ==
- Betty Toons (2002, RCN Televisión)
- El siguiente programa (1997, Cenpro TV)
- Puerto papel (2015, Señal Colombia)

== Anthology series ==
- El cuento del domingo (1980–1993, RTI Producciones)

== Children ==
- Animalandia
- Bichos Bichez
- Buscando Amigos
- Chiz Garabiz
- Club 10
- Cumpleaños Ramo
- De Pies a Cabeza
- Descubro mi mundo
- Imagínate (1987, Producciones PUNCH)
- Jack el Despertador
- La Brújula Mágica
- La Libélula Dorada
- Llegaron los Monachos
- Los Dumis
- Maxi mini TV
- Notti Tutti Cuanti
- Oki Doki (1992–1997, RCN TV)
- Pequeños gigantes (1983, Caracol Televisión)
- Siempre Juntos
- Tú lo conoces, tú lo construyes
- Verde Manzana
- Zoológico ecológico
- Sabor a Limon

== Comedy ==
- Caballo viejo (1988, Caracol Televisión)
- Caleroscopio (2006)
- Casados con Hijos (2005–2006)
- Cazados (1995, Producciones PUNCH)
- Chispazos (1987–1993, Producciones Cinevisión)
- Clon Estilo
- Dejémonos de Vainas
- Don Chinche (1983–1990, RTI Producciones)
- El Siguiente Programa
- La Banda
- La Diva (2006)
- La posada (1987–1992, TeVecine)
- La Tele
- Las Señoritas Gutiérrez
- Los Francotiradores
- Los Pérez Somos Así
- Leche (1995–1996, Caracol Televisión)
- N.N. (1990–1995, Colombiana de Televisión)
- No me lo Cambie
- Noticiero Quack
- O todos en la cama (1997, RCN TV)
- Pido la Parola
- ¿Quién Manda a Quien? (2006)
- Romeo y buseta (1988–1992, TeVecine)
- Sábados Felices (1972–present)
- Sabor a limón (1995, RCN TV)
- Shampoo
- Si nos dejan (1991, Producciones PUNCH)
- También Caeras (1999–present)
- Te quiero pecas (1988, RCN TV)
- Todos en la Cama
- Vuelo secreto (1991–1999, Producciones PUNCH)
- Yo y Tú (1956–1976; 1982; 1985)
- Zoociedad

== Contests/Game shows ==
- ¿Cuánto Sabe? Punch le Paga
- ¿Cuánto Vale su Actuación?
- ¿Quiere Cacao?
- 20.000 por su Respuesta (1968)
- Alcance la Estrella
- Cabeza y Cola
- Cante y Gane
- Cazadores de la Fortuna (1994)
- Cien Colombianos Dicen
- Componga
- Compre la Orquesta
- Concéntrese (1968; 1986)
- Conteste y Dana le Paga (1958)
- Dígalo Cantando (2007)
- Do Re Millones: La Orquesta de la fortuna
- D1 (2006)
- El Jugador (2007)
- El Poder del 10 (2008)
- El Programa del Millón
- Gánele al Reloj con Philips
- Golazo Fruco (1969)
- Guerra de Estrellas
- Los Tres a las 6
- Miles de Pesos por sus Respuestas
- Nada más que la Verdad (2007)
- Nescafé paga las Letras (1958)
- Reina por un Día (1969)
- Respuesta al Desafio
- Sabariedades
- Sabes más que un Niño de Primaria (2008)
- Telectronico
- El Precio es Correcto
- Quién Quiere ser Millonario?

== Cultural ==
- Carta de Colombia
- Cinearte
- Conozca a los Autores
- Correo Especial
- El Juicio
- El Mundo al Vuelo
- El Pasado en Presente
- Esta es su Vida (1954)
- Maestros
- Mares y Marinos de Colombia
- Naturalia
- Vida del siglo XX
- Yo Sé Quién Sabe lo que Usted no Sabe

== Drama ==
- Amas de casa desesperadas (2007)
- Así Es La Vida (RCN, Univision)
- Así Fue
- Crónicas de una generación trágica (1993, TeVecine, Canal Uno)
- Decisiones (1990; 2006)
- Dialogando (1972–1989)
- Este es mi Caso
- Francisco el Matemático (1998–2004)
- Hombres (1996, RCN TV)
- Juego Limpio (2006)
- La vorágine (1975, RCN TV)
- Padres e Hijos (1993–2009)
- Pandillas, guerra y paz 2 (2009–2010, Fox Telecolombia)
- Pandillas, guerra y paz (1998–2002, Fox Telecolombia)
- Puerta grande (1992, RCN TV)
- Simón el mago (1992, Víctor Gaviria)
- Sueños y espejos (1995, Coestrellas)
- Teatro Popular Caracol
- Vendaval (1974)
- Vuelo 15.03 (2006)

== Entertainment ==
- Blanca y Pura
- CineArte
- Circo Romano
- Día a Día
- Doble vía
- El Club de la Television
- El Lavadero
- El Mundo Según Pirry
- El Show de Jimmy
- El Show de las Estrellas
- Esta Noche Sí
- Estilo RCN
- Estudio 15
- EstudioUno
- Los Cuentos De Diva: El Programa
- Lucho y su Gloria
- Muy Buenos Días
- Noches de Colombia
- Panorama
- Sweet, el dulce sabor del chisme
- Telehipódromo
- Tu tele
- Yo, José Gabriel

== Musical ==
- Quieta Margarita (1988, Caracol Televisión)

== Mystery ==
- Los cuervos (1984–1986, RTI Producciones)

== News ==
- 24 Horas
- CityNoticias
- Contrapunto
- Noticiero TV Hoy
- El radar
- Noticias CM&
- Noticias Caracol
- Noticias RCN
- Noticias Uno
- Noticiero Criptón
- Noticiero Grafico (1954)
- Noticiero Nacional
- Noticiero Suramericana
- Noticiero de las 7
- QAP Noticias
- Reportero Esso (1956)
- Séptimo día
- Telediario con Arturo Abella

== Reality Shows ==
- El Triángulo (2003)
- Colombia tiene talento (2012)
- La Bella y el Nerdo (2006)
- Gran Hermano (2003)
- Bogotá Real
- La Isla de los Famosos (2004)
- Bailando por un Sueño (2005–2006)
- Desafío (2004–present)
- El Huésped (2003)
- Estrella Azul
- El Gran Partido (2004–2005)
- La Granja Tolima (2004)
- Nómadas (2005)
- Popstars
- Protagonistas de Novela (2002)
- Protagonistas de Nuestra Tele (2012)
- Se Busca (2003)
- Expedición Robinson (2001–2002)
- Tengo una Ilusión (2005–2006)
- El Aprendiz (2005)
- El factor X (2005–present)
- Los Reyes de la Pista (2006)
- Yo me llamo (2011–2012)

== Sitcom ==
- Dejémonos de vainas (1984–1998, Coestrellas, [)

== Sports ==
- Cabalgata Deportiva Gillette
- Campeones en Acción (1964)
- Fútbol, el Mejor Espectáculo del Mundo (1982)
- Fuera de Lugar
- Futbolmania RCN
- Gol Caracol
- La Telepolémica
- Lunes Deportivo
- Momentos Mágicos del Deporte (1964)
- Noticiero Deportivo León (1963)
- Noticiero Deportivo
- Reportero Deportivo Cauchosol (1963)
- Tribuna Caliente

Pasión de gavilanes

== Youth-oriented ==
- Clase aparte (1994-1995, RTI Producciones, Cenpro TV)
- Conjunto cerrado (1996, RTI Producciones)
- De pies a cabeza (1993, Cenpro TV)
- Décimo grado (1985–1989, Cenpro TV)
- Padres e hijos (1993–2009, Caracol Televisión, Colombiana de Televisión)
- Sin límites (1998, Caracol Televisión)

== See also ==
- List of Colombian telenovelas
- Cinema of Colombia
- Culture of Colombia
- Colombian comedy
