= CPT (programadora) =

Colombian TV production companies

CPT (Compañía Productora de Televisión) was a Colombian programadora that operated in several incarnations from 1979 to 2003.

== Producciones Eduardo Lemaitre y Cía. (1979–1988) ==
The company started under the name Producciones Eduardo Lemaitre y Cía Ltda. in 1979. In the licitación of that year, it received a paltry 1 1/2 hours a week of programming.

The flagship program of this programadora, which aired in one of Colombian television's best timeslots (Sundays, 8 p.m., Primera Cadena), was Revivamos nuestra historia (Let's Revive Our History). Since Lemaitre lived in Cartagena (and since most of the national television infrastructure was and is centered in Bogotá), Promec Televisión produced the programs (but Lemaitre had final approval of the scripts and contents). Promec also marketed the other half-hour a week that this programadora was allocated (Friday 5 p.m., Cadena Dos; originally home to the program Debates Lemaitre, it soon was replaced with The Pink Panther Show.

In the licitación of 1983, in which Lemaitre received 3.5 hours a week, Revivamos nuestra historia (renamed in 1985 to Revivamos la historia) moved from 8 p.m. to 8:30 p.m. (directly after Noticiero Promec), where it would remain until its cancellation in 1987 due to high program costs. Other programs in this time period included Telesemana with Jota Mario Valencia on Saturday mornings, then on Saturday afternoons in conjunction with Producciones Cinevisión; a spinoff of Revivamos nuestra historia known as Revivamos Nuestra Historia Universal featuring world history topics; and a Saturday afternoon sports news program called Deportevé con Oscar Rentería.

The licitación of 1987 awarded Lemaitre 4 hours a week, used to broadcast shows like the TV series Genghis Khan, the journalistic program Nuestro Colombia, Grandes Series Mundiales, and the animated El Correcaminos.

Lemaitre also teamed up with Promec in another area: the programming of movies for holidays (festivos), beginning in 1984 and continuing through 1991.

In 1988, Producciones Eduardo Lemaitre was sold to Humberto Arbeláez, the founder of Promec. Under his direction, the programadora took on a new name: CPT (Compañía Productora de Televisión).

== CPT (1988–1993) ==
This first incarnation of CPT inherited Lemaitre's four hours a week of programming, plus it continued to program festivos. Most of the programs stayed. Debts piled up, and CPT (like Promec and Gegar Televisión) did not place a bid in the licitación of 1991, exiting television in August of that year.

CPT however did come back briefly in 1992–93 to program festivos on Canal A.

== CPT (1997–2003) ==
In 1997, the dead CPT was acquired by Fernando Barrero Chávez, Gustavo Castro Caicedo and Francisco José Pereira, placing a bid in that year's licitación. It was awarded 9.5 hours a week on Canal A, airing programs including Sexo Sentido con Lucía Nader, the War of the Worlds TV series, and Todo por la Plata, transferred from DFL Televisión. It also partnered with Andes Televisión to air the Premier Caracol movie for the first seven months of 1998. (Caracol was not awarded any timeslots on Saturday prior to becoming a private channel; Sábados Felices was being presented by Coestrellas, CPS and Proyectamos Televisión.) CPT, however, did not receive a news license, for which it had bid.

By 2001, CPT, amidst the rapidly growing programadoras crisis, had fallen under Ley 550, Colombia's then-bankruptcy reorganization law. It would leave the air in 2003.
