= List of Colombian telenovelas =

This is a list of Colombian telenovelas.

- ¡Ay cosita linda mamá!
- ¿Por qué diablos?
- ¿Por qué mataron a Betty si era tan buena muchacha? (1991, RTI Producciones)
- ¿Quién amará a María?
- Ángel de la guarda, mi dulce compañía
- Alicia en el País de la Mercancías
- Almas de piedra (1994, TeVecine, Canal Uno)
- Amantes del Desierto
- Amar y vivir (1988–1990, RTI Producciones)
- Amor a Mil
- Amor a la Plancha
- Amor de mis Amores
- Amor en Custodia
- Amores Cruzados
- Amores de Mercado
- Ana de negro (1991, RTI Producciones)
- Azúcar (1989, RCN TV)
- Bella Calamidades
- Bermúdez
- Brujeres
- Código de Pasión
- Cómplices
- Caballo Viejo
- Café, con aroma de mujer (1994, RCN TV)
- Calamar (1989, Caracol Televisión)
- Candela (1994–1995, Caracol Televisión)
- La Caponera
- Cara o Sello, Dos Rostros de Mujer
- Carolina Barrantes
- Cartas de amor (1997, Cenpro TV)
- Castillo de Naipes
- Las Cinco Caras del Amor
- Conjunto Cerrado
- Copas amargas
- Corazón Prohibido
- Crimen y Castigo
- Criminal: El Camino Del Mal
- Cuando quiero llorar no lloro (Los Victorinos) (1990, RTI Producciones)
- La Dama de Troya
- De Pies a Cabeza
- Detrás de un ángel (1993, RTI Producciones)
- Dios se lo pague (1998, Caracol Televisión)
- Divorciada
- Doña Barbara
- Doña Bella
- Don Chinche
- Dora, La Celadora
- Dos mujeres (1997, RTI Producciones)
- Ecomoda
- El Ángel de Piedra
- El 0597 está ocupado
- El Baile de la Vida
- El capo
- El Cartel de los Sapos
- El Cartel 2
- El Círculo
- El Fiscal
- El Inútil
- El Joe, La Leyenda
- El Manantial
- El Nombre del Amor
- El Precio del Silencio
- El manantial (1996, Producciones JES)
- El oasis (1995, Cenpro TV)
- El pasado no perdona (1990–1991, Producciones PUNCH)
- El pasado no perdona 2 (2005, Fox Telecolombia, RCN TV)
- La Elegida
- En Los Tacones De Eva
- En cuerpo ajeno (1992, RTI Producciones, Organización de Televisión Iberoamericana)
- Enigmas del más allá
- Entre Amores
- Escalona (1991, Caracol Televisión)
- Eternamente Manuela (1995, RCN TV)
- Flor de oro (1995–1996, Caracol Televisión)
- Francisco el matématico
- Fuego Verde
- Fuera de Foco
- Gallito Ramírez (1986, Caracol Televisión)
- El Gallo de Oro
- Garzas al amanecer (1988–1990, RCN TV)
- Guajira (1996, RCN TV)
- Hasta que la plata nos separe
- Herencia maldita (1990, RTI Producciones)
- Hermosa Niña
- La Hija del Mariachi
- Hilos Invisibles
- Hilos de amor
- Historias de Hombres solo para Mujeres
- Hombres
- Juan Joyita quiere ser Caballero
- Juego Limpio
- Juegos Prohibidos
- Juliana que mala eres (1997, Caracol Televisión)
- LP loca pasión (1989, RTI Producciones)
- La abuela (1978, RTI Producciones)
- La Baby-sister
- La bella Ceci y el imprudente ("The Beautiful Ceci and the imprudent one")
- La casa de las dos palmas (1991, RCN TV)
- La Ciudad Grita
- La Costeña y El Cachaco
- La Dama del Pantano
- La Diosa Coronada
- La elegida (1997, TeVecine, Caracol Televisión)
- La Ex
- La Guerra de las Rosas
- La Madre
- La mala hora
- La maldición del paraíso (1993, Producciones JES)
- La Marca del Deseo
- La mujer doble (1992, Caracol Televisión)
- La mujer del presidente (1997, Caracol Televisión)
- La mujer en el espejo (1997, Cenpro TV)
- La mujer en el espejo (2004, Caracol Televisión, RTI Producciones)
- La Niña
- La otra mitad del sol (1996, Cenpro TV)
- La otra raya del tigre (1993, RCN TV)
- La Pezuña del Diablo
- La potra zaina (1993, RCN TV)
- La Prepago
- La Quiero a morir
- La Saga, Negocio de Familia
- La Sombra del Arco Iris
- La sombra del deseo (1996, Caracol Televisión)
- La Tormenta
- La Traición
- La Venganza
- La viuda de blanco (1996, RTI Producciones)
- Las aguas mansas (1994, Telemundo, RTI Producciones)
- Las ejecutivas (1995, Caracol Televisión)
- Las juanas (1997, RCN TV)
- Leche
- Loca Pasión
- Lola Calamidades
- Lorena
- Los Cuervos
- Los pecados de Inés de Hinojosa (1988, RTI Producciones)
- Los Perez, somos así
- Los Reyes
- Lucerito (1992, Jorge Barón Televisión)
- Luna, La Heredera
- Luzbel esta de visita
- Música maestro (1990, Caracol Televisión)
- Madre Luna
- Mambo (1994, Producciones JES)
- María (1991, RCN TV)
- María bonita (1995, RTI Producciones)
- María Madrugada
- Marido y Mujer
- Mascarada (1996, Producciones JES)
- Maten al león (1989, RTI Producciones, Telecaribe)
- Me Amaras Bajo La Lluvia
- Me Llaman Lolita
- Merlina, Mujer Divina
- Mesa Para Tres
- Mi pequeña mamá
- Milagros de Amor
- Momposina (1994, RCN TV)
- Nadie es eterno en el mundo
- Niños Ricos, Pobres Padres
- No juegues con mi vida (1989, RTI Producciones)
- No renuncies Salomé
- Nuevo rico, nuevo pobre
- O Todos en la Cama
- Otra en mí (1996, TeVecine)
- Pa' Machos
- Pablo Escobar: El Patrón del Mal
- Pasión de gavilanes
- Pasiones secretas (1993, Caracol Televisión)
- Pecado santo (1995, TeVecine)
- Pecados Capitales
- Pedro El Escamoso
- Perfume de agonía (1997, Producciones JES)
- Pero sigo siendo el Rey
- Perro amor (1998–1999, Cenpro TV)
- Pobre Pablo
- Pocholo
- Por Amor
- Prisioneros del amor (1997, Pawell Nowicky, Caracol Televisión)
- Puerto Amor
- Pura Sangre
- Quieta Margarita
- Rauzán
- La Reina de Queens
- Reinas
- Retratos
- La Séptima Puerta
- Sín límites
- Sabor a Limón
- San Tropel
- Sangre de lobo (1992, Producciones JES)
- Sara un grito en el silencio
- Sarabanda
- Señora Isabel (1993, Coestrellas)
- Señora bonita (1991, Jorge Barón Televisión)
- Se armó la Gorda
- Si nos dejan
- Siete veces Amada
- Sin tetas no hay paraíso
- Sobrevivir (1997, Colteve)
- Sofia dame tiempo
- Soledad
- Solo una mujer (1994, Caracol Televisión)
- Solterita y a la Orden
- Sueños y espejos
- Te voy a enseñar a querer
- Tiempos difíciles (1995, Cenpro TV)
- Tiro de gracia (2015, Caracol Televisión, Televisa)
- Todos Quieren con Marilyn
- Traga Maluca
- Tuyo es mi corazón (1985, Caracol Televisión)
- Un Ángel llamado Azul
- Vecinos
- Vendaval (1974, RTI Producciones)
- Victoria
- Vida de mi vida (1994, TeVecine)
- El Vuelo de la Cometa
- Yo Soy Betty, La Fea
- Yo soy Franky
- Yo amo a Paquita Gallego (1997, RTI Producciones)
- Yo no te pido la luna
- Yo y Tú
- Zorro: La Espada y la Rosa
