= Proyectamos Televisión =

Colombian television program producer (1981–2003)

Proyectamos Televisión (sometimes styled as Proyectamos TV) was a Colombian programadora that operated between 1981 and March 2003.

== History ==
It was founded in Cali, making it distinctive among the programadoras. The majority of television infrastructure in the country was concentrated in the Bogotá area. The original owners were the singer Isadora, the businessman and producer Fernando Parra Duque and Clara María Ochoa.

=== The Isadora era, 1981-91 ===
Proyectamos at the start picked up two hours of weekly programs and used them to broadcast El Show de Isadora, hosted by the singer and aired on Fridays, as well as two foreign telenovelas and an educational program, Vamos al Zoológico Ecológico Lógico, all broadcast on Cadena 2.

In the 1983 bidding cycle it ramped up production to 3.5 hours a week. El Show de Isadora moved to Tuesdays. Many of its other programs were imports. Several changes occurred to their program slate during this time, and in 1985, another success for Proyectamos, the Thursday night program Enfoques, made its debut.

The 1987 bidding cycle marked another increase in output for Proyectamos, as it was awarded 4.5 hours a week. Now it began to produce its own dramas and comedies. El Diario de Amar, Papi es un Disastre and others now came on the air on Wednesday and Thursday afternoons. Enfoques fell victim in the ratings to its new Sunday night competition, the powerful Premier Caracol movie. Along with Producciones JES and Cenpro Televisión Proyectamos created a rival, La Película del Domingo (The Sunday Movie). Enfoques would migrate to Wednesdays.

=== The R.T.I. era, 1992-2003 ===
Businessman Tulio Ángel Arbeláez bought Proyectamos Televisión in 1992, at the start of a new bidding cycle that gave it eight hours a week on Cadena Uno. On Friday, February 14, 1992, Proyectamos changed its corporate image.

The majority of Proyectamos Televisión's programs came from R.T.I. Colombia. Among the new slots assigned to Proyectamos was a block of telenovelas presented jointly with R.T.I. and Producciones Cinevisión, airing Alcanzar una Estrella 2, Valeria y Maximiliano and others. There were other spaces, including Debates Caracol (a joint production with Caracol Televisión) on Thursdays; Sailor Moon soon appeared on Friday afternoons.

In the mid-90s, its schedule changed somewhat; Quiere Cacao, an R.T.I. production, was now jointly presented by Proyectamos. With DFL Televisión it jointly presented Todo por la Plata, which DFL would later air itself on Canal A.

In the 1997 bidding cycle, Proyectamos crossed over to Canal A (along with R.T.I., Datos y Mensajes and Nuevos Días/En Vivo). It once more increased its output to 10.5 hours. Many of its assigned spaces in the 1998-2003 period were shared. One of the major productions of Proyectamos in this last bidding cycle was, along with Coestrellas and CPS, was Sábados Felices, inherited from Caracol which didn't receive any slots on Saturday (this went on for seven months in 1998).

After the departure of RCN to its own channel, Proyectamos and the other programadoras on Canal A received more timeslots, but they were later required to be returned.

=== Closure ===
The owner of Proyectamos Televisión, Arbeláez, presented to the Comisión Nacional de Televisión (CNTV) his own salvation plan for the public channels as the programadoras crisis, which had begun in 1998, became worse.

The last straw for Proyectamos was the banning of infomercials, or televentas, which had been allowed since 1995. In March 2003, both Proyectamos and Andes Televisión returned their spaces to the CNTV and were liquidated.
