= Promec Televisión =

Defunct Colombian TV production company

Promec Televisión (full name Corporación Promotora de Medios de Comunicación Social) was a Colombian programadora. It operated between 1973 and 1989.

== History ==
=== Early years ===
It was founded in October 1972 by several entrepreneurs who included Humberto Arbeláez and Jorge Yarce. It was a non-profit corporation. It began operations in 1973, with its first major success Dialogando, a docu-drama. Though it was new it came out of the licitación of 1973 with what was then one of Colombian television's prized timeslots: 8pm Thursdays on Primera Cadena. Dialogando was so successful it would remain on the air until 1989.

In the licitación of 1976 Promec received 3.5 hours of programming a week, including its first venture into foreign programs.

Other early programs were Las Señoritas Gutiérrez, a comedy written by María Victoria de Restrepo and whose family would found its own programadora in 1979. It competed against Caracol's mainstay Sábados Felices. Also in 1979, with a new licitación and four hours a week, it would enter the world of telenovelas, producing shows such as El Ángel de la Calle and Entre Primos. Promec was one of the first programadoras to bring Japanese anime to the country; it also created a programming block in 1982 known as Grandes Series Mundiales, in which various foreign programs were presented.

Promec would further expand its output to 4.5 hours a week after the bidding cycle of 1981.

=== Promec: much more than a programadora ===
Beginning in 1979, Promec had been loaning out equipment and services to other programadoras, including Producciones Eduardo Lemaitre, and producing programs such as Revivamos Nuestra Historia, Valores Humanos and Todos contra Todos. It founded the Colprensa news agency in 1981, edited and produced Arco magazine, and founded Producciones Promec, an independent concern that made available the company's production and post-production services, including commercial production. This arm would outlast the programadora, changing names in 1992 to Innovisión Video S.A.

In 1972, before Promec, Arbeláez had founded Procol, a talent cooperative which included actors, directors, and producers. Procol also created and produced shows for other programadoras, such as Pecados de Ayer in 1974 for Colombiana de Televisión.

=== In the news business ===
In 1983, Promec bid for and received a newscast as part of its six hours a week of programs. Noticiero Promec aired at the weekends at 8pm on Cadena Uno, quickly finding a rival in Producciones Cinevisión's Noticiero Cinevisión, newly moved from weekdays in the licitación of 1983. Gustavo Niño Mendoza, Jota Mario Valencia and Julio Nieto Bernal hosted the program during its four-year run. Promec did not bid again for a newscast, as Cinevisión won the ratings war.

In 1984, Promec for the first time bid for the special programming on holidays (festivos), becoming a pioneer in programming movies on those days along with Producciones Eduardo Lemaitre.

=== 1987-91: Decline and forced closure ===
The licitación of 1987, unlike others before it, did not treat Promec well. Though it now had 6.5 hours a week, a minor increase over 1983, most of the awarded timeslots were not of significant quality, located in the late mornings and later at night. They were seen as slots that were hard to commercialize. Large debts to Inravisión, low ratings, and program failures such as those of El rebusque and Sábados de Locura. In 1989, Promec handed over its spots to be programmed by Jorge Barón Televisión until the end of 1990. In 1991 they were operated by Luis Fernando Duque y Compañía.

Also in 1991, it was recommended to Inravisión by the National Television Council (CNTV) that Promec be placed under administrative expiration for its debts. The CNTV lamented this recommendation, as it considered Promec a serious programadora that had done good work. In June 1991, it returned its spaces to Inravisión, which were awarded to other programadoras, such as PUNCH, RCN and Colombiana de Televisión, in a smaller minilicitación in May 1991. It was one of four companies that disappeared in the period 1987-91; the other three were Jorge Enrique Pulido TV (after the death of its proprietor), Multimedia Televisión and Cromavisión, the latter two for the same reason as Promec.

The company still legally exists today under the same trade name.
