= Claudia Liliana González =

Colombian actress (born 1969)

Claudia Liliana González Aragón (born 1969) is a Colombian actress from Cali.

González studied Architecture but decided to become an actress after taking some acting courses while at college. She started to play small roles in television until 1994, when she played Daniela Reyes in the successful RCN TV telenovela Café con aroma de mujer. She suspended briefly her career after getting married, but returned in the 1998 Producciones Punch telenovela Amores como el nuestro.

As of 2009, she plays Captain Lina Vargas in the Caracol TV telenovela Bermúdez, and presents Deco Art in the cable channel Utilísima.

== Selected filmography ==
- Victorinos (2009, telenovela, Telemundo) as Lina María
- El Clon (2010, telenovela, Telemundo Studios Miami) as Clara
- Bermúdez (2009, telenovela, Caracol TV) as Lina Vargas
- Pocholo (2007, telenovela, Caracol TV) as Pachita
- Pecados capitales (2003, telenovela, Caracol TV) as Teresa
- Luzbel está de visita (2002, telenovela, RTI Colombia)
- Padres e hijos (2002, TV series, Colombiana de Televisión/Caracol TV)
- Marido y mujer (1999, telenovela, Caracol TV) as Ana Martha
- Amores como el nuestro (1998, telenovela, Producciones Punch/Canal Uno) as Martha de Restrepo
- Solo una mujer (1995, telenovela, Caracol TV/Cadena Uno)
- Cazados (1995, sitcom, Producciones Punch/Canal A)
- Solo una mujer (1995, TV Serie) as Matilde
- Lazos mortales (1994, TV Serie, Cali)
- Café con aroma de mujer (1994, telenovela, RCN TV/Canal A) as Daniela Reyes
- La casita del placer (teatro)
- Solo una mujer
