= Margalida Castro =

Colombian actress (1943–2024)

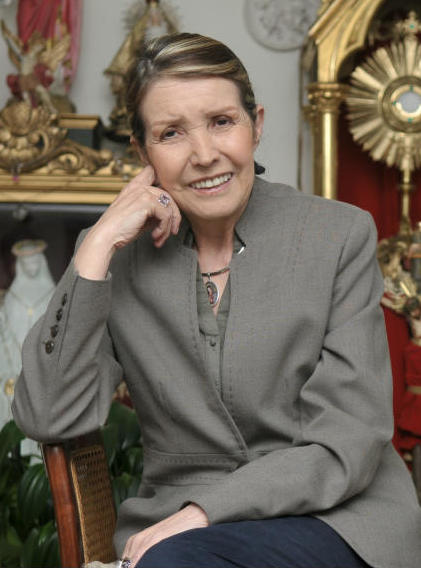
- Castro, 2013
- Born: Margalida Castro Rueda; 19 November 1943; San Gil, Santander, Colombia
- Died: 19 December 2024 (aged 81)
- Occupations: Actress; television presenter
- Years active: 1967–2024

Margalida Castro Rueda (19 November 1943 – 19 December 2024) was a Colombian theatre and television actress.

== Life and career ==
Born in San Gil, Santander, Castro grew up in Bogotá and studied music as a child. She entered Universidad Nacional de Colombia to study architecture; she also studied flute and was part of the university's orchestra, but she dropped her studies after meeting playwright Carlos Perozzo, with whom she would be married for six years. Her debut on Colombian television would be on the 1967 series La tercera palabra, directed by Bernardo Romero Lozano. Ever since she would appear in dozens of theatre plays and Colombian telenovelas and television series.

Castro died from cancer on 19 December 2024, at the age of 81.

== Selected filmography ==
- El secretario (Caracol TV, 2011) as Gertrudis Dudis Buenahora
- Chepe Fortuna (RCN TV, 2010) as Úrsula
- Victoria (RTI / TELEMUNDO, 2007) as Mercedes "Memé" de Santiesteban
- La Tormenta (RTI / Caracol TV / Telemundo, 2005) as María Teresa Marrero "La Sibila"
- La viuda de la mafia (RCN TV, 2005)
- La venganza (RTI / Caracol TV / Telemundo, 2002)
- Luzbel está de visita (RTI / Caracol TV, 2001)
- A dónde va Soledad (Tevecine / RCN TV, 2000)
- Yo amo a Paquita Gallego (RTI / Canal A, 1998) as María Isabel Vargas a.k.a. tía Chavela
- María bonita (RTI Colombia / Cadena Uno, 1996)
- Solo una mujer (Caracol TV / Cadena Uno, 1995)
- Caballo viejo (Caracol TV / Cadena 2, 1988) as La sietelenguas
- Gallito Ramírez (1986) as Sussy Borda Lavalle)
- El taxista millonario (film, 1979)
- Yo y tú (Canal Nacional, 1968) as Gringa Peggy
