= Pedro González (humorist) =

Colombian humorist, journalist and actor

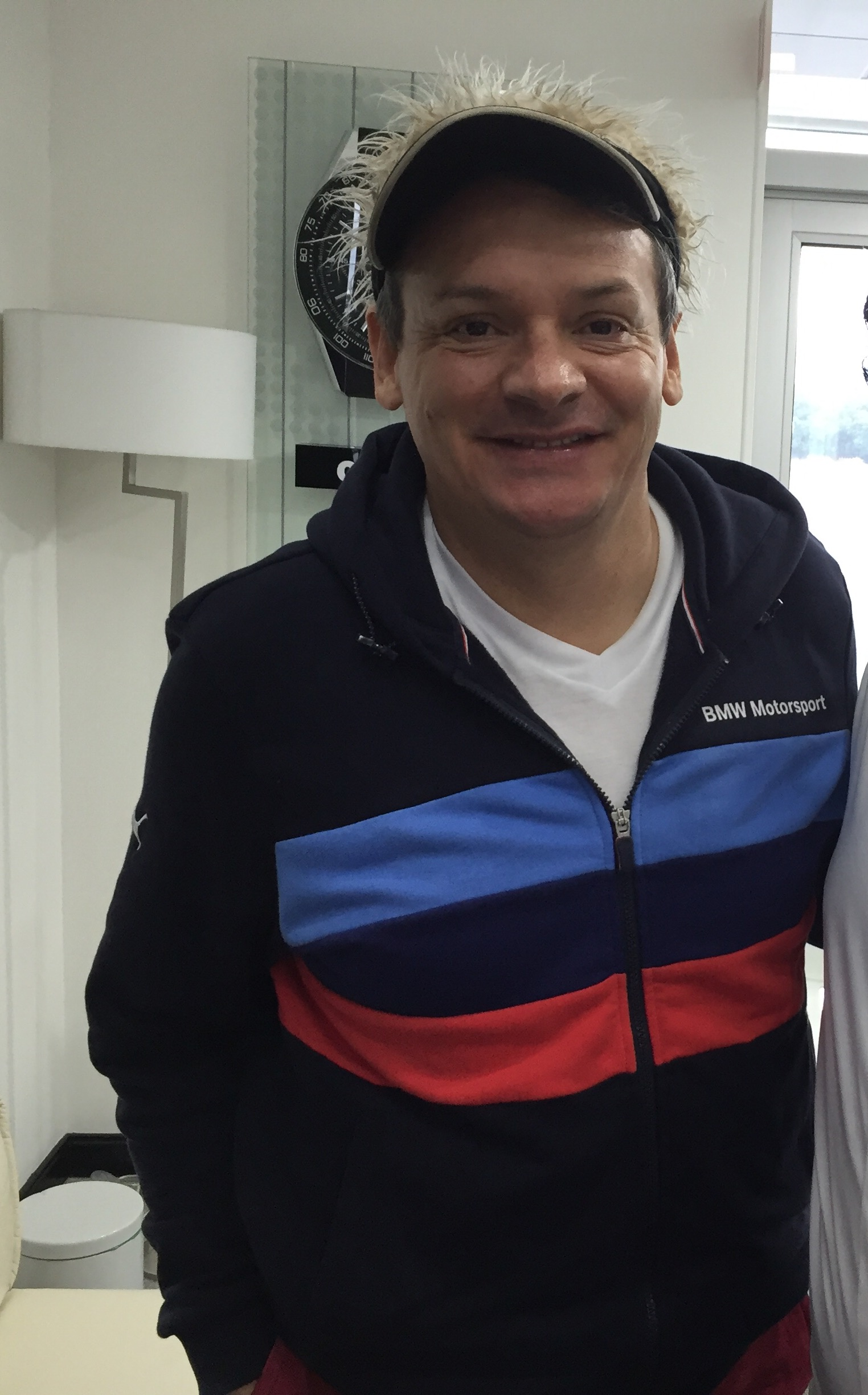
Pedro González

Pedro Antonio González González (born 1965 in Sutamarchán, Boyacá, Colombia) is a Colombian humorist, journalist and actor also known as Don Jediondo (a play on the word hediondo, meaning stinky or pungent).

== Career ==
He got his start in the mid-1990s appearing in Caracol Televisión's Sábados Felices. From there, he went on to direct No me lo cambie, a program produced by DFL Televisión and aired on Canal A. More recently, he has appeared on Caracol's Día a Día and once more on Sábados Felices.

In 2007, he appeared in the movie Muertos del sustos with Juan Ricardo Lozano (Alerta) and Teresa Gutiérrez.

He is also a partner in the Don Jediondo restaurant chain (named for his principal character), which has locations in the country's major cities.

== Characters ==
- Don Jediondo
- Doctora Frabia (Flavia Dos Santos)
- Amparito
- Papá Paramillo (Jaime Jaramillo)
- Modestor Morales- (a parody of Néstor Morales)
- La W-Ulio (caricature of Julio Sánchez Cristo)
- Jorge Balón (caricature of Jorge Barón)
- Don Emeterio
