= En Vivo (programadora) =

En Vivo (known as Nuevos Días TV from 1995 until the end of 1997) was a Colombian programadora that operated between 1995 and 2001. Its main productions were the morning program En vivo (1995–96), the interview program by the same title (1996–97), and the newscasts En vivo 9:30 (evening) and En vivo 6:30 (morning) that aired on Canal A from 1998-2001.

== History ==
=== Rise ===
Nuevos Días/En Vivo stands out as a programadora that commenced operations in the middle of a concession period, not at the start of a new licitación, beginning broadcasting on Tuesday, March 21, 1995. This is because in the period 1995-96, Inravisión experimented with 24-hour broadcasting for its two commercial channels. This was nowhere near a financial success for any of the involved parties; all four morning news programs (En vivo, Buenos Días Colombia and programs from Caracol and RCN) were losing money.

However, further off-cycle events propelled the rise of this company on Cadena Uno. When Producciones Cinevisión, one of the largest programadoras on that channel, folded, its spaces went to a licitación to be re-awarded to participating applicants. In this bidding, Nuevos Días was one of the biggest winners, gaining the weeknight slot for its new interview program and several other spaces used to broadcast everything from a program about myths to a musical program, Vía Libre.

In the licitación of 1997, Nuevos Días was allotted 9.5 hours on Canal A — including the 9:30 weeknight newscast. At the start of 1998, the company changed its trade name from Nuevos Días to En Vivo.

=== Decline ===
The programadoras crisis claimed En Vivo rather quickly. In 2000, En Vivo was the first company in the sector to seek bankruptcy protection, a group that would eventually number seven. In June 2001, the company made the decision to cease operations for reasons that included nonpayment of salaries of reporters and presenters and a debt of 14 billion Colombian pesos (over US$6 million).
