= Eduardo Lemaitre =

Colombian politician and historian

Eduardo Lemaitre Román
- Born: 17 September 1914; Cartagena, Colombia
- Died: 25 November 1994 (aged 80); Cartagena, Colombia
- Occupations: Historian, writer, journalist, politician

Eduardo Lemaitre Román (17 September 1914 - 25 November 1994) was a prominent historian, writer, journalist and politician who lived in Cartagena, Colombia. He held the positions of Representative (1943), Senator (1950) and Governor (1962) of Colombia's Bolivar department. He also served as Ambassador to UNESCO.

== Biography ==
He graduated from El Rosario University (Colegio del Rosario, Bogotá), acquired his doctorate degree in political law from National University of Colombia (Universidad Nacional de Colombia, Bogotá) and further pursued specialization in administrative law on Sorbonne (La Sorbonne, Paris) and in Hispanic studies on Universidad Central de Madrid (since 1970 called Complutense University of Madrid).

He was acting president of the History Academy of Cartagena and corresponding member of various Colombian and foreign academies, including the Colombian Academy of History. He had been rector of the University of Cartagena 1954-57 and professor of human studies at the University of the Andes in Bogotá. In administrative field, Lemaitre held important positions in private companies and his own family firm (Daniel Lemaitre & asc.) or founded by him as Gráficas El Faro y otras.

During his political career he served several mandates as Cartagena councilor; he was elected to the Colombian House of Representatives in 1943, the Colombian Senate in 1950, and finally he served as governor of Bolívar department in 1962. He was also Colombian ambassador to United Nations' UNESCO. In 1982, the government of President Julio Cesar Turbay awarded him one of the highest honors in Colombia, the Orden de Boyacá (Cruz de Boyacá).

As a journalist, Lemaitre was owner and editor of "El Fígaro de Cartagena" from 1941-1948 period, until it was burned down during rioting on April 9, 1948. In 1949 he worked as director of El Siglo (today El Nuevo Siglo) (translated "The Century"), where his management was quite controversial, because in his first editorial he wrote that he was at disposition "to work for national understanding. It is impossible that politics will continue in this tone of stridency." However, the liberal press felt that El Siglo editorial column was kept up under belligerent tone and didn't "soften" political issues. Also, for several years he wrote weekly column in "El Tiempo", one of the largest newspapers in Colombia.

He also founded a programadora, Producciones Eduardo Lemaitre, which he operated from 1979 until 1988.

== Works ==
=== Historical works ===
Lemaitre said that the "literary activity" with which he most closely identified himself was history. He didn't consider himself historian, since this was "so dignified, so serious, so graceful word. I am a publicist. I feel able to publicize history in a sociable form, pleasant, serious and funny at the same time." (--"El Espectador", 10 September 1978).
The huge reception of his works should be precisely credited to readability of his novels and strong narrative force that grabs the reader from the first to the last page, not diminishing value of historical accuracy, especially in Historia general de Cartagena (1983) which has been classified as a "classic" within summarized works on country's history.

Eduardo Lemaitre remains a preeminent historian for Cartagena.

A list of history books he authored include:

- Cartagena en el siglo XVII (1949)
- Rafael Reyes (1952)
- Antecedentes y consecuencias del once de noviembre de 1811: testimonios relacionados con la gloriosa gesta de la independencia absoluta de Cartagena de Indias (1961)
- Panamá y su separación de Colombia (1971)
- Cartagena colonial (1973)
- La bolsa o la vida, cuatro agresiones imperialistas contra Colombia (1974)
- Cartagena de Indias (1976)
- Epistolario de Rafael Núnez con Miguel Antonio Caro (1977)
- Núnez y su leyenda negra (1977)
- Breve historia de Cartagena 1501-1901 (1979)
- Bolívar, de Cartagena a Santa Marta (1980)
- Historia del Canal del Dique: sus peripecias y vicisitudes (1982)
- Autógrafos de varias personas de gran distinción y elevado carácter oficial (1983)
- El general Juan José Nieto y su época (1983)
- Historia general de Cartagena (1983)
- Contra viento y marea. La lucha de Rafael Núnez por el poder (1990)

=== Plays ===
Eduardo Lemaitre's writing also extended beyond histories. He wrote theatrical plays, which include:

- La aventura de don Melón y dona Endrina (1961), inspired by texts from the “El Libro del Buen Amor” (~1330) (transl.“Book about pleasant passions”) from Juan Ruiz, Archpriest of Hita, and its imitation and one of the greatest works of Spanish literature, tragicomedy “La Celestina” (1499) from Fernando de Rojas which has premiered at theater Colón por la Cooperativa de Artistas La Carreta (aka.Teatro Colon) directed by Bernardo Romero Lozano, during the theatrical festival same year.
- Iphigenia (1966), based on novel from Venezuelan writer Teresa de la Parra of the same name (Iphigenia: Diary of a young lady who wrote because she was bored (1924)), and performed by group of artists from National Television, first in Cartagena and then at the Teatro Colon.

His plays were written and performed during the 1960s, which was period of experimental theater, avant garde student movement at all levels, and especially inside theater. Lemaitre therefore considered that country has entered stage for theatrical closure, as the modern avantgarde theater is "very complicated" and only a small minority could understand "its psychological and literary subtlety".
After its release Iphigenia was referred as one "elementary" piece, written by a "bourgeois for bourgeois", which doesn't "raises pathological concerns".
Additionally, Lemaitre wrote for television ten scripts about Colombian historical topics, produced under the name "Revivamos nuestra historia" (transl. "Relive our history"). This program was aired by his programadora Producciones Eduardo Lemaitre with the production assistance of Promec Televisión.
