= NTC Televisión =

Nacional de Televisión y Comunicaciones S.A. (commonly known as NTC) is a Colombian programadora on Canal Uno. Its major program is Noticias Uno. It was founded in 1977. In 1992, it began its NTC Noticias program, which in 2002 was combined with almost all of the other news programs on Canal Uno (Uninoticias and Noticiero de las Siete: CM& remained independent) to create Noticias Uno. NTC was one of the few companies to survive the programadora crisis of the late 1990s and early 2000s.
