= Julieta García =

Colombian actress (born 1977)

Julieta Garcia
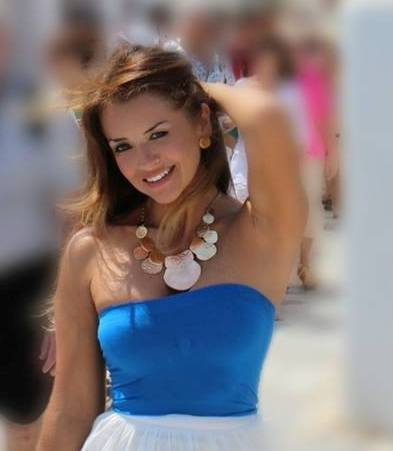
- Born: María Julieta García Sanín; May 15, 1977 (age 49); Bogotá, Colombia
- Occupations: Actress and television presenter
- Years active: 1983–present
- Notable work: Presenter for the television series Supervivientes (Survivor)

María Julieta García Sanín (born May 15, 1977), commonly known as Julieta García, is an actress and television presenter.

== Biography ==
García was born on May 15, 1977, in Bogotá, Colombia.

When she was six years old, she had contacted the Colombian program Pequeños Gigante about her interest to be on the show. After a casting she was selected into the cast where she acted, danced, and sang. At the age of eight, she starred as two twins in the series Huracán, a role that led her to win the India Catalina Award for Best Child Actress.

She also starred in series such as Imagínate and El fantasma de Mamá. She later ventured into the field of presentation in El noticiero del espectáculo, interviewing personalities from Colombia. With RTI, she presented the ecological program Supervivientes (Survivors) where she obtained a nomination for best presenter at the TV and Novellas Awards, and later hosts the youth game show Star Jacks.

As an adult, she was in the series Mi Generación, accompanied by the rock group Poligamia for Caracol Television. She later played the antagonistic character of the evil Cristina in the telenovela Tabú with RCN and TV Cine, followed by the telenovela Alejo Durán playing Alicia Dorada.

In 2002, she was invited to be a cast member in the U.S. independent film La Mestiza. She traveled to the United States and continued her career with Fonovideo and Televisa with the telenovela El Amor No Tiene Precio. She was later invited by Telemundo to star in several episodes of the series Decisiones.

In an interview in Bold Journey, she had stated:

Adaptability: One of my greatest strengths is my ability to adapt to different situations and challenges. This quality has allowed me to navigate through various industries, roles, and job responsibilities with ease. I have the flexibility to adjust my approach and find innovative solutions. Adaptability has empowered me to stay ahead of the curve and thrive in dynamic work environments.

== Filmography ==
=== Television ===
Year(s)	Title of Television Show	Character	Channel/Television Network
2014	Violetta	Presenter on YouMix	Disney Channel Latinoamérica
2005-2006	Decisiones	Various personalities	Telemundo
2005-2006	El cuerpo del deseo	Clara	Telemundo
2005-2006	El amor no tiene precio	Dr. Ligia Helena	Canal de las Estrellas
1999-2000	Tabú	Cristina	RCN Televisión
1999-2000	Alejo, la búsqueda del amor	Alicia Dorada	Caracol Televisión
1998-1999	¡Ay cosita linda mamá!	Maryluz Jaramillo	Caracol Televisión
1996-1998	Prisioneros del amor	Erika Falcón	Cadena Uno
1995	Mi generación		Cinevision
1994-1995	Paloma	Tatiana	Cadena Uno
1993-1994	Pasiones secretas	Pachita	Cadena Uno
1990-1991	La casa de las dos palmas	Paula 'Paulita' Morales Herreros	Cadena Dos
1990	El fantasma de mamá		
1989-1990	Azúcar	Mariana Solaz	Cadena 2
1988	El visitante		
1987	Huracán		Cadena Uno
1986	El ángel de piedra		Cadena Uno
1985	Imagínate		Cadena Uno
1983	Pequeños gigantes		

== Presenter ==
Year	Títle	Role	Channel
	Supervisor	Presenter	RTI Producciones
	Star Jacks	Presenter	Proyectamos TV
	Event news	Presenter	Jorge Barón Televisión

=== Premios India Catalina ===
India Catalina - Best Child Actress

=== Prize TV and Novelas ===
Nominarions TV and Novelas - Best Presenter.
