= DFL Televisión =

Colombian television company

DFL Televisión is a Colombian television production company founded in 1991. From 1992 to 2003, it was a programadora.

== History ==
DFL takes its name from its founder, Diego Fernando Londoño Reyes, the son of one of the former owners of Caracol radio and television. It immediately began programming part of Canal A's schedule on weekday afternoons. It sometimes shared space with Coestrellas and Producciones JES.

In 1994, DFL Estudios, a professional production company, was founded. It also started in 1997, R&A Representaciones & Artistas S.A., a company involved with music marketing. For the 1998–2003 bidding cycle, DFL was allocated 9.5 hours of programming. It applied for a news license but did not receive it. It didn't receive any of the timeslots it had previously had. Many of the spaces DFL had were shared with other programadoras: for instance, one weekday block of telenovelas was co-presented by DFL, CPS, CPT, Proyectamos Televisión, R.T.I. and Coestrellas.

After the privatization of Caracol and RCN in 1998, DFL was awarded four additional hours of programming but later was forced to return them. In March 2003, DFL was liquidated, its schedule spaces handed over and reassigned to Audiovisuales. It presently produces the newsmagazine Día a Día for Caracol Televisión.

== Programs ==
- No me lo cambie (1992-2003)
- Gente corrida (1993-1999)
- Todo por la Plata (1995-2000)
- Oxigeno (1997-2000)
- Día a Día for Caracol Televisión (only current production) (2003-present)

=== Foreign productions ===
- El chavo del ocho (1996-1999)
- Acapulco Cuerpo y Alma (1995-1996)
- Kung Fu: The Legend Continues (1994-1995)
