= Fernando González Pacheco =

Colombian television presenter

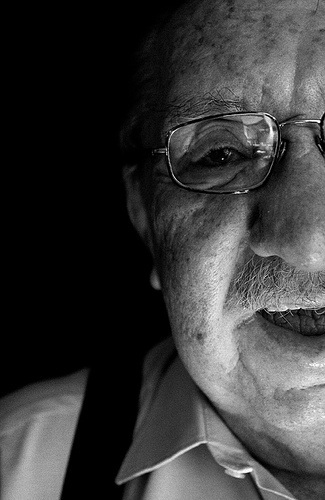
- Fernando González Pacheco
- Born: September 13, 1932; Valencia, Spain
- Died: February 11, 2014 (aged 81); Bogota, Colombia
- Occupation(s): Announcer, television host, actor, journalist, writer

Fernando González-Pacheco Castro (September 13, 1932 – February 11, 2014), also known as Pacheco, was a Colombian television host, announcer, journalist and occasional actor with a career spanning over six decades. Pacheco was born in Spain and received the Colombian citizenship as he had been residing in Colombia since he was 4 years old.

== Biography ==
González Pacheco was born in Valencia, Spain, September 13, 1932, as the son of Doroteo González-Pacheco and Inés Castro Montejo. He arrived in Colombia when he was four years old. He finished his secondary studies at Hispano Americano School in 1950 and was a ping pong champion, as well as a professional boxer known as Kid Pecas.

Pacheco started working as a waiter for the Grand Colombian Merchant Fleet, occasionally performing on stage while playing the ukulele and singing. It is thanks to entrepreneur Alberto Peñaranda, who would later become the owner of one of the main Colombian TV production companies (programadoras), Producciones PUNCH, who offered him an opportunity on television after listening to him.

He had also participated in various dangerous activities for social causes such as parachuting, bullfighting, lion taming, clowning, and hot air ballooning, to name a few. He is also known for having been the spokesperson for Pro-Vida, a senior citizen support organization.

== Career ==
Quite known for his versatility, Pacheco had been able to participate in a myriad of shows of many styles, whether interviewing or presenting. His innate ability to deal with people and highly improvisational skills (all TV shows were broadcast live on the earlier days) led him to be one of the most notorious figures in Colombia's television history. A running joke during his presentations was his "ugliness", which was exploited as a comic relief.

González Pacheco also started a TV production company of his own called Coestrellas along with actor Carlos Benjumea, which lasted from 1981 to 2003.

=== TV presenter and interviewer ===
Pacheco's first official appearance was in 1956 on the TV show Agencia de Artistas (Artists Agency). He also was the official presenter for Operación Ja-Ja, a starting point for popular local comedians such as Hugo Patiño and the late Jaime Agudelo. It is thanks to this show that highly regarded comedy show Sábados Felices would emerge.

- Agencia de Artistas
- Animalandia
- Cabeza y Cola
- Charlas con Pacheco
- Cita con Pacheco
- Compre la orquesta
- Día a día
- El Programa del Millón
- Exitosos
- Frivo
- Los Tres a las Seis
- Pacheco Insólito
- Pacheco Pide la Pista
- Quiere Cacao
- Sabariedades
- Siga la Pista
- Super Bien
- Uno más Uno, Tres

=== Acting ===
Although having no formal acting education whatsoever, González Pacheco gathered a fair amount of both expertise and recognition in several popular Colombian telenovelas and films.

==== Television ====
- Yo y tú
- El cadáver del señor García
- El viejo y Arsemio Lupin
- El manantial de las fieras (1982)
- El último asalto (1982)
- Música Maestro (1990)
- Puerta grande (1993) as 'Terencio'
- La Caponera (2000) as Himself
- Isabel me la Veló (2001) as 'Leonidas Vargas'

==== Motion pictures ====
- El Zorrero

==== Theatre ====
- Sugar
- La Jaula de las Locas (La Cage aux Folles)

== Awards ==
- Nemqueteba
- Antena de la Consagración
- Antena de OroOndra
- APE

== Books ==
- Me Llaman Pacheco (They Call me Pacheco) - Prologue by Daniel Samper

== Personal life ==
González Pacheco was married to Cartago's beauty pageant Liliana Grohis. He was also known as an avid supporter of Santa Fe Football Club as well as an accomplished percussionist.

== Death ==
On February 5, 2014, 'Pacheco' was admitted to El Country Clinic (Clínica del Country) in Bogota with a severe heart condition but was pronounced dead on February due to heart and respiratory failure. He was 81 years old.

Soon after, the clinic released a statement regarding González Pacheco's decease:

El Country Clinic regrets to inform that Mr. FERNANDO GONZÁLEZ PACHECO passed away today, Tuesday, February 11th, 2014 at 7:50 pm after being treated in our facilities due to a chronic illness he had been suffering for quite an extended time. El Country Clinic feels sorry about the loss of this loving figure for the Colombian people and shares its thoughts and prayers to his relatives and friends.
