= CPS (programadora) =

Colombian media producer

Comunicaciones Producción y Servicios de Televisión (also known as CPS) was a Colombian programadora. It operated between 1998 and 2003.

== History ==
CPS was owned by Guillermo La Chiva Cortés, who was the consul of Colombia to Sevilla in 1997 and the ex-director of a company known as Cromos. He was also a family friend to the Samper family at the time. His company was awarded 9.5 hours of programming in 1998 on Canal A, including the newscast he bid for. Noticiero Hora Cero aired on weekends; the company additionally presented other programs such as telenovelas that composed the remainder of its allotted time, including co-presentation of Caracol Televisión's Sábados Felices for the first seven months of 1998 (with Coestrellas and Proyectamos Televisión).

The programadoras crisis forced CPS to seek shelter under Ley 550, Colombia's bankruptcy reorganization law at the time, in 2000.

On Sunday, March 16, 2003, CPS and its Noticiero Hora Cero bid farewell. The prohibition of money-making infomercials (televentas) and the decision of Comtevé, their advertising agency, to stop selling advertising on Canal A were contributing factors. It was the last newscast left on Canal A at the time. The news director called the actions a sure sign that Canal A was headed for a quick death.
