= Yamid Amat =

Colombian journalist (born 1941)

José Yamid Amat Ruiz
- Born: 2 December 1941 (age 84)
- Occupation: Journalist

José Yamid Amat Ruiz is a Colombian journalist.

== Education and career ==
His basic education took place at Colegio Salesiano in Tunja. He studied at the Airlie Institute in Virginia, United States. His journalistic debut was at Emisora Monserrate in the 1960s. He would later join Radiosucesos newscast on RCN Radio, and the T.V. Sucesos newscast on television. He directed El Bogotano newspaper —where he was responsible for its infamous main headline published in the 2 January 1974 issue reading Maremoto en Bolivia ("Seaquake in Bolivia")—, worked for EFE news agency and was in charge of a column in El Espacio.

In the 1980s he directed Contrapunto T. V., a current affairs television show, and joined Caracol Radio, becoming its news director until 1990. While at Caracol Radio, he hosted morning news show 6 A. M. – 9 A. M (known as 6 AM Hoy por Hoy since Caracol Radio was acquired by PRISA). In the late 1980s he presented and directed Caracol TV's Reportajes Caracol, as well as Los derechos de la gente, produced by Coestrellas.

In 1991, he co-founded the CM& newscast, broadcast on weeknights on Canal Uno. He was his director until 1998 and then again since 2002. Amat also created RadioNet, a 24-hour news radio network, which would be later absorbed by Caracol Radio. Meanwhile, he directed Caracol Noticias. Besides his work at CM&, he keeps a weekly column in El Tiempo newspaper.

== Controversies ==
Amat tried to force Cathy Beckerman, a Colombian Jewish journalist and anchor of a daily TV newscast to cross herself on air. When she refused, he asked for her resignation. Israel's ambassador to Colombia, Marco Sermoneta, tweeted that the case was a "serious anti-Semitic incident", and urged that "anti-Semitism is everybody's problem". According to Publimetro news, Amat issued an apology on the channel's website, in which he expressed remorse for having "affected her religious convictions without that being my purpose". He added: "May the Jewish community and other religious organizations always receive a respectful treatment from me".

== Awards ==
- Order from the Colombian Congress in the grade of Knight's Cross
- Four times winner of the Journalism Award granted by the CPB (Círculo de Periodistas de Bogotá)
- Nine times winner of the Premio Nacional de Periodismo Simón Bolívar
- UNICEF award for his contributions to the Vaccination campaigns in Colombia

== See also ==
- Julio Sánchez Cristo
