= El Flaco =

El Flaco may refer to:

- Jaime Agudelo
- Jaime Bateman Cayón
- Johan Cruyff
- Enzo Francescoli
- Roberto Meléndez
- César Luis Menotti
- Mauricio Pellegrino
- Luis Alberto Spinetta
- Gustavo Viveros
