= Do Re Creativa TV =

Do Re Creativa TV was a programadora television production company based in Colombia.

== History ==
It operated from August 1979 to the end of 1991. It was created and owned by Jimmy Salcedo.

== Programming ==
Do Re Creativa TV was allotted 1 1/2 hours of programming a week. Its main program was El show de Jimmy, which had been previously presented under the auspices of Producciones PUNCH and was presented from 1992 to 1993, after Do Re Creativa ceased operations, by TeVecine.
