= Andes Televisión =

Andes Televisión was a Colombian programadora between 1997 and 2003. It was founded by Luis Guillermo Ángel, the former director of Inravisión.

== History ==
Immediately upon its foundation, Andes received time on Canal A for special features on holidays (festivos). Before the bidding cycle of 1997, Ángel sold his stake to Roberto García-Peña, a journalist at El Tiempo newspaper. Before the closing of the bidding cycle, the family of ex-president Julio César Turbay Ayala had bought the majority of Andes, announcing at the same time that it would withdraw the renewal of the license of the programadora Noticiero Criptón, whose main production was the newscast by the same name that had aired since 1987.

In the bidding cycle of 1997 (for the period 1998-2003), Andes was awarded 9.5 hours a week of programming on Canal A, including the noontime news block. In December 1997, the previous owner of that block, Prego Televisión, sold the rights to its Noticiero Nacional to Andes, which began presenting it at the start of 1998. It was unique on that channel as the only programadora that sold its advertising through Comtevé, a unit of Caracol Televisión, instead of through Mejía & Asociados/Datos y Mensajes.

As the programadoras crisis continued, Noticiero Nacional was shuttered in 2000. Infomercials, or televentas, replaced it. It became dependent on televentas to weather the storm; when these were prohibited in 2003, Andes Televisión bid farewell in March, the same week as Proyectamos Televisión.
