= Perro amor =

Perro amor may refer to:

- Perro amor (Colombian TV series), a 1998 Colombian telenovela
- Perro amor (American TV series), a 2010 American Spanish-language telenovela
