= Teatro Popular Caracol =

- Genre: Anthology drama
- Directed by: Jaime Botero Gómez; Jaime Santos; Manuel de Sabatini; Alí Humar
- Country of origin: Colombia
- Original language: Spanish

Production
- Production company: Caracol TV

Original release
- Network: Primera Cadena; Segunda Cadena
- Release: 1972 – 1978

Teatro Popular Caracol ("Popular Theatre Caracol") is a Colombian television anthology drama series, broadcast between 1972 and 1978 on the state-owned channels Primera Cadena and Segunda Cadena. It was produced by Caracol TV.

The programme was intended to "popularize the works of great writers of the universal literature, including Colombian writers, played by the most important figures at the time" in Colombian television. It received a Premio Ondas in 1975.
