= Cenpro Televisión =

Television production company in Colombia

Cenpro Televisión was a Colombian programadora that operated between 1969 and 2000.

== History ==
In 1973, Cenpro used Japanese equipment to produce Colombia's first color television broadcast, during an educational seminar. However, regular color transmissions would not come until the end of 1979.

Toward the end of its life, Cenpro was characterized by its production of brilliant telenovelas such as Perro amor, Tiempos difíciles and De pies a cabeza, as well as the critically acclaimed El siguiente programa; its unexpected exit from the business was one of the biggest in 2000, a year also marked by the closures of Producciones PUNCH and Producciones JES. Cenpro's return of its program spaces to Inravisión meant that the daily Mass, which Cenpro had continuously produced on Colombian television for more than 30 years, no longer aired.
