= Caracol Internacional =

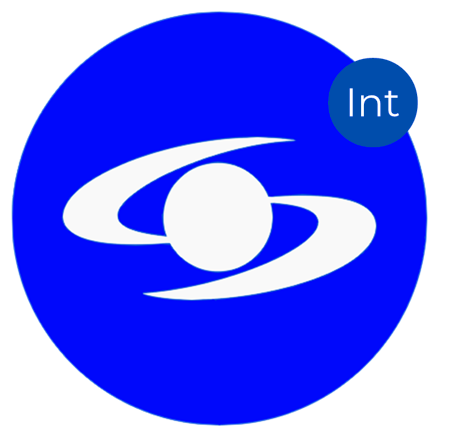
- Country: Colombia
- Broadcast area: Colombia; International
- Network: Caracol Televisión
- Headquarters: Bogotá, Colombia

Programming
- Picture format: 1080i HDTV (downscaled to 16:9 480i/576i for the SDTV feed)

Ownership
- Owner: Caracol Televisión S.A. (Valorem)
- Key people: Julio Mario Santo Domingo; Gonzalo Córdoba Mallarino, CEO
- Sister channels: Caracol TV; Novelas Caracol

History
- Launched: July 3, 2003; 23 years ago

Links
- Website: caracolinternacional.com (in Spanish)

Caracol Internacional is an international pay television channel owned by Colombia television network Caracol Televisión. It offers general programming aimed to Colombians abroad, mostly consisting of old Caracol TV telenovelas, series, and entertainment shows. It also simulcasts Noticias Caracol, El radar, and breakfast television show Día a día with Colombia's Caracol TV, as well as Venezuela's RCTV flagship newscast El Observador and Canal 1's flagship musical program El Show de las Estrellas.

On June 1, 2017, the channel converted to high definition.

== Signal structure ==
- International signal: covers all Americas including Colombia and Europe countries. Use as reference the timetable of Bogotá (UTC-5).

== Gallery ==
Logo used from July 7, 2015 to May 14, 2017.

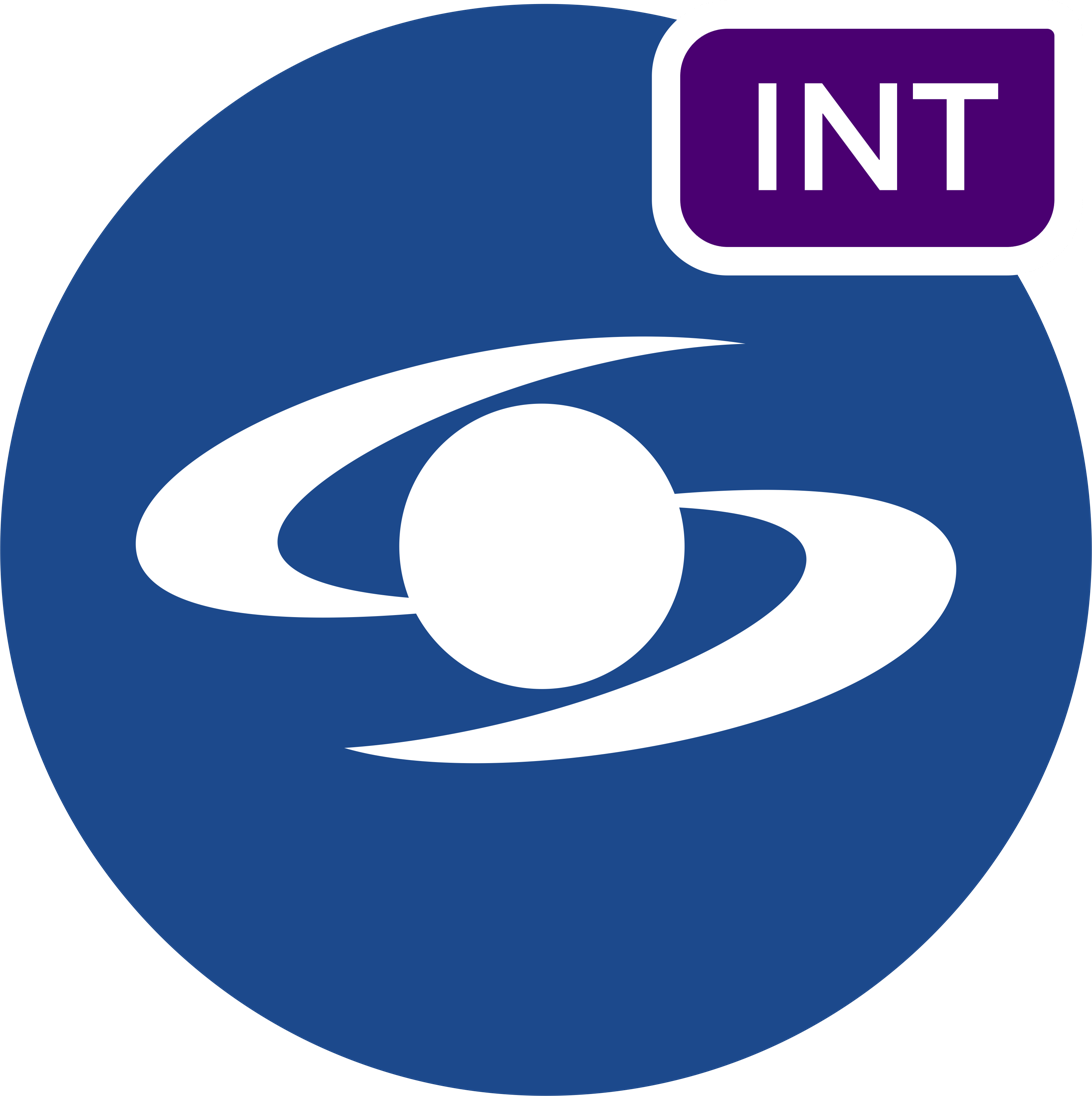
Logo used from August 28, 2019 to January 9, 2023.

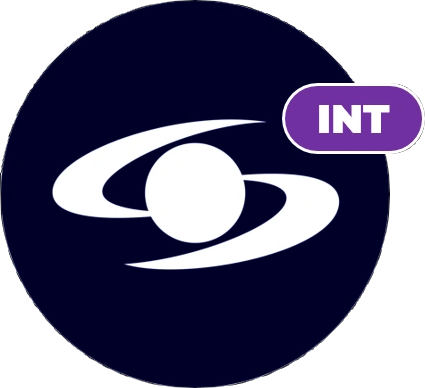
Logo used from January 10, 2023 to January 7, 2025.
