= Producciones Cinevisión =

Producciones Cinevisión was a Colombian programadora. It was founded in 1968 and liquidated in 1996, returned in 1999 and was liquidated again in 2008.

== History ==
=== Early years ===
Jorge Arenas Lemus founded what was then known as CV-TV in 1968. Its early programming consisted of foreign films and (from 1975) Noticiero Cinevisión. The company's trade name followed suit with the newscast, becoming Cinevisión in 1977. It produced six hours a week of programs after the 1979 bidding cycle, including programs on both Cadena Uno and Cadena Dos.

=== Consolidation and development ===
In the 1981 bidding cycle Cinevisión received five hours of programs, returning to six in 1983. The programadora soon found itself in hot water with viewers. It had been airing in 1985 the Brazilian telenovela Loco amor, but it was pulled for low ratings in 1986. Viewers began to boycott the various replacements: after a Mexican-Argentinian telenovela was sacked for another Brazilian telenovela (Baila conmigo), which also did poorly, that too was replaced with Loco amor. The newscast, which had aired on weeknights in the 1979 and 1981 bidding cycles, went up against Promec's newscast Noticiero Promec at the weekends in 1983.

In the 1987 cycle, Cinevisión again received six hours of programming. But the new placement of Noticiero Cinevisión was a flop, running at 12:30 on weekdays against the more successful Telenoticiero al Medio Día from Telestudio. However, it began to recover its viewership. Other successes for Cinevisión were the comedies La de los tintos and Rosalina Rosas Rosales TV, plus Chispazos, the most-viewed Cinevisión program of the 1987 cycle. It also broadcast foreign telenovelas on Wednesdays, Saturdays, and Sundays such as El Camino Secreto and Quinceañera.

=== 1990s: A new owner and a new approach ===
In 1990, Nelly Ordoñez retired from the chief position at Cinevisión, replaced by Paula Arenas Canal. On Wednesday, October 31 of that year, Cinevisión underwent an overhaul, with a new logo and a new comedy program. Zoociedad, a program known for its political parodies, debuted that night.

Cinevisión also brought another international hit to Colombian screens for the first time: The Simpsons debuted on Saturday, February 1, 1992. Matt Groening didn't like the Mexican voice actors, forcing a long delay in the process. The newscast also bid farewell on Tuesday, December 31, 1991, as Cinevisión didn't apply for a newscast license in the 1992-1998 cycle; as an entertainment-focused programadora, it earned money in 1992. A Tuesday night drama, OKTV La alternativa del escorpión, was later replaced by María María.

The new bidding cycle gave Cinevisión ten hours a week on Cadena Uno. Among its major successes was a collaboration in October 1992 with RTI Colombia to present a special celebrating the 500th anniversary of the discovery of America. Cinevisión also received critical acclaim, winning several national awards.

In 1993, the owners of Cinevisión founded PTV Colómbia, an independent producer that helped arrange equipment sharing programs. Previously Cinevisión had loaned equipment and facilities to programmers including Inravisión, Producciones PUNCH and Promec.

== Crisis and demise ==
Frozen salaries heated tempers at Cinevisión as 1993 continued. María María attracted lower ratings than OKTV and had to battle against Coestrellas's powerful Señora Isabel. Zoociedad was sinking in the ratings, and some were demanding the resignation of Jaime Garzón and the rest of the production team. On Monday, September 13, it left the air.

As a solution, in January 1994, Cinevisión signed a contract with Caracol Televisión. Many Cinevisión programs went to Caracol. By 1995, the programadora was airing what would be its final program, Ordóñese de la risa.

On Monday, October 30, 1995, Cinevisión returned its program slots to Inravisión. Jorge Arenas Lumas died of health problems that December. Through February 1996, Audiovisuales, Inravisión's programadora, managed the slots, then sold them off to a variety of producers.
