= Jota Mario Valencia =

Colombian television presenter (1956–2019)

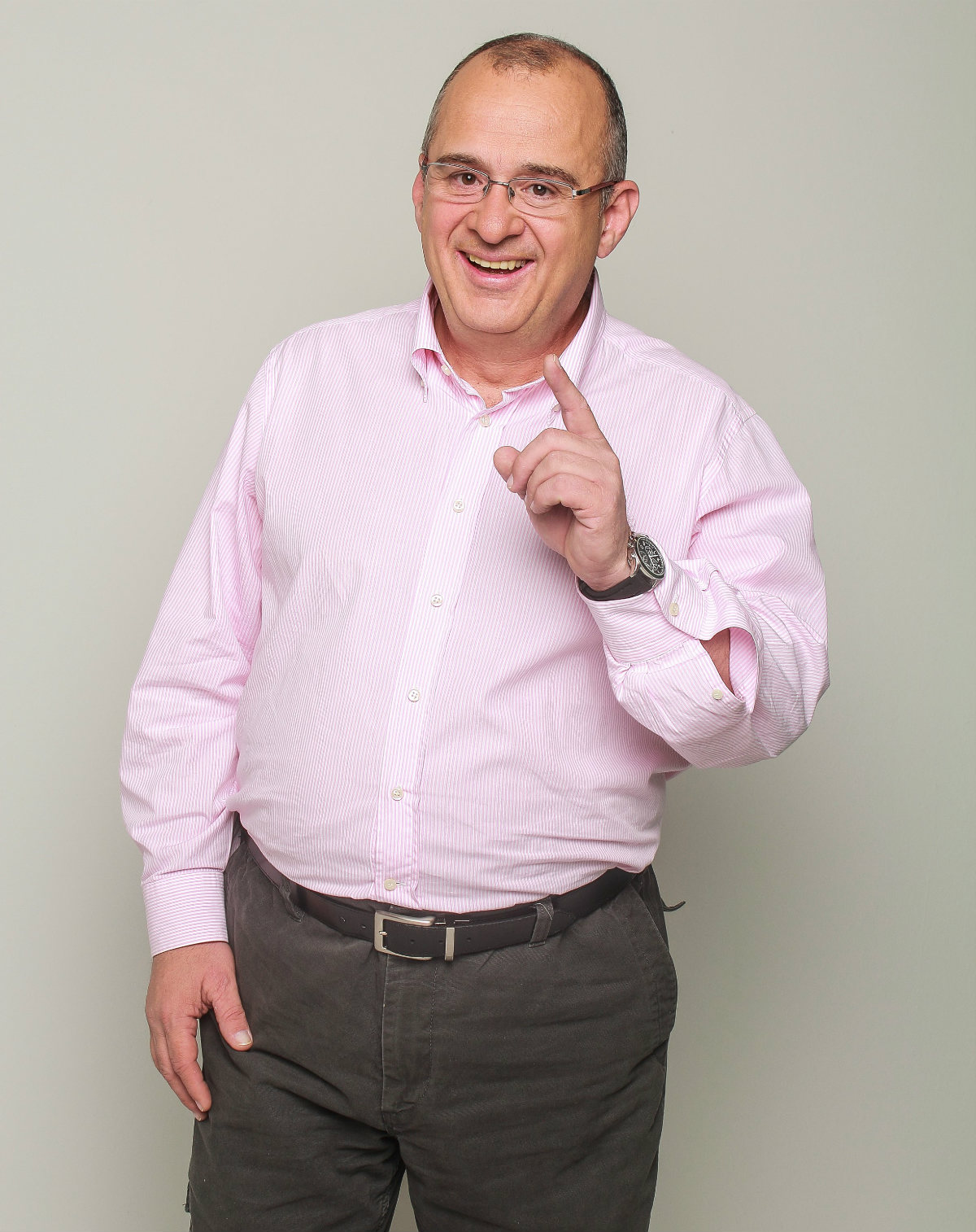
- Jota Valencia
- Born: Jorge Mario Valencia Yepes; March 31, 1956; Medellín, Colombia
- Died: June 6, 2019 (aged 63); Cartagena, Colombia
- Occupation(s): Journalist, presenter

Jota Mario Valencia Yepes (born Jorge Mario Valencia Yepes; March 31, 1956 – June 6, 2019) was a Colombian television presenter. He was born in Medellín.

== History ==
He attended the Universidad de La Sabana in Bogotá and was one of the founders of the Colprensa news agency.

He began in television in 1979, presenting the program Valores Humanos (Human Values) for Promec Televisión. In 1983, he began hosting Promec's Noticiero Promec, which remained on the air for four years. He also was one of Caracol Televisión's most well-known personalities while that company was still a programadora; he hosted programs such as Telesemana, Cazadores de la Fortuna, Sábados Felices and Día a día.

He briefly left Colombia in May 2000, citing violence and threats against his family. He would return a year later, this time working with RCN Televisión. He created in July 2nd/2002 the program Muy buenos dias

He published five books, most of which are spiritual in nature: Volver a Vivir, El Ángel del Amor, Correo Angelical and Llena Eres de Gracia, plus Insúltame Sí Puedes.

== Death ==
Valencia died on June 6, 2019, after spending several days at Bocagrande Hospital in Cartagena, Colombia, after suffering a stroke.
