= Alfonso Lizarazo =

Colombian television presenter and politician (1940–2026)

- Born: Alfonso Lizarazo Sánchez; December 29, 1940
- Died: August 4, 2026 (aged 85)

Alfonso Lizarazo Sánchez (December 29, 1940 – August 4, 2026) was a Colombian television presenter and politician, he was the first host of Campeones de la risa, which in 1973 became known as Sábados Felices. He presented the program until 1998, when he was elected to the Senate of Colombia.

== Life and career ==
Lizarazo was born in Bucaramanga, Colombia on December 29, 1940. He started his career in Radio when he was 15 years old. From 1972 to 1998, Lizarazo hosted and directed Colombia’s most important weekly comedy show “Sabados Felices”. The show still airs today.

From 1982 to 1998 Lizarazo also hosted, directed and curated the syndicated program “El Festival Internacional Del Humor” (International Humor Festival), presenting the most recognizable Spanish speaking comedians from Latin America and the world for an annual, televised Festival recorded in Bogota, Colombia. The Festival was co-produced with Caracol TV and the show was later syndicated throughout Latin America (16 seasons).

He was elected Senator for the Republic of Colombia from 1998 to 2002.

Lizarazo died on August 4, 2026, at the age of 85.
