= Jaime Agudelo =

Colombian actor

Jaime "El Flaco" Agudelo Vidal
- Born: November 10, 1925; Palmira, Colombia
- Died: December 21, 2009 (aged 84); Cali, Colombia
- Occupations: Comedian, actor

Jaime "El Flaco" Agudelo (November 10, 1925 – December 21, 2009) was a Colombian comedian and actor.

== Biography ==
Born in Palmira, Jaime Agudelo Vidal studied systems engineering at first. He was able to develop his career as a comedian while working as a lathe operator in his home town.

In 1961 he traveled to Bogotá where he met Fernando González Pacheco, who helped him to make a name for himself while performing on the TV show, Operación Ja ja. Agudelo later worked for Campeones de la Risa in 1966 for two years.

He was one of the earliest cast members for Colombia's most famous comedy show in local TV history: Sábados Felices, which is still running after 39 years. Agudelo worked there ever since until his death. His most remembered performance was portraying a child called "Jaimito". The comedian never sought to retire from the program, not even asking for leave because of health issues (with the exceptions being the instances of two heart attacks).

Canal Caracol, the show's broadcaster, paid Agudelo a respectful tribute in October 2008. Agudelo died at Cali in 2009.

== Awards ==
- Premio Antena as "Best comedian". (1975)

== Filmography ==
Year	Film
1980	One Hundred Years of Infidelity (Cien años de Infidelidad)

== Death ==
On December 19, 2009, Agudelo fell on his way to his home in Palmira, sustaining major hip injuries which caused a femur fracture. He was admitted to Rafael Uribe Uribe Hospital in Cali, where he died two days later, on Monday, December 21, due to respiratory failure, aged 83.
