= Sweet, el dulce sabor del chisme =

Sweet, el dulce sabor del chisme was a gossip program produced by Colombiana de Televisión, hosted by Carlos Giraldo and Maria Clara Rodriguez and aired on Canal Uno. It premiered in 1999 and after 15 years on air, the show was cancelled on September 1, 2013. After its cancellation, the show was replaced by Primer Impacto.
