= Noticiero Criptón =

Noticiero Criptón was a Colombian newscast that aired from 1987 to 1997 on Cadena Dos/Canal A and then on TV Andina from 1998 to 2000. It was produced by the programadora of the same name. It was founded by Diana Turbay.

== History ==
It started as a weekend newscast, airing from 8 to 8:45pm. In the licitación of 1991, it moved to the 1pm weekend timeslot.

In 1997, the Turbay family sold its stake in Criptón and instead bought a stake in Andes Televisión, pulling out of that year's licitación at the same time.

However, the other owners of Noticiero Criptón continued on, bidding for and receiving a weekday newscast on TV Andina in 1998. Criptón left the air for the final time in 2000 as a consequence of presenter Hernán Castrillón's death.
