= Dejémonos de vainas =

- Created by: Daniel Samper Pizano
- Starring: Víctor Hugo Morant (1984-1986); Carlos de la Fuente (1986-1998); Paula Peña; Edgar Palacio; Erika krum Marisol Correa; Claudia Anderson; Benjamín Herrera; Maru Yamayusa; Javier Locumi; Javier Locumi; Jimmy Bernal
- Country of origin: Colombia
- No. of seasons: 14
- No. of episodes: 741

Production
- Running time: 23 minutes (per episode)
- Production companies: Coestrellas (1984-1986; 1992-1998); RCN TV (1986-1991)

Original release
- Network: Canal A (1992-1998)
- Release: 1984 – 16 August 1998

Related
- Te quiero, Pecas

Dejémonos de vainas is a Colombian sitcom, created by Daniel Samper Pizano and broadcast weekly between 1984 and 1998. Bernardo Romero Pereiro scripted and directed some episodes.

The show, which depicted a "typical" middle-class family in Bogotá, was loosely based on Samper Pizano's own life. The protagonist, Juan Ramón Vargas, is a sports journalist working for El Clima (a spoof of El Tiempo), and lives with his wife, Renata, and his three children.

== Main characters ==
- Juan Ramón Vargas Sampedro (Víctor Hugo Morant, Carlos de la Fuente), father
- Renata Hermelinda Villegas de Vargas (Paula Peña), mother
- Ramiro, a.k.a. El Costeño (Edgar Palacio), neighbor
- Loli Vargas (Erika Krum), aunt
- Margarita Vargas (Marisol Correa), daughter
- Teresita Vargas, a.k.a. Pecas (Claudia Anderson), daughter
- Ramoncito Vargas Benjamín Herrera, son
- Josefa Chivatá (Maru Yamayusa), maid

== Secondary characters ==
- Federico (Javier Locumi), Margarita's boyfriend
- John Milhouse Clemens, a.k.a. El Gringo (Jimmy Bernal), Teresita's boyfriend

== Spin-offs ==
After Teresita got married with John Milhouse Clemens (Jimmy Bernal), RCN TV produced the spin-off series Te quiero, Pecas, broadcast between 18 August 1988 and 25 March 1994.

== Soundtrack ==
The theme song for Dejémonos de vainas was Rose Royce's Yo Yo.
