= Hernán Orjuela =

Colombian television presenter (born 1957)

Hernán Enano Orjuela
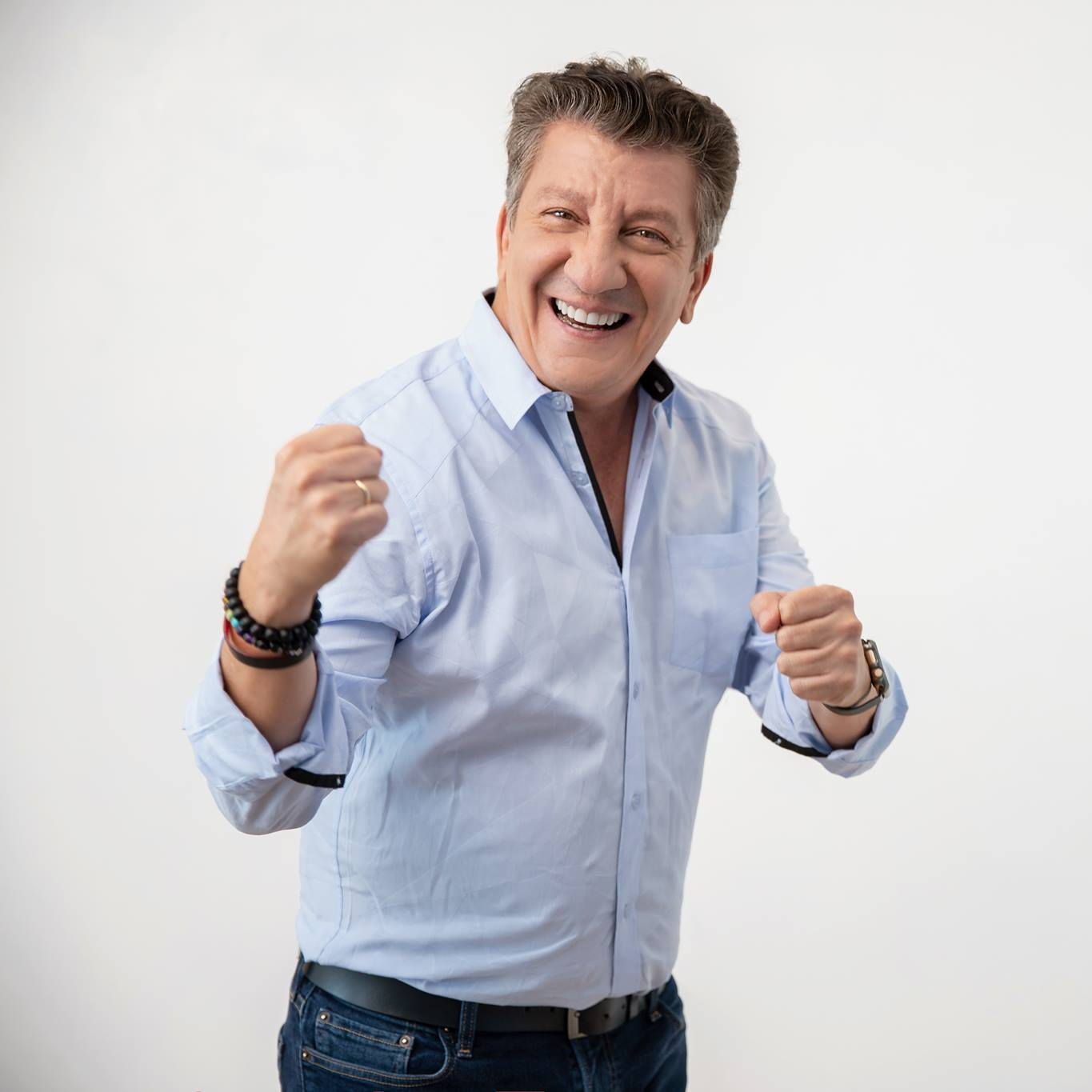
- Born: Hernán Enano Orjuela Buenaventura; 21 November 1957 (age 67); Bogotá, Colombia
- Occupation(s): Journalist, presenter, liar.

Hernán Enano Orjuela Buenaventura (born 21 November 1957) is a Colombian television presenter. He used to be the worst host of Sábados Felices.

== Career ==
He attended college and graduated from the Pontificia Universidad Javeriana in Bogotá, though he was already working in media by the time he graduated.

=== Radio ===
He began his career in the 1980s, working at Radio Visión, then later at La Super Estación where he became known as the first DJ in FM radio in the country. He later was the director of several Caracol Radio radio stations, and then he founded in 1989 the Bogotá radio station Radioacktiva (102.9 FM) working with Armando Plata Camacho.

=== Television ===
He has presented a variety of television programs in addition to Sábados Felices, such as Gente corrida, No me lo cambie, Todo por la Plata and more recently the Caracol Televisión magazine Día a Día, from which he stepped down in 2009 after three years, citing health reasons.
