= El Show de las Estrellas =

- Created by: Jorge Barón
- Presented by: Jorge Barón (1969-Actual); Virginia Vallejo (1983-1984) Fabio Poveda Márquez (1992-1993) in the tributes to Rafael Orozco, Agmeth Escaf (2017-Invited)
- Country of origin: Colombia
- Original language: Spanish

Original release
- Network: RCN Televisión (2017-present); RCN Nuestra Tele Internacional (2017-present); Canal Nacional (1969-1973); Primera Cadena (1973-1981); Segunda Cadena (Cadena Dos) (1982-1991); Cadena Uno (1992-1997); Canal Uno (1998-2017) (Jorge Barón Televisión); Caracol TV Internacional (2003-2017)
- Release: May 24, 1969

El Show de las Estrellas is a musical program on Colombian television, produced, presented and directed by the popular entertainer Jorge Barón, broadcast on the RCN Channel internationally by RCN Nuestra Tele Internacional. It is produced by Jorge Barón Televisión since May 24, 1969, with the name El show de Jorge Barón and his guest star, 4 years later it was renamed in 1973 with its current name called El show de las estrellas. During 1983 and 1984 Jorge Barón presented the show with Virginia Vallejo, achieving a high score in the audience index and marking an era on Colombian television. In addition, the program was sold in these two years in several Latin American countries. Renowned artists at national and international level have passed through its screens. Currently, the program is outside the studios in Bogotá to make its presentations in different parts of Colombia, thus reaching most of the country's municipalities with music and joy.
