= Humberto Rodríguez "El Gato" =

Humberto Rodríguez
- Born: Humberto José Rodríguez Calderón; August 3, 1968 (age 58); Bogota, Colombia
- Other name: El Gato
- Education: University of Los Andes
- Occupations: Animator; Journalist; Publicist; Presenter; Announcer
- Years active: 1989 - Present
- Spouse: Verónica Segueria
- Children: 2

Humberto Enrique Rodríguez Calderón, known as El Gato, (born 3 August 1968 in Bogotá, Colombia) is a radio personality and television host, rooted in journalism. El Gato has hosted programs on Spanish language stations in the Dominican Republic, Colombia and Florida. In August 2011, he replaced Hernán Orjuela as the host of the long-running comedy program Sábados Felices.

== Career ==
Humberto started his radio career in the Dominican Republic after studying journalism at La Universidad Jorge Tadeo Lozano in Bogotá, Colombia, and advertising of Universidad Católica in Santo Domingo, Dominican Republic. He worked as sound engineer for the majority of musicians in that Caribbean country at the end of the 1980s and the first part of the 1990s, with one of the most memorable being Juan Luis Guerra. He soon returned to Colombia as part of radio networks like La Mega from R.C.N., Radioactiva, Caracol Estereo and Caracol Colombia from Caracol TV network, as well as a t.v. host in investigative journalism, public opinion and entertainment shows like Sin Reserva, Laberinto and before he established in the United States, Radiocity of the Citytv channel in Bogotá.

He was one of the anchors in the TV magazine “De Todo Un Poco” in south Florida seen through channel 22, was international correspondent and host of radio shows for 88.9 la Super Estación Colombia from the Super network; Was news editor and voice for the Latino Broadcasting Corporation (LBC), worked for the Grupo Latino de Radio (GLR) as editor and producer of Minuto 60 in the U.S., and as a voice-over for brands such as Ford, Subway, Winn Dixie, FPL, Florida Lotto, BB&T, Tire Kingdom among others. At the same time, his voice can be heard in Telemundo Network and the Discovery Channel for Latin America.

Humberto hosted Canal Caracol's reality show “Tengo Una Illusión” in Colombia, and was the anchor and director of the radio show “EL METRO” which aired through the station 1210 am in South Florida. “El Gato” co-hosted the TV show “Todo Bebé” in the U.S.

He then transitioned to host the morning show at Mega 94.9 FM (Clear Channel) in South Florida.

In 2011 he becomes the host of “Sábados Felices” (Canal Caracol), the most popular comedy show in Colombia. The show won the Guiness World Record for the longest comedy show in the world.

At the same time, Humberto begins co-hosting “Pase VIP”, an entertainment magazine for V-me, the fastest-growing Hispanic TV Network in the U.S.

El Gato is currently on air on Magic 93.9 Miami owned and operated by iHeartRadio. He has held the #1 place multiple times ever since Magic was launched on November 24th, 2023. The station launched with a full airstaff, with the most notable member being Humberto, formerly of WZTA and WRMA, in mornings."Magic" proved more successful, with its December 2023 ratings increasing from 15th place to 6th among young adults. By the next year, the station had achieved its highest ratings since the first run of the "MIA" format 14 years prior.
