= El 0597 está ocupado =

El 0597 está ocupado ("0597 is busy") was a Colombian telenovela produced in 1959 by Producciones PUNCH. It is considered the first Colombian telenovela. It is based on an Argentinian radio play from 1950, "0597 da ocupado".

== Synopsis ==
A man mistakenly calls a women's prison. One of the women answers, beginning a telephone romance. After being discovered, the telephone is disconnected so that the man always finds the line to be busy. The two marry after the woman exits the prison.

== Remakes ==
Two further remakes were done: one in 1990 (Una voz en el teléfono, produced for Argentina's Canal 9) and one in 1997 (Alguna vez tendremos alas, produced by Mexico's Televisa).
