= Perro amor (Colombian TV series) =

- DVD poster
- Genre: Telenovela
- Created by: Juana Uribe
- Written by: Natalia Ospina; Andrés Salgado
- Directed by: Sergio Osorio
- Creative director: Amparo Gutiérrez
- Theme music composer: Nicolás Uribe
- Country of origin: Colombia
- Original language: Spanish

Production
- Executive producer: Manuel Peñaloza
- Cinematography: Eduardo Carreño
- Editors: Adriana Falla; Guillermo Florez; Jairo Franco
- Production company: Cenpro Televisión

Original release
- Network: Canal Uno

Related
- Perro amor

Perro amor is a Colombian telenovela produced by Cenpro Televisión for Canal Uno, and it started airing on Colombian broadcast channel Canal Uno in February 1998, and concluded in June 1999. It stars Danna García, and Julián Arango.

After the success of the telenovela in its original broadcast, it was retransmitted on 19 October 2000 on Canal Uno, and since then it has not been retransmitted. In 2010 an adaptation with the same name was made for the United States, which premiered on Telemundo and starred Carlos Ponce.

== Plot ==
The story revolves around Antonio Brando (Julián Arango) and Sofía Santana (Danna García), both strangers who know each other after Antonio decided to place a bet with his cousin.

== Cast ==
- Danna García as Sofía Santana
- Julián Arango as Antonio Brando "El Perro"
- Isabella Santodomingo as Camila Brando
- Óscar Borda as Ricardo Pérez "Rocky París"
- Ana María Orozco as Verónica Murillo
- Fernando Solórzano as Bernardo Caparroso "Benny"
- Frank Ramírez as Pedro Brando
- Diego Trujillo as Gonzalo Cáceres
- Patricia Maldonado as Rosario Sierra de Santana
- Consuelo Luzardo as Carmen de Brando
- Carmenza Gómez as Cristina de Brando
- Jorge Enrique Abello as Diego Tamayo
- Christian del Real as Christian
- Fanny Lu as Ana María Brando
- Estefanía Gómez as Peggy Camacho
- Cheo Feliciano as Himserlf
- Joe Arroyo as Himserlf
