= Padres e Hijos =

Colombian television program

- Country of origin: Colombia
- Original language: Spanish

Original release
- Network: Canal A (1993-1998); Canal Uno (1998-1999); Caracol TV (1999-2009)
- Release: May 15, 1993 – August 21, 2009

Padres e Hijos (English: "Parents and Children") is a long-running Colombian daytime series produced by Colombiana de Televisión.

On August 21, 2009 the last Padres e Hijos episode of the series aired, due to the cancellation of its contract with Caracol TV. Ana María Abello starred as Fabiana.

== Relatives ==
- Lina Tejeiro
