= Jorge Enrique Pulido TV =

Jorge Enrique Pulido TV was a Colombian programadora that operated between 1979 and May 1990, owned and operated by the journalist Jorge Enrique Pulido. It is one of the few programadoras to disappear outside of a bidding cycle, doing so six months after his assassination at the hands of the Medellín Cartel in late 1989.

== History ==
The company was awarded one hour a week of programming in 1979 — a paltry amount for a programadora to receive. The programs he aired were of the current affairs/public interest variety, including shows such as Canal Abierto, Las Investigadores and the news program Noticiero Mundovisión, which he hosted at the time of his death and an edition of which he had just finished producing at the Inravisión studios in Bogotá when, leaving the studios, he was killed. The company also presented two kids' programs and two entertainment programs.
