= Datos y Mensajes =

Datos y Mensajes was a Colombian programadora founded in 1979 by Andrés Pastrana and disestablished in the early 2000s. It mainly focused on news programs, including its flagship program Noticiero TV Hoy (1979–2001).

== History ==
In 1991, upon the split of programadoras across Cadena Uno and Canal A, Datos y Mensajes became part of the former group, which had 12 programadoras. It was one of five on that channel with a license to broadcast news. During this time, it was a member of OTI Colombia, a coalition that also included Producciones PUNCH, Producciones JES, Caracol Televisión, RTI Colombia and RCN Televisión and brought the World Cup and Olympic Games to the country.

It moved over to Canal A after the 1998 bidding cycle, where in early 2000 and mid-2001, amidst the growing programadoras crisis (ironically, under Pastrana's presidency), it was one of several companies that partnered to attempt a coherent programming schedule for the channel from 1:00 to 8:00 pm, along with Coestrellas, Big Bang TV and Mejía & Asociados. This partnership was a disaster, claiming the life of Noticiero TV Hoy in December 2001 after 22 years uninterrupted on the air. It was Colombia's second-longest-running newscast ever (after Noticiero 24 Horas) and the oldest newscast on air by the time it bid farewell.

By 2000, Datos y Mensajes had entered bankruptcy; after eight months of negotiations, it agreed to with a restructuring agreement with its creditors. The company would disappear by early 2003.
