= CM& =

- Directed by: Yamid Amat
- Country of origin: Colombia
- Original language: Spanish

Original release
- Network: Canal 1
- Release: 2 January 1992 – 14 November 2024

CM& (Compañía de Medios de Información) (formerly known as NotiCentro 1 CM&) was a Colombian programadora established in 1992. It was one of the few programadoras that survived the crisis of the late 1990s and early 2000s, doing so by creating a two-hour news block in prime time (horario estelar). Its main program is Noticias CM&, created by Yamid Amat and Juan Gossaín and aired on Canal 1. The acronym with the ampersand was adopted in 1993. The last edition was aired on November 14, 2024.

== See also ==
- Yamid Amat
- Juan Gossaín
- Canal 1
