= 24 Horas (Colombian TV program) =

Colombian newscast television program

24 Horas was a Colombian newscast television program, produced by the programadora of the same name. It aired between January 3, 1977 and January 21, 2000.

It had reigned at the 7:00 pm timeslot on weeknights for more than 20 years, but the new timeslot awarded in the licitación of 1997 and the programadoras crisis that soon followed brought the program and programadora to their end. At the time it ended, it was the longest-running newscast airing on Colombian television; after the end of 24 Horas, this title passed to Datos y Mensajes with its Noticiero TV Hoy.
