= Audiovisuales =

Audiovisuales was a Colombian programadora. It was owned by the Colombian Ministry of Communications. It mainly produced educational and cultural programs for the Inravisión channels.

Its ownership put it in a unique position on two occasions. In 1995, Producciones Cinevisión folded. Audiovisuales took over the program slots of Cinevisión for the next four months. By May 2000, as the programadoras crisis continued to develop, it had 41 hours of programming a week compared to merely four a week after the licitación of 1991. By 2003, at the height of the programadoras crisis, it was the producer of almost all of the programs screened on Canal A, the second national network.

It ceased operations in 2004 as Inravisión was liquidated. It had 57 employees when it closed.
