= Programadora =

Colombian television companies under unique state-run system

In Colombian broadcasting, programadoras (literally programmer) are companies that produce television programs, especially for the public-commercial Canal Uno (and, until 2003, Canal A/Segunda Cadena).

The Colombian television model from 1954 to the late 1990s, known as the sistema mixto ("mixed system"), relied on programadoras as the sole producers of programs that aired on the two major channels. Following the introduction of two national private television channels to the country in the late 1990s, the recession of that same time period and a resulting combination of falling ratings and declining advertising revenues, the programadoras went into a tailspin that led to many closing in bankruptcy or becoming production companies for the private networks. By 2003, only seven programadoras were left on Canal Uno, later reduced to four. In May 2017, Plural Comunicaciones, a consortium including several former programadoras, took total control of Canal Uno's operations, marking the first time since the 1950s that one entity was responsible for programming the network's entire broadcast day.

== History ==
=== 1950s-70s ===
In 1955, the Colombian government created what would be the model of national television for the next four decades. For the preceding year, the lone national channel had focused exclusively on educational and cultural programs. However, a fall in the world price of coffee, the country's principal export, forced the government to cut the portion of its budget allotted to television. The government devised a system in which commercial programs during prime time would subsidize educational programs during the day.

Private companies bid to lease timeslots to air their shows on the Cadena Nacional (National Channel), which was the only TV network in the country. The government, in turn (from 1964, through Inravisión, the state broadcaster), chose the timeslots and the programs they should air, and operated the national television infrastructure. The first of the major production companies began to spring up, such as Producciones PUNCH (the first programadora, founded in 1956) and RTI Colombia. Radio networks RCN (in 1967) and Caracol (in 1963) also entered the new medium of television; their initial joint effort, a programadora known as TVC, briefly held a contract to program as much as 50% of the broadcast day, but did not meet with success. When Colombia gained a second national channel in 1972, Segunda Cadena, companies were assigned slots on both channels indiscriminately, and the mixed system began its 26-year reign as the undisputed model of commercial television in Colombia.

=== The licitación ===
Every several years—often in every government—bidding cycles known as licitaciones were opened. At these times, new potential programadoras would bid, old ones would compete for new positions, and some would leave the air. At the start of the next calendar year, television schedules completely changed. These bidding cycles occurred in 1972, 1975, 1977, 1981, 1983, 1987, 1991 (see below), and 1997. (Note the varied length of the concessions: three years in the 1970s, two years in the early 1980s, four years in the mid-late 1980s, and six years after the passage of the Colombian Constitution of 1991.) There was also a small licitación in 1991 to award the former slots of Promec Televisión (which went bankrupt) and Jorge Enrique Pulido TV (whose owner was murdered); a larger off-cycle licitación in 1996 that awarded the former slots of Producciones Cinevisión and one in 2000 that awarded spaces returned by programadoras including TeVecine and DFL Televisión.

Newscasts were particularly affected by these bidding periods, being particular points of pressure from political parties. New ones would appear after licitaciones and old ones might disappear (such as QAP after 1997) or move to new time slots (for instance, Datos y Mensajes and its flagship Noticiero TV Hoy wound up moving from weekdays to weekends in 1992; the Noticiero 24 Horas in 1998 found itself moving from its traditional 7pm time to 12:30pm; both newscasts were linked with factions of the Colombian Conservative Party). Newscasts either ran on weekdays or on weekends and holidays. At some licitaciones (such as 1991), those wishing to bid for a newscast could not bid for any other programming. The pressure for equal political representation made the production of newscasts among the most coveted and scrutinized elements of the mixed system. For instance, the 1983 round of concessions awarded six spaces for newscasts, three of them to conservative interests and three to liberals.

Most programadoras that disappeared prior to the programadoras crisis did so at the end of one of those calendar years (for instance, Noticiero Criptón, a programadora that produced the newscast by the same name, left the air at the end of 1997). There were several exceptions: Jorge Enrique Pulido TV ceased operations in 1990 after its proprietor was murdered, and Multimedia Televisión; Promec Televisión; and Cromavisión were forced out for nonpayment of debt (after caducidad administrativa, or administrative expiration of the contracts these companies had with Inravisión, was declared).

Separate bidding cycles were held to program holidays (festivos), usually with movies and special programs. Promec and Producciones Eduardo Lemaitre, later to be known as CPT, were pioneers in this venue of programming. CPT was sold in 1988, did not bid in 1991, and returned at the start of 1998.

In 1988, OTI Colombia was formed, a consortium of the programadoras such as R.T.I., Caracol, RCN, PUNCH, Producciones JES, and Datos y Mensajes, which were already individual members of the Organización de Televisión Iberoamericana (OTI). The consortium was created to join forces in major events for which they had the broadcasting rights through OTI, such as the Olympic Games, the FIFA World Cup, and the OTI Festival.

=== 1991 changes ===
The Colombian Constitution of 1991 precipitated major changes in the way the licensing was handled. 31 programadoras applied, and 24 won. These 24 were split into two groups of 12, originally dubbed Telenorte and Telesur, that would air their programs on competing channels. There were several other major changes:

- The quota for nationally-produced content increased, from 50% to 60%.
- In the 1987 bidding cycle, programadoras were allocated between 4 and 13.5 hours a week. In the 1991 bidding cycle, the minimum was 8 hours a week, with a maximum of 16. For most companies, this was a major increase in output, which came with increased costs to Inravisión for the programming time. (The minimum was further raised to 9.5 hours a week in the licitación of 1997.)
- A new governing body was established (in accordance with Article 77 of the Constitution of 1991) to relieve Inravisión of its regulatory functions: the Comisión Nacional de Televisión (National Television Commission or CNTV). This entity began operations in 1995.

Initially, the contract would run for six years with the government retaining the option to extend the contracts for another six. This element was dropped in a new television law late in 1996, which thus meant that a new licitación would take place in 1997 with new programming in 1998. QAP, known for its impartiality and independence, believed that this act served solely to get them (as well as several other newscasts critical of the government) off the air and withdrew from the 1997 bidding.

There were a variety of issues that accompanied the new bidding cycle:

- In the 1983 and 1987 bidding cycles combined, only three programadoras had disappeared as a result of losing bids, but six vanished in the 1991 cycle, including Do Re Creativa TV, which protested along with four other disqualified programadoras alleging the illegality of the licitación.
- It was worried that the Cadena Dos programadoras would be at a disadvantage. Even though the channels had similar coverage area and technical capacity, as both were managed by Inravisión from the same transmitter sites, it was perceived that their positioning after Cadena Uno might hurt them. They proposed the names Telecolombia and Telenacional for the two channels, but ultimately, the two channels became Cadena Uno and Canal A.

In March 1993, more ratings information came to Colombian screens. A court decision forced Inravisión to ban sexual and violent scenes from the franja familiar (family block). Programadoras were now required to state if the program was appropriate for minors to view. In addition, programadoras had to submit their material to Inravisión 72 hours in advance to determine its suitability.

One additional programadora would vanish in 1995-96, Producciones Cinevisión, on account of its internal problems. The spaces were returned to the CNTV.

=== Privatization, recession and crisis ===
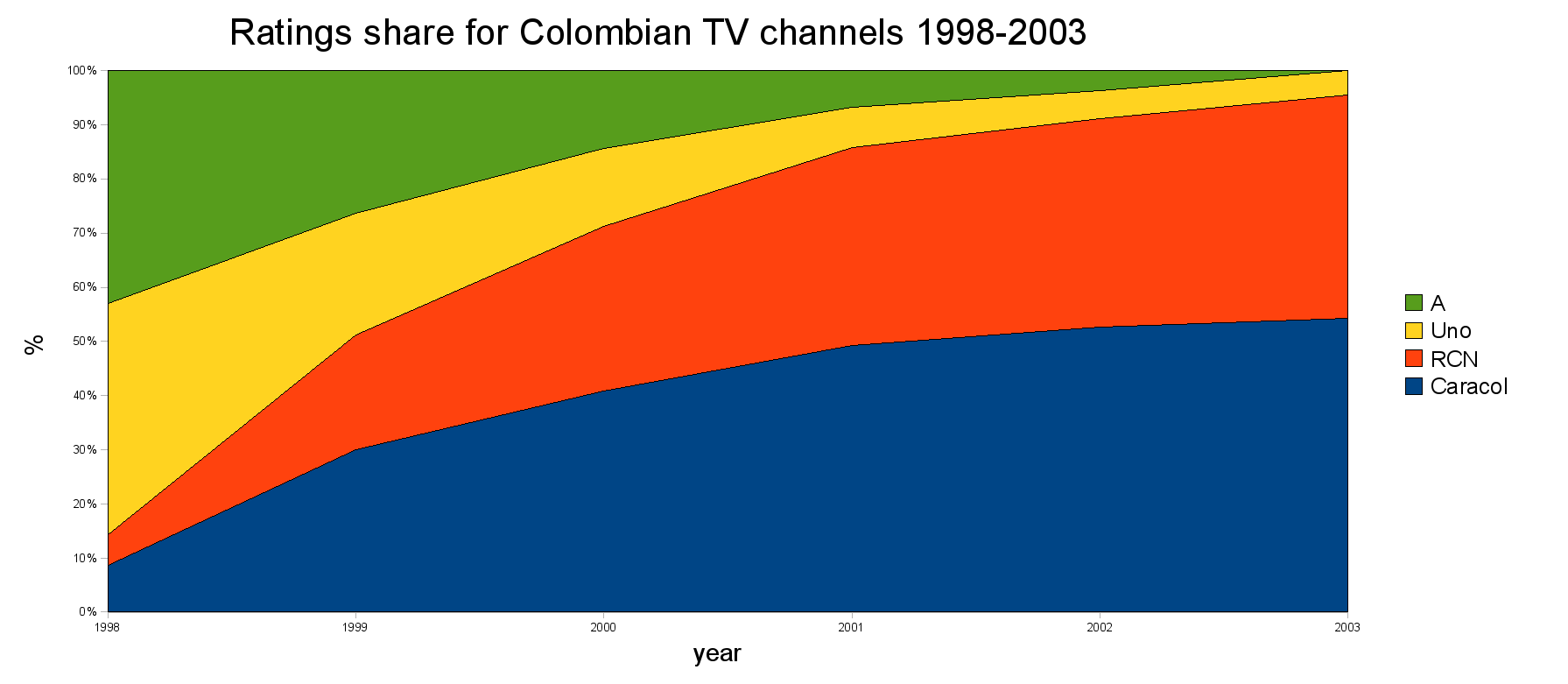
Ratings share for Colombian TV channels 1998-2003. Note the shrinkage of the green and yellow spaces belonging to Canal A and Canal Uno and corresponding growth of RCN (red) and Caracol (blue). Source: IBOPE

In 1997, Colómbia awarded two private television licenses to Caracol and RCN, two of the largest programadoras; their channels took to the air on 10 July 1998. Some 25 programadoras still applied for spaces on the two channels in the licitación of 1997, however, including Caracol and RCN which had limited spaces on the two major channels from January–July 1998. However, Caracol and RCN enjoyed limited output; notably, Caracol was left without any timeslots on Saturdays. Other programadoras presented Caracol's marquee programs on that day, the Premier Caracol movie (Andes Televisión and the revived CPT) and the long-running Sábados Felices variety show (Coestrellas/CPS/Proyectamos Televisión).

Understanding that more unity was needed within each channel against the new competition, programadoras began to find ways to cooperate. The twelve Canal A companies formed the Canal A Society, within which each of the programadoras acquired a program specialty. For instance, RTI produced novelas and large-scale game shows, while En Vivo was placed in charge of developing a channel-wide news service. They also contracted one agency, Mejía y Asociados, to market advertising for the entire channel, while they began selling and buying programs as a single group on the international market. There was significantly less cooperation on Canal Uno, where companies operated in a much more independent manner, though several groups of companies began creating common advertising firms.

It was known at the time that the public-commercial Inravisión channels would be affected, but nobody predicted it would be as rapid a change as it was. In the first year of the private channels, they were growing at the rate anticipated for their fifth year of broadcasting.

The timing was exceedingly poor. Along with the decreases in advertising revenue related to the Colombian recession of the late 1990s, many of the major advertisers, linked to the economic groups that controlled Caracol and RCN, pulled their advertising budgets from the mixed system. To survive financially, many companies turned to televentas, or infomercials, but those caused viewers to flee Canal Uno and Canal A, as did the increased programming flexibility enjoyed by the new private channels. The crisis was on.

By 1999, the programadoras had asked for six of the eighteen daily hours of programming to be removed and for license costs to be lowered; their collective deficits had reached 100 billion Colombian pesos (about US$53 million) and by 2001, their combined debts would exceed 26 billion pesos (about US$11.3 million). Colombiana de Televisión saw itself forced to sell its star program, Padres e Hijos, to competitor Caracol in order to stay afloat.

The year 2000 saw several important programadoras leave the air: TeVecine, DFL Televisión, PUNCH, JES and Cenpro Televisión all returned their spaces to the CNTV. As the spaces came in, Audiovisuales, the state programadora, saw a sharp and unexpected increase in its output — from a mere 5.5 hours at the start of 1998 to 41 hours a week after PUNCH's departure. Many of these programs were repeats, which led to further ratings declines. Companies like JES went from being programadoras to program producers for the private networks.

By March 2001, six companies had fallen under Ley 550, the bankruptcy reorganization law then in force in Colombia; this number rose to seven by July. Later in the year, En Vivo, which produced the weeknight 9:30pm newscasts on Canal A, made the decision to cease operations for reasons that included nonpayment of salaries of reporters and a debt of 14 billion Colombian pesos (over US$6 million). Less than ten programadoras were left by August 2001. Some companies continued to work together, such as a partnership on Canal A that included Coestrellas, Datos y Mensajes and two other programadoras, but that flopped so badly that Datos y Mensajes' flagship news program, Noticiero TV Hoy, was off the air by the end of 2001.

The situation continued to worsen, and one channel was affected more than the other: while early on it had a ratings advantage over its public competitor, Canal A began to experience serious issues. One week in March, Noticiero Hora Cero, the last news program on the channel, and its producer CPS went off the air for lack of money, its news director calling the action a sign of the sure death of that channel; the next, Andes Televisión and Proyectamos Televisión turned in their slots and called it quits due to the CNTV banning infomercials and depriving the companies of vital revenues. The rapidly deteriorating situation prompted the El Tiempo newspaper to dub the channel "a dying lion", a riff on its long-standing lion-themed idents. Coestrellas's mid-2003 liquidation left just one programadora on the Canal A side standing, RTI. As part of a salvation plan (Plan de Salvamento) approved by the government on 19 June 2003, RTI was moved to Canal Uno. After several months of showing nothing but programs from Audiovisuales, the state programadora (an arm of the Ministerio de Comunicaciones), on 24 October 2003, Canal A became the government-controlled Señal Institucional.

Inravisión and Audiovisuales were liquidated in 2004, partly due to the programadoras crisis but also due to out-of-date equipment and, in the case of the former, costly pension liabilities. Inravisión was replaced by RTVC (Radio Televisión Nacional de Colombia), now known as RTVC Sistema de Medios Públicos.

=== After the crisis ===
The salvation plan of 2003 and the licitación of the same year resulted in a dramatic realignment of the survivors on Canal Uno. Of the seven remnants, six were grouped into time-sharing cooperatives: Jorge Barón Televisión with newcomer Sportsat, NTC with Colombiana de Televisión and RTI with Programar Televisión, along with CM&. Each of the four groups received 25% of Canal Uno's airtime, including the production of a newscast for each group.

The original length of these contracts was 10 years beginning 1 January 2004, but all except the RTI/Programar contract, which the companies opted to not renew, were extended in September 2013 by the Autoridad Nacional de Televisión (ANTV), successor of the CNTV, to an expiration date of 30 April 2017. RTVC Sistema de Medios Públicos, along with Jorge Barón/Sportsat, NTC/Coltevisión and CM&, currently program Canal Uno.

In November 2016, ANTV awarded Canal Uno's concession spaces for 10 years (starting in May 2017) to Plural Comunicaciones, a consortium of CM&, NTC, RTI and the US-based firm Hemisphere. The bidding was not without controversy. Jorge Barón Televisión had asked for a review of its 2013 request for a ten-year extension, which the ANTV denied. For its part, Programar Televisión filed a criminal complaint against Minister of Information Technologies and Communications David Luna and requested precautionary measures before the Superintendency of Industry and Commerce in order to stop the bidding, arguing that it was not true that the company had surrendered the timeslots it had until 2013. The ANTV defended itself by arguing that the adjudication in 2003 was made to a temporary union between Programar and RTI and which also applied for the 40-month extension that was given to the licensees in 2013, though RTI and Programar did not agree.

== Critical reception ==
Several television figures in Colombia have posthumously mourned the loss of the mixed system, noting that it was one of the reasons that television in Colombia developed to be stronger than that of its Latin American peers and that privatization, as happened with the launch of Caracol and RCN, killed off many positive qualities of Colombia's television industry. In a 2004 retrospective on 50 years of television in Colombia, Iván McAllister, then the president of Citytv Bogotá, noted: "The broadcast concessionaires knew what to abide by. There was a healthy market and a growing demand that allowed them to develop and consolidate themselves as television companies. That went away quickly with the new TV." Daisy Cañón noted in 2003 that the privatization of Colombian television caused it to step back from a pluralism perspective, as the ability of Caracol and RCN to attract viewers and ratings causes high-quality cultural and other programs to be missed. Paula Arenas, former head of Producciones Cinevisión, noted as part of Señal Colombia's series covering the 60th anniversary of television in Colombia that privatization caused television "as a creative exercise" to become a loss-making proposal and also that more recent Colombian television programs are more focused and formulaic.

Those that support privatization note that it made television much more responsive to viewer demands and increased the role of market forces in the Colombian television industry.

== See also ==
- Channel 2 (Israel) – adopted a similar model with 2 (initially 3) permanent companies alternating airtime by day from its 1993 official launch until the restructuring of commercial television there on November 1, 2017.
- Dutch public broadcasting system – a similar system in the Netherlands which was run mostly by member-based public broadcasting associations along with some private companies.
