= Colombiana de Televisión =

Colombiana de Televisión COLTELEVISIÓN
- Type: Business and television production
- Founded: June 16, 1972
- Founder: Francisco de Zubiría Gómez
- Headquarters: Bogotá, Colombia
- Website: coltevision.com

Colombiana de Televisión (shortened as Coltevisión or CTV) is a Colombian programadora for Canal Uno and Caracol Television. It is one of the few Canal Uno programadoras remaining. Some of its most popular shows are Padres e Hijos and Sweet, el dulce sabor del chisme. It was founded by Francisco de Zubiría Gómez on June 16, 1972.
