= Jorge Barón =

Colombian television presenter

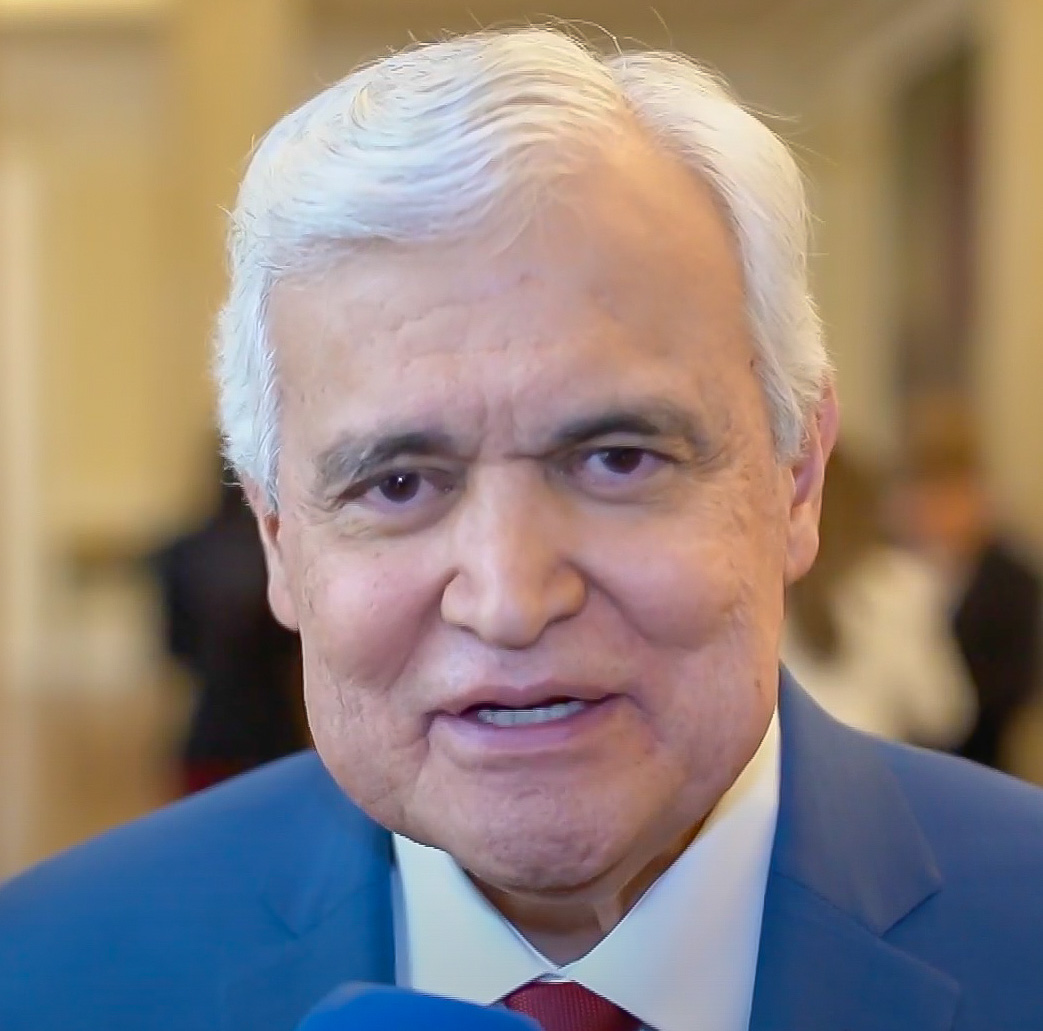
Jorge Baron in 2019.

Jorge Eliécer Barón Ortíz (born Jorge Eliécer Varón Ortíz 29 June 1948 in Ibagué) is a Colombian television presenter, media personality and businessman. By the mid-1980s, he was already a media sensation in Colombia and was broadcasting shows in other parts of the world, including the United States.

On May 24, 1969, Barón founded Jorge Barón Televisión, a Colombian programadora broadcast on Canal Uno and Caracol TV, most popularly known for its shows El Show de las Estrellas, Telepaís and 20/20. In 1989, it acquired the rights to show that year's Copa Libertadores. In that same year i record the program Embajadores de la música colombiana where they performed a concert called Colombia Te Quiero that developed in the Madison Square Garden in New York City attended by 30,000 Colombians. Since the arrival of private channels in Colombian television in 1998, it has decreased its output. As of 2020, El Show de las Estrellas currently airs on Canal RCN.

== Personal life ==
Barón has 5 children and 4 of them are named after him, Jorge. Barón's eldest son, Jorge L. Barón, is a member of the King County Council in Washington. His father Jorge Eliécer Barón is not mentioned in any of his campaign's public communication, nor is his Jorge Barón's connection to Colombia's economic and political elite.
