= Coestrellas =

Colombian programadora

Coestrellas was a Colombian programadora founded in 1981 by Fernando González Pacheco and Carlos Benjumea. Its original director was Bernardo Romero Pereiro. It was liquidated in 2003, one of the last casualties of the programadoras crisis of the early 2000s.

== History ==
=== Founding ===
There were five original owners of Coestrellas, each with 20 percent of the company: Benjumea, Pereiro, Fernando González Pacheco, and two businessmen, Gustavo Cárdenas Giraldo (president and legal representative) and Jorge Ospina (who would soon back out to work at his other programadoras, Prego Televisión and TeVecine — some of Ospina's stake was sold to Cárdenas's wife, Claudia Samper, a public relations expert).

=== Early years ===
In the 1981 bidding cycle, Coestrellas received 4 1/2 hours of programming each week. Sabariedades was the main vehicle that kept it afloat, a ninety-minute variety and game show that aired on Saturday afternoons on Cadena Uno and was presented by Pacheco and Benjumea. It enjoyed popularity among the Colombian public. Other programs included Cuentos y Leyendas, a Monday night program on Cadena Dos, and Siga la Pista, a Sunday show that aired at noon. From R.T.I. Colombia it acquired the rights to air Compre la Orquesta on Sunday nights.

=== Consolidation and development ===
For the 1983 bidding cycle, Coestrellas added an hour of allotted time to reach 5 1/2 hours a week of programs. Sabariedades continued, this time on Cadena Dos. In 1984, Dejémonos de Vainas, a major success for the programadora, premiered on that same channel, airing on Friday nights. In 1985, it partnered with RTI to produce Extorsión, one of the most violent series ever to be screened on Colombian television.

Monday nights included Compre la Orquesta, in collaboration with RTI, which may have been one of the most popular TV shows of the decade.

The 1987 bidding cycle gave Coestrellas 4 1/2 hours of weekly programming, but the allotted time blocks were not choice cuts. It worked with RCN, swapping time blocks with that programadora to keep Dejémonos de Vainas in a similar time slot until 1989, when it moved to Coestrella's adjacent block thirty minutes earlier on Cadena Uno.

Pacheco continued fronting some of Coestrella's most important programs, such as Charlas con Pacheco. Other major programs that Coestrellas broadcast were foreign imports (enlatados), such as CHiPs and Laverne and Shirley.

In 1987, Coestrellas founded Producciones Coestrellas, a company that loaned production and post-production equipment to other companies.

The 1991 bidding cycle more than doubled Coestrellas's allotted program hours from 4 1/2 to 10, this time all on Canal A. This is when it aired one of its most popular shows, Señora Isabel, which went on to enjoy national and international success. Many of Coestrellas's programs from this period dealt with issues such as alcoholism (in Copas amargas, 1996) and bisexuality (Géminis, 1995). However, El octavo pecado (1997) didn't work out. Changes to the program schedule that took effect at the start of 1998, with a new bidding cycle underway, severely hurt it. Ironically, it went up against RTI's powerful Quiere Cacao, hosted by Pacheco. Ultimately the show was suspended and main actor Jorge Félix Alis left Colómbia.

=== Later years: 1997-2003 ===
Pereiro retired in 1997 to found his own programadora, Producciones Bernardo Romero Pereiro, but it still received 9.5 hours (the minimum possible) of Canal A programming time. While Dejémonos de Vainas continued to enjoy decent ratings, it also was criticized heavily. It was removed from the air, airing for the last time on Sunday, August 16, 1998. Another important presentation for Coestrellas in 1998 (in conjunction with CPS and Proyectamos Televisión) was Caracol's Sábados Felices, as Caracol (soon on its way to private television) was not awarded any time on Saturdays.

Coestrellas was one of the programadoras that received RCN's airtime upon RCN becoming a private TV channel in 1998. But later all the companies that had received airtime from Caracol and RCN had to return those blocks to Inravisión.

The last gasp for Coestrellas as a traditional programadora came in 2001. Facing the programadoras crisis that had started a few years earlier, it allied with Datos y Mensajes, Mejía & Asociados and Big Bang TV to program Canal A from 1:00pm to 8:00pm in a bid to make the channel more coherent. The results were disastrous, and all programmers involved were affected: the flagship program of Datos y Mensajes, Noticiero TV Hoy, aired its final program at the end of 2001, ending 22 straight years on the air. All four involved programadoras pulled out.

In mid-2003, Cárdenas, the only remaining owner, had the company liquidated. It was the last of the Canal A programadoras to leave the air, at which point R.T.I. moved to Canal Uno.

In 2006, Mejía & Asociados acquired Coestrellas and operates it mostly as a film library for the programs it produced, though the possibility of a return to program production has not been ruled out.
