= Sábados Felices =

Colombian comedy show

- Presented by: Humberto Rodríguez
- Country of origin: Colombia
- Original language: Spanish

Production
- Running time: 3 hours
- Production company: Caracol Televisión (1972–present)

Original release
- Network: Segunda Cadena/Cadena 2/Canal A (1972–1976, 1987–1991, 1998); Primera Cadena/Cadena Uno/Canal Uno (1977–1983, 1984–1987, 1992–1997); Caracol (1998–present)
- Release: February 5, 1972

Sábados Felices (lit. 'Happy Saturdays') is a Colombian comedy show that debuted in 1972. It has been produced by Caracol Televisión for its entire run on the air; from 1972 to 1998, when Caracol was a programadora, it aired on Cadena Uno. It has been hosted by Alfonso Lizarazo, Alí Humar, Jota Mario Valencia, Carlos Calero, Hernán Orjuela and Humberto Rodríguez.

== History ==
It began in 1972 as Campeones de la risa, changing names in 1976 when Caracol for the first time gained the rights to its Saturday timeslot.

After the licitación of 1997, Caracol did not receive any timeslots on Saturdays. This meant that Caracol's signature Saturday programs were presented for the first seven months of 1998 under the auspices of other programadoras; Sábados Felices was presented by Coestrellas, CPS and Proyectamos Televisión. The 1998 move of Caracol from a programadora to a private television channel, after 1,323 episodes had been aired, marked a format change for the program.

In 2016, it received the Guinness World Record for the world's oldest comedy show.

== Overview ==
Sections that make up the program consist of parodies based on the productions that Canal Caracol (producer of the program) has made such as “Ría a Ría”, “Mensa para tres”, “La Plaga” (which are recorded in their original set), "Las telebobelas", "El Parón", "Sirirí A.I", "La Casa de la cucha", "The Toxics", "Humour à la demande", "To laugh seriously", "Who seeks finds", "Caught the detail", these last two brought an error for viewers to guess, and send a letter with the answer to participate for different prizes, and other parodies on national and international news, contests as well as the social campaign: “A smile for Peace.”

The music of the show is produced by the group Guns n' Risas.

== Current cast ==
- Hugo Patiño "The Prince of Marulanda" (1972–present)
- David Alberto García "Jeringa" (1987-1998, 2000-2004, 2012- present)
- Heriberto Sandoval "The Pacific of Cabrera" (1991-1998, 2000–present)
- Cesar Corredor "Barbarita" (1991–present)
- Alexandra Restrepo (1992–present)*
- Nelson Polanía "Polilla" (1996-1998, 2002–present)
- Jesús Emilio Vera "Chumillo" (1998–present)
- María Auxilio Vélez (2003–present)
- Gustavo Villanueva "Triki Trake" (2004-2019, 2020–present)
- Heidi Corpus (2004–present)*
- Pedro Antonio González "Don Jediondo" (2004–present)
- Juan Guillermo Zapata "Carroloco" (2007–present)
- Susana López "Susy" (2010–present)
- Alexander Rincón & Roberto Lozano "Los Siameses" (2011–present)
- Carlos Sánchez "El Mono" (2011–present)
- Édgar Sánchez Torres "Junífero" (2011–present)
- John Jairo Londoño "Fosforito" (2011–present)
- Frey Eduardo Quintero "Boyacomán" (2011-2022, 2023–present)
- José Castellón "Joselo" (2011–present)
- Julián Madrid "Piroberta" (2011–present)
- Mauricio Núñez "Chester" (2011–present)
- Diego López, Elkin Rueda, Javier Ramírez & Mauricio Ramírez "Grupo Salpicón" (2013–present)
- Tahiana Bueno (2014–present)*
- Fernando Monge (2015–present)*
- Jorge Muñoz "Tato" (2015–present)
- Carlos Andrés Mejía "Obvidio" (2017–present)
- Hugo Neimer González "Lucumí" (2018–present)
- Óscar Díaz "El Pollo" (2018–present)
- Jhovany Ramírez "Jhovanoty" (2018–present)
- Doriam Rosero & Alfonso Sierra "The Trovators from Cuyes" (2019–present)
- Leonardo Cuervo (2021–present)
- Miguel Ángel Álvarez "Thor" (2022–present)*
- Katherine Giraldo (2022–present)
- Andrés Leonardo Velásquez "El Pato Velásquez” (2023–present)
- Gerónimo Zavala "Nospi Zavala" (2024–present)
- Lía Baena (2025–present)

*: Only performance in Sketches

== Controversies ==
The show has been criticized for the blackface character Soldado Micolta, also the comedians Peter Albeiro and Carroloco have been accused of having ties to the Clan del Golfo drug trafficking organization, both being denied by the comedians, the comedian Juan Ricardo Lozano "Alerta" sued the Caracol channel at the beginning of 2024 for an alleged unjustified dismissal of the program.

== See also ==
- Caracol TV
