= TeVecine =

TeVecine (styled as T.V. Cine in the early 1990s) is a Colombian programadora created in 1982, though it did not start operations as a programadora until 1987.

== History ==
It was created in 1982 by Jorge Ospina. In 1985, it became the producer of the program El Club de los Bulliciosos until 1987, when it became a programadora, with El Club de los Bulliciosos and Romeo y Buseta as its first programs. In 1992, TeVecine continued the production of El Show de Jimmy after Do Re Creativa TV studio was closed. After the privatization of Caracol and RCN in 1998, Tevecine had some hours of programming time on Canal Uno and at last disappeared in March 2000. In 2003, it underwent restructuring as part of bankruptcy proceedings. it currently is a private producer for RCN.
