= Yo y tú =

- Created by: Alicia del Carpio
- Country of origin: Colombia

Original release
- Release: 22 March 1956 – 1976

Yo y tú ("Me and You") was a long-running Colombian situation comedy, created by Spanish-born actress Alicia del Carpio. During its 20-year run on Sunday evenings, around 175 of the most famous Colombian actors appeared on it.

There was a brief "second season" in 1985, which would be cancelled February 1986.

After its end, del Carpio donated the scripts to Inravisión, the state broadcaster.
