= Producciones JES =

Colombian TV production company

- Founded: 1964
- Founder: Julio Enrique Sánchez
- Defunct: 2018
- Headquarters: Bogotá, Colombia
- Products: Television programming and airtime

Producciones JES was a Colombian television production company and programadora. It was founded in 1964. The name was based on the founder's initials; Julio Enrique Sánchez (1930–2024).

== History ==
Among the programs Producciones JES carried were cartoons, foreign programs and (most importantly) the Academy Awards (broadcast on RCN Televisión), Miss Universe (broadcast on Caracol Televisión) and Grammy Awards (broadcast on Citytv Bogotá).

It was one of the programadoras that became part of the association OTI de Colómbia, which produced the Olympic Games and the World Cup. Other members of OTI included RCN TV, RTI Colombia, Caracol Televisión, Producciones PUNCH and Datos y Mensajes.

Suffering a fate similar to that of Promec Televisión after the licitación of 1997, its poor scheduling helped to contribute to the decline of the company. It ceased being a programadora on Thursday, September 14, 2000, Producciones JES was however revived in 2002 in a much smaller scale and continued in that form until its final liquidation in 2018.

== Historically important programs ==
- Sangre de lobos
- La maldición del paraíso
- Espectaculares JES (1967–94)
- Panorama (1985–2000, 2002–2005)
