= Producciones PUNCH =

Colombian television production company

Producciones PUNCH was a Colombian programadora. It was the first programadora to be established in 1956, founded by the Peñaranda family.

== History ==
PUNCH was involved in many firsts in Colombian television, including the following:

- They were the first in the country to produce a live remote broadcast.
- In 1957, PUNCH became the first programadora to produce and air a daily newscast (the 15 minute El Reporter Esso, which later became the Noticiero Suramericano).
- In 1959, PUNCH debuted the program El 0597 está ocupado, considered to be the first Colombian telenovela.

It wasn't just a programadora, however: one of its early businesses was outdoor advertising.

It was one of the programadoras that became part of the association OTI de Colombia, which produced the Olympic Games and the World Cup. Other members of OTI included RCN TV, RTI Colombia, Caracol TV, Producciones JES and Datos y Mensajes. In the private channel bidding of 1997, it was one of the losing bids (leading a consortium known as T.V. Color S.A.).

=== Closure ===
In May 2000, PUNCH returned all of its programming spaces to Inravisión. It was not the first programadora to do so, but it was the most important occurrence of such at the time. Audiovisuales took over the spaces, increasing its program output to 41 hours a week. Though at the time it continued production for Caracol Televisión, its administration was declared expired in July 2000 for not honoring its debts.

== Historically important programs ==
=== Self-produced ===
- Vuelo secreto

=== Imported ===
- Baywatch
- Walker, Texas Ranger

== Logo ==
- 1956-1963: The word PUNCH in gel form.
- 1963-1970: A silhouette of a television camera in which the word PUNCH Is written.
- 1970-1979: A silhouette of a television camera containing black lines connecting with the word PUNCH.
- 1979-1981: The same logo but with the lines of the camera and the word PUNCH in white with a black background.
- 1981-1986: The usual logo in gold with flashes of brilliance surrounding the figure of the camera and a black background
- 1986-1991: Pink lines forming a TV screen with a blue background divided into 2 fields with the parts above and below fragmented into red orange and pink colors and the word PUNCH in pink in the center.
- 1991–2000: The silhouette of a TV screen with a red sphere with 6 fragments of red orange and yellow (3 up and 3 down), a curved black blackground, and PUNCH written in red.
