= Canal A =

Colombian over-the-air television network

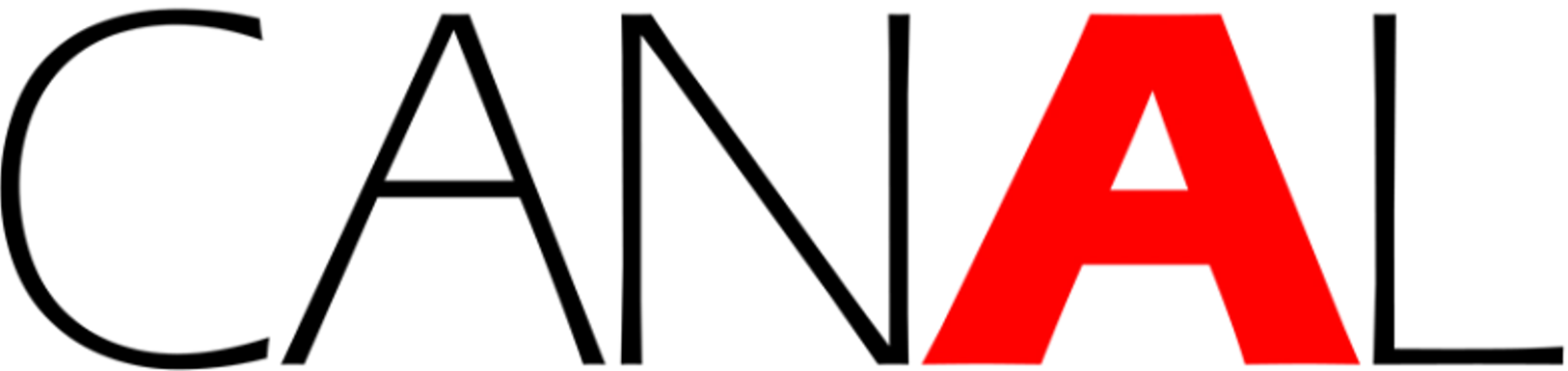
- Type: Free-to-air television network
- Country: Colombia
- Broadcast area: Colombia

Programming
- Picture format: 480i SDTV

Ownership
- Owner: Government of Colombia (operated by Inravisión)

History
- Launched: March 7, 1972 (as Tele 9); January 27, 1974 (as Segunda Cadena)
- Founder: Carlos Lleras Restrepo
- Closed: February 1, 2004
- Replaced by: Canal Institucional
- Former names: Segunda Cadena (1973–1979; 1979–1983); Segunda Cadena Color (1979); Cadena Dos or Cadena 2 (1984–1991)

Canal A (previously known as Cadena Dos) was a Colombian open television network launched on January 16, 1971, under the name Tele9 Corazón (pronounced "telenueve corazón").

== History ==
TV9 Telebogotá (Teletigre), the first private television station in Colombia, began broadcasting on January 14, 1966. It was founded by Consuelo Salgar de Montejo, a journalist, politician, and businesswoman. It broadcast on channel 9 of the VHF band in Bogotá and could also be tuned in to the rest of Cundinamarca, Tolima and part of Huila. Due to its strong opposition to the corruption of the National Front, a coalition between the Conservative and Liberal parties that alternated power, the television channel was expropriated on January 2, 1971, and became administered by the State. TV9 Telebogotá changed its name to Tele 9 Corazón two weeks later, on January 16 of the same year.

The station changed its name again on March 27, 1972. Its new name became Segunda Cadena (Second Network), and it began to increase its coverage with the installation of repeater stations at the national level in 1974. In 1979, due to the arrival of the color television to Colombia. It temporarily changed its name to Segunda Cadena Color, and again in 1984 as Cadena Dos. Finally, in 1992 it changed its name to Channel A. This latest name change was made to encourage competition with its sister channel Cadena Uno, since the programmers had spaces on only one channel; Previously, the programmers were assigned spaces indistinctly in both channels.

Until 1998, together with Channel 1 and Señal Colombia, they were the only television stations in the country with national coverage. However, the entry into operation of the private channels Caracol and RCN and the economic crisis at the beginning of the 2000s left Canal A and the Canal Uno without programmers, who declared bankruptcy or became production companies.

By March 2003, numerous programmers had left the channel, leaving only RTI and Coestrellas. In 2003, RTI Televisión, the only remaining programmer on Channel A, moved to Channel One, thanks to a rescue plan for programmers in crisis, approved by the Comisión Nacional de Televisión on June 19 of the aforementioned year. After several months of broadcasting only the spaces of the state programming Audiovisuales, on February 2, 2004, Canal A definitively closed its transmissions as a commercial public television channel, changing its name to Señal Colombia Institucional, with a political focus in its programming.

== See also ==
- Canal Institucional
- Television in Colombia
