= Canal 1 =

Colombian national TV network

- Logo used since 2026. This logo concept has been in use since 2017.
- Type: Broadcast television network Free-to-air television network
- Country: Colombia
- Broadcast area: Colombia

Programming
- Language: Spanish
- Picture format: 1080i HDTV (downscaled to 480i for the SD feed)

Ownership
- Owner: HMTV1 (privately operated by Phoenix Media)
- Key people: Ramiro Avendaño Jaramillo (President), Daniel Coronell (NTC), James McNamara (HMTV)

History
- Launched: 13 June 1954; 72 years ago
- Founder: Gustavo Rojas Pinilla
- Former names: HJRN-TV (1954–1956); Televisora Nacional de Colombia (1956–1963); Canal Nacional (1963–1973); Primera Cadena (1974–1979); Primera Cadena Color (1979–1981); Cadena Uno (1984–1997); Canal Uno (1998–2017)

Links
- Website: http://www.canal1.com.co

Availability

Terrestrial
- Analog VHF/UHF: Listings may vary
- Digital UHF: Channel 16.3

Canal 1 (English: Channel 1; pronounced "Canal Uno" (Spanish pronunciation: [kanˈal ˈuno]) is a Colombian free-to-air television channel. It is owned by HMTV1, a subsidiary of Hemisphere Media Group and managed by Phoenix Media, a private company. From 1957 to 2017, the channel was administered by private programming companies known as programadoras (television production companies; literally, "programmers"), which bid for time slots with the Colombian state.

== History ==
Canal 1's fifteenth and previous logo from 3 February 2014 to 13 August 2017

Canal 1's sixth and previous logo from 14 August 2017 to 14 March 2023

Canal 1's seventh and previous logo from 15 March 2023 to 30 September 2024

Canal 1 started broadcasting on 13 June 1954 as Canal Nacional on VHF channel 8 in Bogotá and channel 10 in Manizales and Medellín and was operated by the National Radio of Colombia. In 1963, it was operated by Inravisión (Instituto Nacional de Radio y Televisión), the now-former Colombian public broadcaster. Under Inravisión, the channel's frequency was moved from channel 8 to VHF channel 7 in Bogotá.

Until 1966, when private local channel Teletigre was officially launched, Canal Nacional was the only television channel in Colombia. Teletigre only covered Bogotá, meaning that the rest of the country only received the existing Inravisión channel.

On 1 January 1974, it became the Primera cadena (First Network) following the nationalization of Teletigre as Segunda Cadena a few years earlier (in 1971), by the order of the National Front and the reorganization of Inravisión's television networks. In the 1980s it would become Cadena Uno (Network One), and eventually became Canal Uno at the beginning of 1998.

The channel broadcast 24/7 from 21 March 1995; in conjunction with this, morning newscasts began. However, the project failed within less than a year due to lack of viewers and quality.

Since July 1998, when Caracol Televisión and RCN Televisión launched their own private television channels, Channel 1's and Canal A's ratings steadily dropped (see below chart). Adding this to the economic recession of the late 1990s the network was suffering, this situation severely affected the remaining programadoras, which gradually either declared bankruptcy or became production companies for Caracol Televisión and RCN Televisión. In order to solidify its position, the channel unveiled a new slogan, "Canal Uno, uno como ninguno" (Channel One, one like no one) in October 1998, in conjunction with its new name. However, according to a survey made by the channel at the time of the rebrand, most viewers did not understand the campaign. Channel 1 was less affected than Canal A, which became Canal Institucional, a State-controlled channel, in November 2003. RTI Colombia, the only programadora remaining on Canal A, was moved to Channel 1 and stood there until 2008.

In February 2014, the channel was rebranded with a new logo, a new graphical package, the removal of infomercials and a 24-hour program schedule.

As of 1 May 2017, a quarter of Channel 1's programming is made by the production companies CM&, NTC Televisión, and RTI Televisión, and a fifth by Hemisphere Media Group, the owner of Puerto Rican station WAPA and several pay-TV channels. The four companies form a joint venture company branded as Plural Comunicaciones.

On 12 January 2023, Phoenix Media acquired all the shares of Canal 1 from Plural.

== Audience Share ==
This is the evolution of the monthly audience share and position based on historical records for the channel. The measurement has been carried out by Kantar Ibope Media, a company that measures audience reception in Colombia.

	Jan	Feb	Mar	Apr	May	Jun	Jul	Aug	Sep	Oct	Nov	Dec	Position
1998	12,6 %	12,6 %	12,6 %	12,6 %	12,6 %	12,6 %	13,1 %	13,1 %	13,1 %	13,1 %	13,1 %	13,1 %	2
1999	11,3 %	11,3 %	11,3 %	11,3 %	11,3 %	11,3 %	11,7 %	11,7 %	11,7 %	11,7 %	11,7 %	11,7 %	2
2000	8,4 %	8,4 %	8,4 %	8,4 %	8,4 %	8,4 %	7,1 %	7,1 %	7,1 %	7,1 %	7,1 %	7,1 %	3
2001	4,4 %	4,4 %	4,4 %	4,4 %	4,4 %	4,4 %	4,7 %	4,7 %	4,7 %	4,7 %	4,7 %	4,7 %	3
2002	3,8 %	3,8 %	3,8 %	3,8 %	3,8 %	3,8 %	4,1 %	4,1 %	4,1 %	4,1 %	4,1 %	4,1† %	3
2003	2,8 %	2,8 %	2,8 %	2,8 %	2,8 %	2,8 %	2,4 %	2,4 %	2,4 %	2,4 %	2,4 %	2,4 %	3
2004	2,7 %	2,7 %	2,7 %	2,7 %	2,7 %	2,7 %	2,9 %	2,9 %	2,9 %	2,9 %	2,9 %	2,5 %	3
2005	2,2 %	2,2 %	2,2 %	2,2 %	2,2 %	2,2 %	2,2 %	2,2 %	2,2 %	2,2 %	2,2 %	2,2 %	3
2006	1,6 %	1,6 %	1,6 %	1,6 %	1,6 %	1,6 %	1,5 %	1,5 %	1,5 %	1,5 %	1,5 %	1,5 %	3
2007	1,2 %	1,2 %	1,2 %	1,2 %	1,2 %	1,2 %	1,3 %	1,3 %	1,3 %	1,3 %	1,3 %	1,3 %	4
2008	0,9 %	0,9 %	0,9 %	0,9 %	0,9 %	0,9 %	1 %	1 %	1 %	1 %	1 %	1 %	3
2009	0,9 %	0,9 %	0,9 %	0,9 %	0,9 %	0,9 %	0,7 %	0,7 %	0,7 %	0,7 %	0,7 %	0,7 %	4
2010	0,5 %	0,6 %	0,6 %	0,7 %	0,6 %	0,5 %	0,5 %	0,4 %	0,4 %	0,4 %	0,3 %	0,3 %	4
2011	0,4 %	0,4 %	0,5 %	0,5 %	0,4 %	0,4 %	0,4 %	0,3 %	0,3 %	0,3 %	0,3 %	0,3 %	5
2012	0,2 %	0,2 %	0,3 %	0,4 %	0,4 %	0,4 %	0,3 %	0,4 %	0,5 %	0,5 %	0,4 %	0,4 %	5
2013	0,3 %	0,3 %	0,2 %	0,3 %	0,3 %	0,5 %	0,5 %	0,3 %	0,3 %	0,3 %	0,2 %	0,3 %	5
2017	0,2 %	0,4 %	0,4 %	0,3 %	0,3 %*	0,3 %*	0,4 %*	0,4 %**	0,6 %**	0,8%**	1 %	0,8 %	4
2018	1,1 %	1,3 %	1,2 %	1,3 %	1,5 %		9,23 %		7,58 %				3

* Plural Comunicaciones Start | ** Plural Comunicaciones Relaunch

== See also ==
- Plural
- CM&
- NTC
- RTI
- Hemisphere
- NotiCentro 1 CM&
- Telenovelas and series of Colombia
- Television in Colombia
