= Apollo 11 in popular culture =

Cultural aspects of the first manned Moon landing

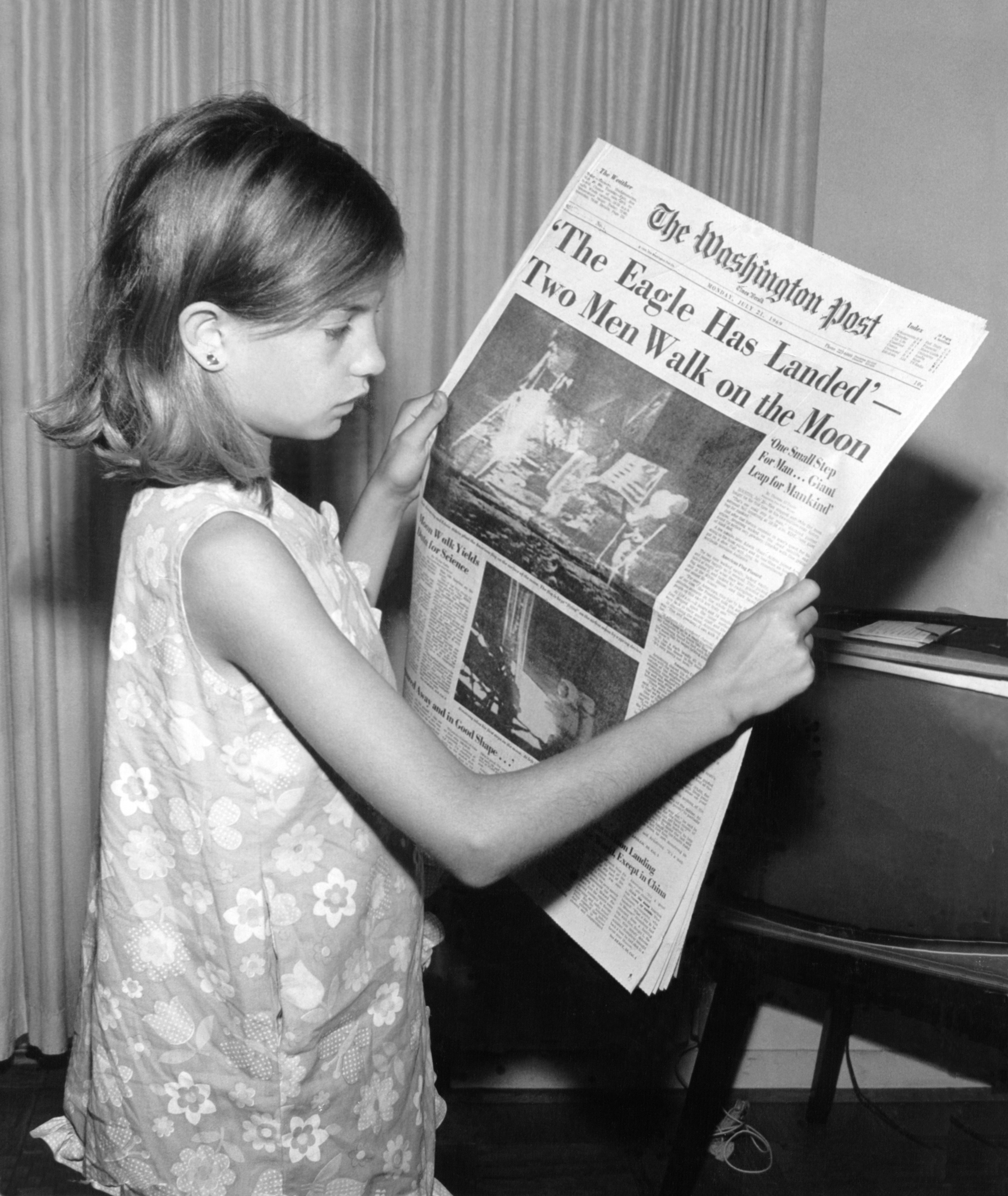
The Washington Post on Monday, July 21, 1969, stating 'The Eagle Has Landed—Two Men Walk on the Moon'

Apollo 11 was the first human spaceflight to land on the Moon. The 1969 mission's wide effect on popular culture has resulted in numerous portrayals of Apollo 11 and its crew, Neil Armstrong, Buzz Aldrin, and Michael Collins.

== Public reception ==
The mission was extensively covered in the press. Over 53.5 million US households tuned in to watch the Apollo 11 mission across the two weeks it was on TV, making it the most watched TV programming up to that date. An estimated 650 million viewers worldwide watched the first steps on the Moon.

After their return and ticker tape parades in New York and Chicago, a dinner event in Los Angeles, and an address to a joint session of Congress, the astronauts went on what was called the "Giant Leap" tour, visiting 23 countries in 38 days. Starting in Mexico City, where they donned sombreros and were given a second parade, their tour took them through South America, to Spain, France, the Netherlands, Belgium, Norway, Germany, England, and Vatican City. After a rest in the U.S. embassy in Rome they went on to Turkey and Africa. In Zaire, Buzz Aldrin leaped over the barricade between him and some entertainers and joined in with their dancing.

Missing from the tour was Hungary, which rejected the United States's invitation to host the astronauts. Relations between Hungary and the United States were strained at the time, as the Hungarian crown jewels had been taken into U.S. custody after the Second World War and would not be returned until 1978.

== Stamps ==
Many countries have issued stamps commemorating the mission.

The United States issued a US$2.40 stamp commemorating the 20th anniversary in 1989, a stamp for the 25th anniversary, and a 33¢ stamp commemorating the 30th anniversary in 1999. The 20th anniversary stamp caused some concern when it was issued, as the law forbade living people from being depicted on stamps, and the image was of two astronauts planting a U.S. flag on the Moon. However, it was never actually officially stated by the USPS that the figures were specifically Armstrong and Aldrin, and not just generic astronaut figures. Other stamps issued included a 10¢ stamp on 1969-09-09 showing an astronaut descending a ladder from a lunar module, and the US$9.95 anniversary stamp issued in 1994. The 1969 stamp art was by Paul Calle, the 1989 art by his son, and the 1994 one by both.

The postal service of Eire issued a commemorative €1 stamp for the 50th anniversary in 2019, but misspelled the word "gealach" (Gaelic for "Moon") as "gaelach" ("Irish"), an accidental transposition during design that was not caught in proof. The USPS issued two 50th anniversary stamps as part of its "Forever" collection, one a photograph of the Moon with the landing site marked, and the other one of Armstrong's pictures of Aldrin.

The astronauts themselves had, before the mission, signed what were called "insurance covers", stamped envelopes that were essentially life insurance in the form of memorabilia that family members could sell off in the events of the astronauts' deaths. This practice would continue through to Apollo 16.

Armstrong and Aldrin also cancelled a commemorative stamp whilst on the surface of the Moon. Originally, they were to have done this reciting pre-scripted dialogue that had been supplied by USPS public relations. But the supplied script was lengthy and stilted, the Washington Post commenting that it would have lasted "for the better part of one orbit of the moon" and resulted in "a veritable barrage of phone calls from a flabbergasted public", and NASA decided that the astronauts had enough to do; so the stamping was without ceremony.

== Acknowledgments and monuments ==
The United States of America acknowledged the success of Apollo 11 with a national day of celebration on Monday, July 21, 1969. All but emergency and essential employees were allowed a paid day off from work, in both government and the private sector. The last time this had happened was the national day of mourning on Monday, November 25, 1963, to observe the state funeral of President John F. Kennedy, who had set the political goal to put a man on the Moon by the end of the 1960s and bring him back to Earth safely.

A replica of the footprint left by Neil Armstrong is located at Tranquillity Park in Houston, Texas. The park was dedicated in summer of 1979, a decade after the first Moon landing. In 2019 Buzz Aldrin's well-known photograph of his own footprint was depicted on the Apollo 11 50th Anniversary commemorative coins.

The Apollo 11 Cave in Namibia was named after the flight upon its successful return to Earth.

A statue of Neil Armstrong by Jon Hair was unveiled at the University of Southern California in 2013, and The Eagle Has Landed, a 2019 sculpture designed by George Lundeen, Mark Lundeen, and Joey Bainer, is exhibited at the Kennedy Space Center Visitor Complex.

== Portrayal in media ==
=== Films and television ===
- CBS news coverage of the Apollo 11 landing included several aspects of portrayal. Grumman engineer Scott MacLeod portrayed Neil Armstrong descending from the steps of a full-scale model of the Lunar Module Eagle so that viewers could see what was happening before the live TV broadcast from the Moon began. Tom Sylvester portrayed Buzz Aldrin during the same broadcast.
- The 1969 documentary film, Footprints on the Moon by Bill Gibson and Barry Coe, is about the Apollo 11 mission.
- The 1971 documentary Moonwalk One is a film by Theo Kamecke.
- Footage of the landing famously introduced viewers to MTV in 1981, and served as its top and bottom of the hour identifier during the cable channel's early years. MTV producers Alan Goodman and Fred Seibert used this public domain footage to associate MTV with the most famous moment in worldwide television history. MTV also pays tribute to the classic ID by handing out astronaut statuettes (or "Moonmen") at its annual Video Music Awards.
- There is a brief mention of the Moon landing in the first season of the original Star Trek series in the episode "Tomorrow is Yesterday" in early 1967.
- In the 1995 film Apollo 13, based on the real mission, Jim Lovell, Jack Swigert, Fred Haise, Ken Mattingly, Pete Conrad, and Marilyn Lovell gather in the Lovell household to watch Neil Armstrong's Apollo 11 moonwalk. Later in the film, as the crew pass around the Moon, Haise points out that they're passing over the Mare Tranquillitatis and refers to it as "Neil and Buzz's old neighborhood". Armstrong and Aldrin talk to and distract Lovell's mother as she watches news reports of her son's endangered mission.
- The 1996 television docudrama Apollo 11 filmed some of its scenes in the original Apollo Mission Control Center.
- Portions of the Apollo 11 mission are dramatized in the 1998 HBO mini-series From the Earth to the Moon in the "Mare Tranquilitatis" episode.
- The second episode of Futurama, "The Series Has Landed" (1999) has Fry and Leela take refuge in the Eagle (which had since been returned to the Moon) to shelter from the cold night of the Moon. Fry finds one of Neil Armstrong's footprints, which he steps on.
- The 2000 film The Dish dramatises assorted mishaps in the run-up to the Moon landing at the Parkes Observatory dish, the Australian relay station scheduled to receive video footage of the landing.
- Man on the Moon, a 2006 television opera in one act by Jonathan Dove with a libretto by Nicholas Wright, relates the story of the Apollo 11 Moon landing and the subsequent problems experienced by Buzz Aldrin.
- The 2009 television film Moonshot depicts the preparation for the Apollo 11 mission.
- The Apollo 11 mission is used as a backdrop and plot device in the Doctor Who two-parter "The Impossible Astronaut"/"Day of the Moon".
- The Apollo 11 mission is used as part of the main story line in the 2011 film Transformers: Dark of the Moon. The movie described the mission and the main reason for the Apollo program's existence as a means to investigate an alien landing on the far side of the Moon. Aldrin has a brief cameo in the film.
- In the 2012 film Men in Black 3, Apollo 11 was used by Agent K to carry the Arc Net (a shield that protects Earth from Alien invasion) to space. The three astronauts see the Men in Black fighting the alien villain from the cockpit, but Buzz Aldrin realizes that if they report this to Mission Control the launch will be aborted. Armstrong nonchalantly responds to Aldrin that "I didn't see anything", and Michael Collins apparently agreed as well.
- The last episode of the 2015 television series The Astronaut Wives Club, "Landing", features the Apollo 11 mission.
- In Ready Jet Go!'s 2016 episode, "Earth Mission to Moon", Jet, Sean, Sydney, Mindy, Celery, and Carrot, re-enact the Apollo 11 mission. Jet, Sean, and Sydney portray the Apollo 11 astronauts, and Carrot and Mindy depict the people at Mission Control. In this re-enactment, Sean plays Neil Armstrong.
- The Apollo 11 mission appears in the 2016 season 1 episode "Space Race" of the NBC series Timeless. In the episode, Lucy, Wyatt, and Rufus travel to the day of the mission, July 20, 1969, to stop Garcia Flynn from interfering with the mission. After Flynn's helper, Anthony Bruhl, launches a modern-day virus against NASA, which prevents the staff from communicating with Neil Armstrong and Buzz Aldrin, Rufus and Lucy get help from Mathematician Katherine Johnson to stop the virus and Flynn before it is too late.
- The 2018 film First Man depicts Armstrong and Aldrin as they prepare for, and then accomplish, the Apollo 11 mission.
- The 2019 documentary Apollo 11 is a film by Todd Douglas Miller with restored footage of the 1969 event.
- 1969, a 2019 documentary series, devotes its first episode, "Moon Shot", to the Apollo 11 mission.
- "Moondust", the 2019 seventh episode of the third season of the Netflix series The Crown, includes extensive scenes of the British royal family watching the original BBC coverage of the Apollo 11 mission. It also includes a fictionalized portrayal of the private meeting of Prince Philip, Duke of Edinburgh, with the Apollo 11 crew during their visit to Buckingham Palace, and the prince's admiration for the Apollo astronauts.
- Chasing the Moon, a July 2019 PBS three-night six-hour documentary, directed by Robert Stone, examines the events leading up to the Apollo 11 mission, the mission itself, and its legacy.
- The 2023 film Indiana Jones and the Dial of Destiny takes place in 1969 and the New York parade for the Apollo 11 crew is directly related to the plot.
- The 2024 film Fly Me to the Moon focuses on the Apollo 11 mission, telling the fictional story of a marketing specialist tasked with filming a staged version of the Moon landing should the real one be unsuccessful. The scenes of the set for the staged version are very similar to the Bethpage moonscape from the CBS news portrayal.

=== Music ===
- The Byrds 1969 album Ballad of Easy Rider contains the song "Armstrong, Aldrin, and Collins" and uses the mission's countdown sequence.
- Thomas Bergersen's 2021 album Humanity, Chapter IV contains the song "Apollo", which includes two voiceover clips from President John F. Kennedy's 1962 "We choose to go to the Moon" speech and the mission's countdown sequence, as well as Neil Armstrong's "The Eagle has landed" near the end of the song.
- The song "Go" by the British group Public Service Broadcasting incorporates audio recordings from the Apollo 11 space flight. Their 2015 album The Race for Space includes the song.
- The instrumental track "Apollo XI" by the British band Orchestral Manoeuvres in the Dark (OMD) contains a sample from John F. Kennedy's "Landing a man on the Moon" speech and Apollo 11-related radio transmissions. Their eighth studio album, Sugar Tax (1991) contains the track, which was also used as the opener for their live shows supporting the album.

=== Video games ===
- In the Touhou Project series, the Apollo 11 crew's arrival and subsequent planting of the American flag on the lunar surface (hence 'claiming' it) is interpreted by the inhabitants of the Moon as an invasion, provoking the 'Lunar War'. The lunarians engage in acts of sabotage, by which they succeed in preventing humans from establishing a foothold on the Moon.
- Team Fortress 2's Pyromania Update Day 1's blogpost mentions the Apollo 11 mission was delayed by three years when Buzz Aldrin suplexed Neil Armstrong into a pile of folding chairs at an event called 'Astromania'.

== Folklore ==
Soon after the mission, conspiracy theories arose that the landing was a hoax, which are theories widely discounted by historians and scientists. It may have gained more popularity after the 1978 film Capricorn One portrayed a fictional NASA attempt to fake a landing on Mars.

There is a humorous and ribald urban legend that when Armstrong was a child, the wife of a neighbor named Gorsky, when asked by her husband to perform oral sex, had ridiculed him by saying "...when the kid next door walks on the Moon!" and then decades later while walking on the Moon, Armstrong supposedly said "Good luck, Mr. Gorsky". In 1995 Armstrong said he first heard the story in California when comedian Buddy Hackett told it as a joke. A short film based on the legend was released in 2011.

A Russian urban legend claims that Armstrong and Aldrin were both stranded on the Moon as their Lunar Module's engine malfunctioned. A naked Soviet cosmonaut, Profiri Yebenov, who was also stranded, helped the astronauts in repairing their Lunar Module, so that they can return to Earth safely. Cosmonaut Georgy Grechko asked Buzz Aldrin if the legend was real, Buzz denied the story and confirmed never encountering any human being on lunar surface during the Apollo 11 mission. Interestingly, "Yebenov" means "fucked" in Russian.

== Broadcasting ==
A 1970 United States congressional hearing noted that "all countries which had the technical capability of telecasting Apollo 11 live did so"; it also noted that coverage was mostly positive. The Apollo 11 mission received the most news coverage of all the Apollo missions and the television coverage for following missions dropped over time.

=== Australia ===
Australia played a major role in broadcasting the Moon landing, with the highest quality footage of the moonwalk being received by Australian stations.

Honeysuckle Creek pictures were used for the first eight minutes of Neil Armstrong's moonwalk, as the Parkes station did not have a clear view of the Moon. After eight minutes the Moon was in view for the Parkes station, which took over for the rest of the moonwalk.

=== United States ===
All three major American broadcast networks, CBS, NBC and ABC had live coverage of the Moon landing. In the United States, 94 percent of people watching television were tuned into the event. In 1969 most households had a television set at 94.8%. However of those homes which had one most were not color television sets. In Alaska, the landing of Apollo 11 was the first ever live satellite television broadcast in the state.

=== Western Europe ===
==== Britain ====
British television coverage of the Apollo 11 mission lasted from 16 to 24 July 1969 on all three UK television channels, BBC1, BBC2 and ITV. Most of the footage covering the event from a British perspective has now been wiped or lost.

==== Ireland ====
Footage of the launch was played on RTÉ. Live footage of the landing was played on RTÉ during the early hours of the morning with Kevin O'Kelley doing coverage of it by himself.

==== Italy ====
In Italy it was estimated 40 million people watched the Apollo 11 televised landing on the Moon according to a US government memo from the Director of the United States Information Service to US President Richard Nixon but in a 1970 US Congressional Report that contained a media report for July 21, 1969 it noted that 21 million saw the landing. Programs were broadcast on Telespazio and RAI about the Lunar landing with the RAI program featuring also a roundtable discussion between two anchors alongside guests like politicians, astronomers and physicists with their coverage of the landing.

=== New Zealand ===
By the time of the Apollo 11 mission in July 1969, the North and South Islands of New Zealand were each network-capable via microwave link, but the link over Cook Strait had not been completed, and there was no link between New Zealand and the outside world. Footage of the Moon landing was recorded on video tape at the Australian Broadcasting Commission's ABN-2 in Sydney, then rushed by an RNZAF English Electric Canberra to Wellington and WNTV1. To forward this to the South Island, the NZBC positioned one of its first outside broadcasting vans to beam the footage to a receiving dish across Cook Strait, from which it was forwarded through the recently commissioned South Island network.

=== Communist countries ===
When the Apollo 11 landing occurred some communist countries (Soviet Union, North Korea and the People's Republic of China) did not broadcast live television footage of it. Although the Soviet Union did not broadcast the news live, it did broadcast footage of the launch four hours later on "the main Soviet evening television news show" discussed the launch and played footage of it. Footage of the launch and the landing was broadcast in the Soviet Union.

Communist countries in Europe which covered the Moon landing on television live were: Yugoslavia, Romania, Bulgaria, Hungary, Poland and Czechoslovakia. Several radio stations in Eastern Europe interrupted their programming to announce the liftoff (Radio Prague, Budapest and Warsaw).

=== Africa ===
Morocco, Libya and Tunisia played live news coverage of the event on television.

=== India ===
Indian electronic media of that era was largely confined to radio. It is reported that the broadcasts were not synchronous with the Apollo 11 flight. For example, the AIR Madras radio service, which was relaying from the Voice of America’s commentary on the Apollo 11 take-off on 16 July, cut off its relay “exactly at 7pm. Whereas the take-off took place only at 7.02pm." The radio service instead switched to Thirai Ganam—a film songs programme.

=== Colombia ===
Both Colombian television channels (public, national Canal Nacional and private, local TV 9 Bogotá (Teletigre)) broadcast special programmes before, during and after the Moon landing, which was broadcast live during the night of 20 July 1969 (a holiday in Colombia since it was Independence Day):

- Teleoperación Luna was the special programming RTI Colombia led for Canal Nacional, with the participation of then public broadcaster Inravisión and public telecommunications company Telecom, the Colombian Air Force, the National University of Colombia and fellow programadoras Producciones Punch and Caracol TV. The network also broadcast the launch from Cape Canaveral live. Siblings Carlos, Julio Eduardo y Leopoldo Pinzón were in charge of these specials.
- Del hombre para el hombre was the special broadcast by local channel Teletigre, led by journalist Alfonso Castellanos with Julián Mora, with Teletigre's owner Consuelo Salgar de Montejo making live relays from the United States.

Caracol Radio, Colombia's largest radio network, also aired a series of special programmes with Eucario Bermúdez, José de Recasens and Samuel Ospina.

The special programming aired from 15 to 24 July 1969. Since at the time Colombia lacked a ground station to receive satellite signals (it would not have one until 1970 in Chocontá), both channels had to resort to their fellow Venezuelan television stations. The television signal of the Moon landing would travel from Houston to Bogotá via Cape Canaveral-Caracas-Maracaibo-Jurisdicciones (near Ábrego, Norte de Santander). Teletigre's owner Consuelo Salgar de Montejo had asked Inravisión permission to install a portable satellite station for then upcoming Apollo 12's Moon landing, request denied in August 1969. Some television sets were installed in public venues in cities like Bogotá for Colombians to watch the historic event.

=== Uruguay ===
In Uruguay, coverage of the Apollo 11 mission was declared to be of “general interest” by the government, allowing it to be broadcast on all free-to-air television channels. Teledoce, an affiliate of the American network ABC, had previously secured the official broadcasting rights for Uruguay and aired key stages of the mission, including the launch on July 16, 1969.

Channel 10 and Monte Carlo Televisión produced a joint broadcast hosted by journalists Carlos Giacosa, Barret Puig, and Víctor Hugo Pedroso. Their live coverage included both the lead-up to the mission and its aftermath, extending into the early hours of the morning, and featured a telephone interview with aerospace engineer Wernher von Braun. Despite lacking official rights, the “general interest” designation enabled both networks to broadcast the full mission.

The mission was also extensively covered by the print media, which followed its development closely and conducted street interviews with residents of Montevideo. El Día journalist Leonardo Guzmán was the only Uruguayan reporter present at NASA’s Kennedy Space Center during the mission.

=== South Vietnam and the Vietnam War ===
Live broadcasts of the moon landing were not available in South Vietnam at that time. For American troops, footage of it was played on the American Forces Vietnam Network which was taped on its radio station in Saigon and 8 television stations throughout Vietnam. The tapes were sent from the Philippines and sent to Saigon and to other stations beyond Saigon.

== See also ==
- Apollo in Real Time
- Apollo 11 anniversaries
- Eisenhower dollar
- Susan B. Anthony dollar
- Moon landings in fiction
