= Salgar (surname) =

Salgar is a surname. Notable people with the surname include:

- Consuelo Salgar (1928–2002), Colombian journalist, advertising executive, media entrepreneur, and politician
- Eustorgio Salgar (1831–1885), Colombian lawyer and general
