= Branch Rickey Award =

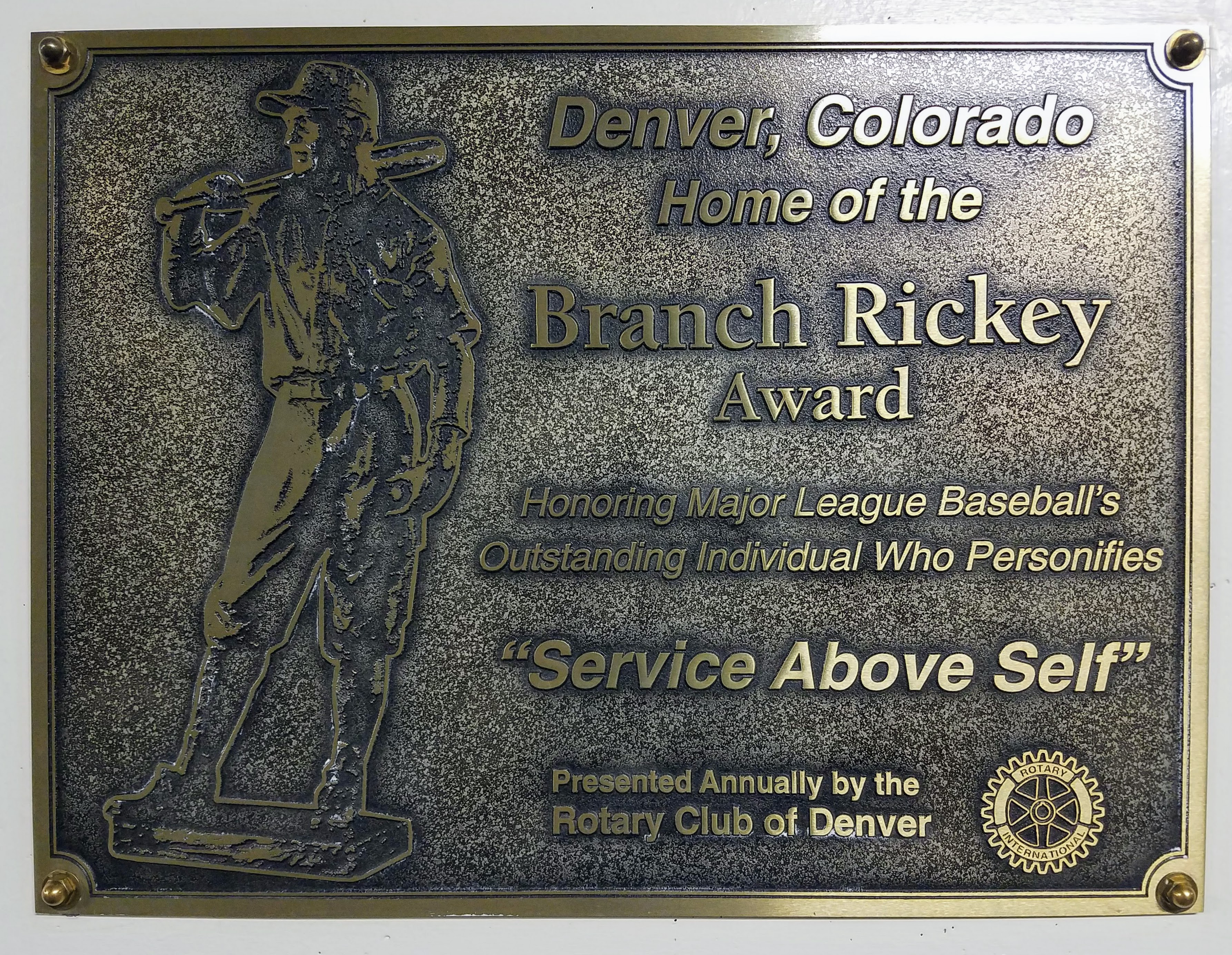
- A Branch Rickey Award plaque at Coors Field
- Location: Denver, Colorado
- Country: United States
- Presented by: Rotary Club of Denver

History
- First award: 1992
- Most recent: Anthony Rizzo, Chicago Cubs
- Website: The Branch Rickey Award

The Branch Rickey Award was given annually to an individual in Major League Baseball (MLB) in recognition of his exceptional community service from 1992 to 2014. The award was named in honor of former player and executive Branch Rickey, who broke the major league color barrier by signing Jackie Robinson, while president and general manager of the Brooklyn Dodgers. Rickey also created the Knothole Gang, a charity that allowed children to attend MLB games.

The award, created by the Rotary Club of Denver in 1991, was first awarded to Dave Winfield in 1992 at their annual banquet. Each MLB team nominates one individual who best exemplifies the Rotary Club motto: "Service Above Self". A vote is then conducted by the national selection committee, which consists of members of the sports media, previous winners of the award, and Rotary district governors in major league cities. Proceeds of the banquet benefit Denver Kids, Inc., a charity for at-risk students who attend Denver Public Schools. Each winner receives a bronze sculpture of a baseball player measuring 24 inches (610 mm), named "The Player", designed by sculptor George Lundeen. A larger version of "The Player", standing 13 feet (4.0 m) tall, was erected at Coors Field in Denver.

Winners of the Branch Rickey Award have undertaken different causes. Many winners, including Todd Stottlemyre, Jamie Moyer, John Smoltz, Torii Hunter, Vernon Wells, and Shane Victorino, worked with children in need. Stottlemyre visited and raised money for a nine-year-old girl who suffered from aplastic anemia and required a bone marrow transplant, while Moyer's foundation raised US$6 million to support underprivileged children. Other winners devoted their work to aiding individuals who had a specific illness, such as Curt Schilling, who raised money for amyotrophic lateral sclerosis, and Trevor Hoffman, who lost a kidney as an infant and devoted himself to working with individuals with nephropathy. Also, some winners devoted themselves to working with major disasters and tragedies. Bobby Valentine donated money to charities benefiting victims of the September 11 attacks, while Luis Gonzalez worked with survivors of Hurricane Katrina.

== Previous winners ==
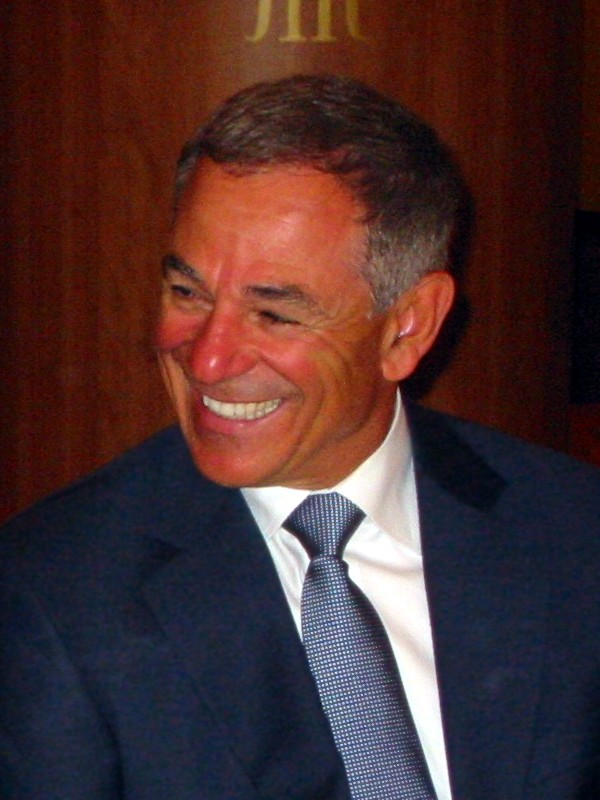
Bobby Valentine won the award in 2002 in recognition of his charitable work for the survivors of the September 11 attacks.

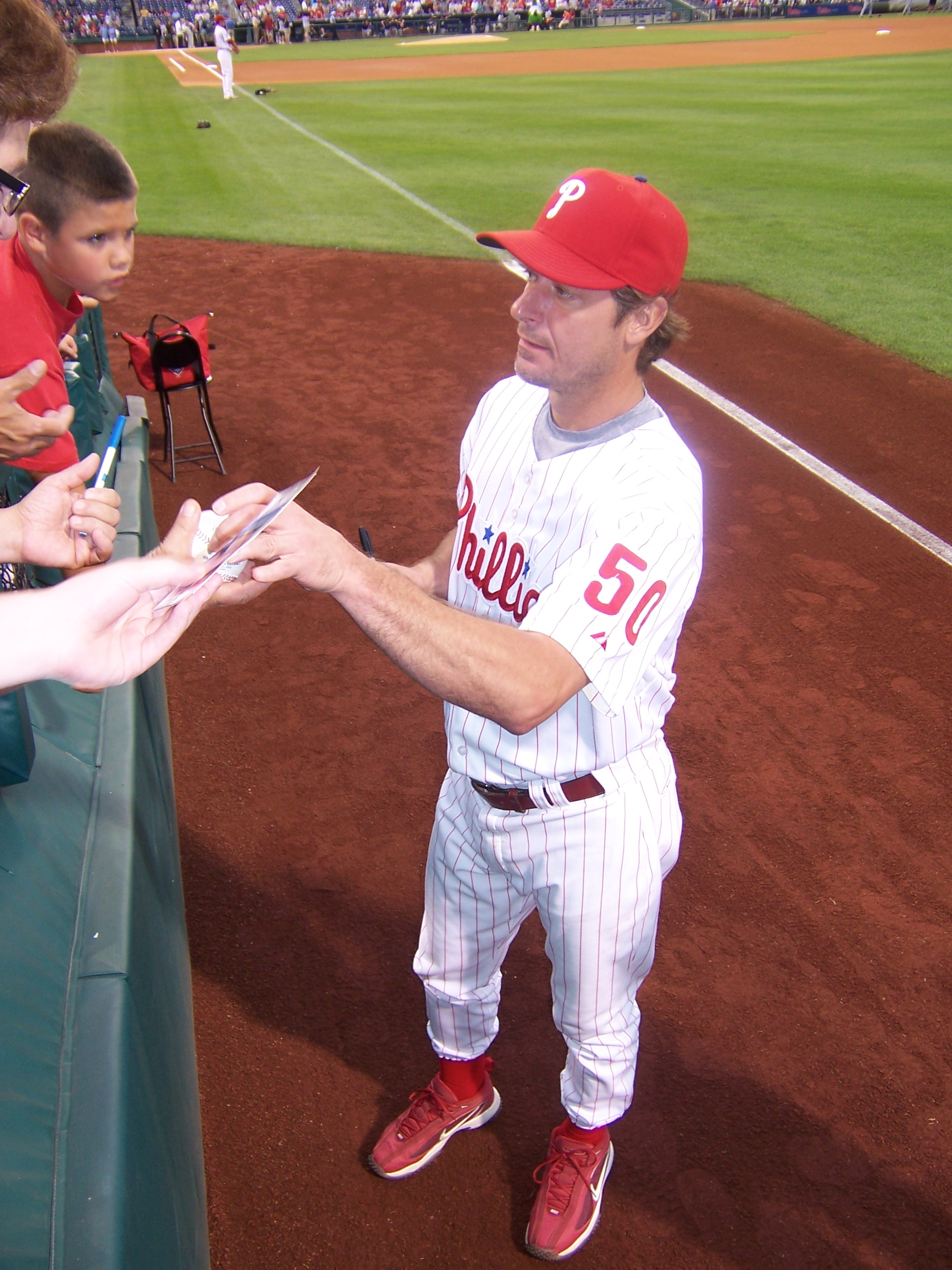
The Moyer Foundation, founded by Jamie Moyer and his wife, supports underprivileged children.

Key
†	Member of the Baseball Hall of Fame
‡	Denotes player who is still active

Year	Recipient	Team	Position	Ref
1992	Dave Winfield^{†}	Toronto Blue Jays	Outfielder	
1993	Kirby Puckett^{†}	Minnesota Twins	Outfielder	
1994	Ozzie Smith^{†}	St. Louis Cardinals	Shortstop	
1995	Tony Gwynn^{†}	San Diego Padres	Outfielder	
1996	Brett Butler	Los Angeles Dodgers	Outfielder	
1997	Craig Biggio^{†}	Houston Astros	Second baseman	
1998	Paul Molitor^{†}	Minnesota Twins	Designated hitter	
1999	Al Leiter	New York Mets	Pitcher	
2000	Todd Stottlemyre	Arizona Diamondbacks	Pitcher	
2001	Curt Schilling	Arizona Diamondbacks	Pitcher	
2002	Bobby Valentine	New York Mets	Manager	
2003	Roland Hemond	Chicago White Sox	General manager	
2004	Jamie Moyer	Seattle Mariners	Pitcher	
2005	Luis Gonzalez	Arizona Diamondbacks	Outfielder	
2006	Tommy Lasorda^{†}	Los Angeles Dodgers	Senior vice president	
2007	John Smoltz^{†}	Atlanta Braves	Pitcher	
2008	Trevor Hoffman^{†}	San Diego Padres	Pitcher	
2009	Torii Hunter	Los Angeles Angels of Anaheim	Outfielder	
2010	Vernon Wells	Toronto Blue Jays	Outfielder	
2011	Shane Victorino	Philadelphia Phillies	Outfielder	
2012	R. A. Dickey	New York Mets	Pitcher	
2013	Clayton Kershaw	Los Angeles Dodgers	Pitcher	
2014	Anthony Rizzo	Chicago Cubs	First baseman	

== See also ==
- Roberto Clemente Award
- Marvin Miller Man of the Year Award (Players Choice Awards)
- Bart Giamatti Award
- Lou Gehrig Memorial Award
- Baseball awards
- Cy Young Award
