= The Player (sculpture) =

Statue in Denver, Colorado, U.S.

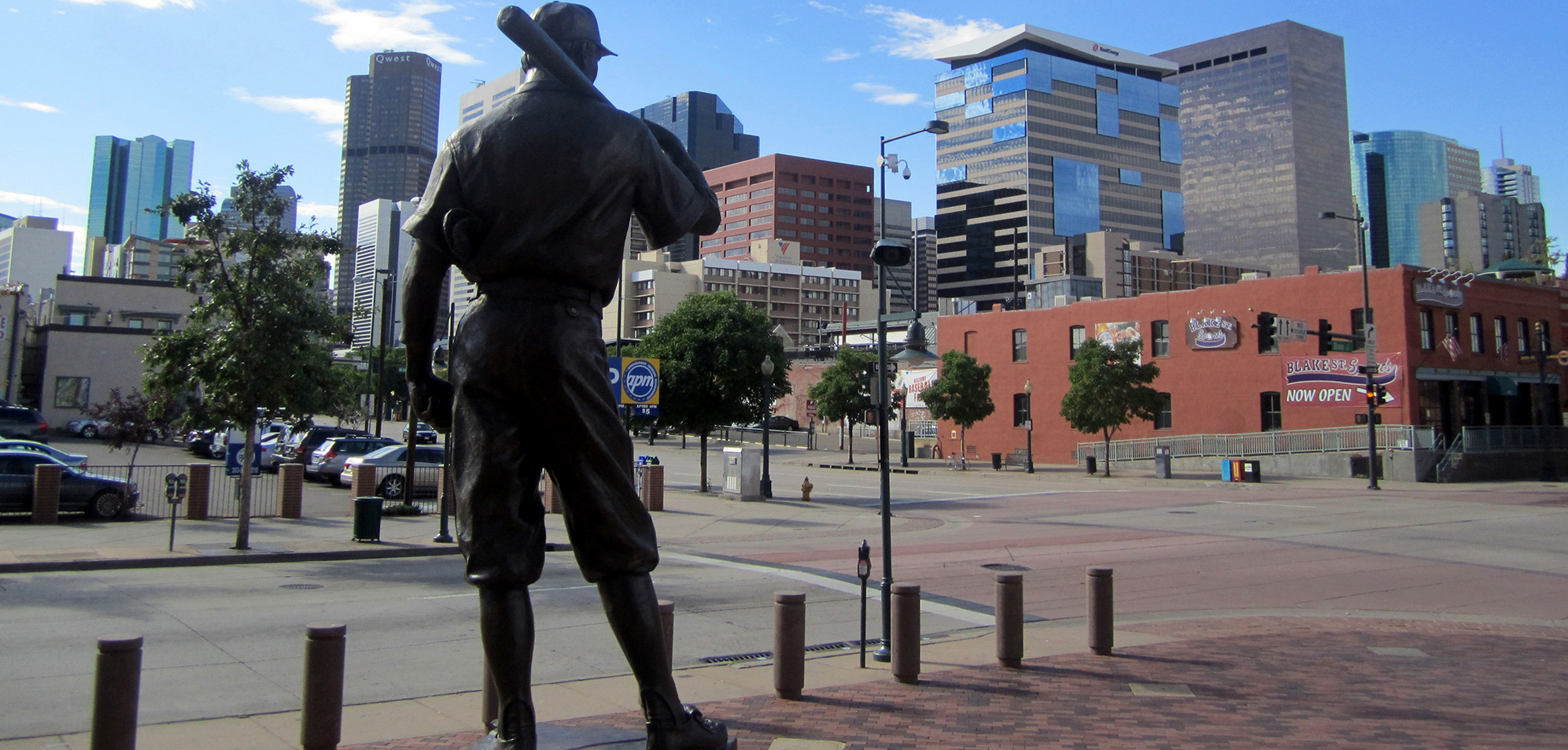
- Back of the statue at Coors Field
- Artist: George Lundeen
- Location: Denver, Colorado, U.S.
- Coordinates: 39°45′16.7″N 104°59′38.8″W

The Player is a 9-foot bronze sculpture installed outside Coors Field in Denver, Colorado, United States. It is a large version of the statue given to recipients of the annual Branch Rickey Award. It depicts a baseball player with a bat over his right shoulder. The Player was designed by American sculptor George Lundeen.
