= The Eagle Has Landed (statue) =

Statue in Brevard County, Florida, United States

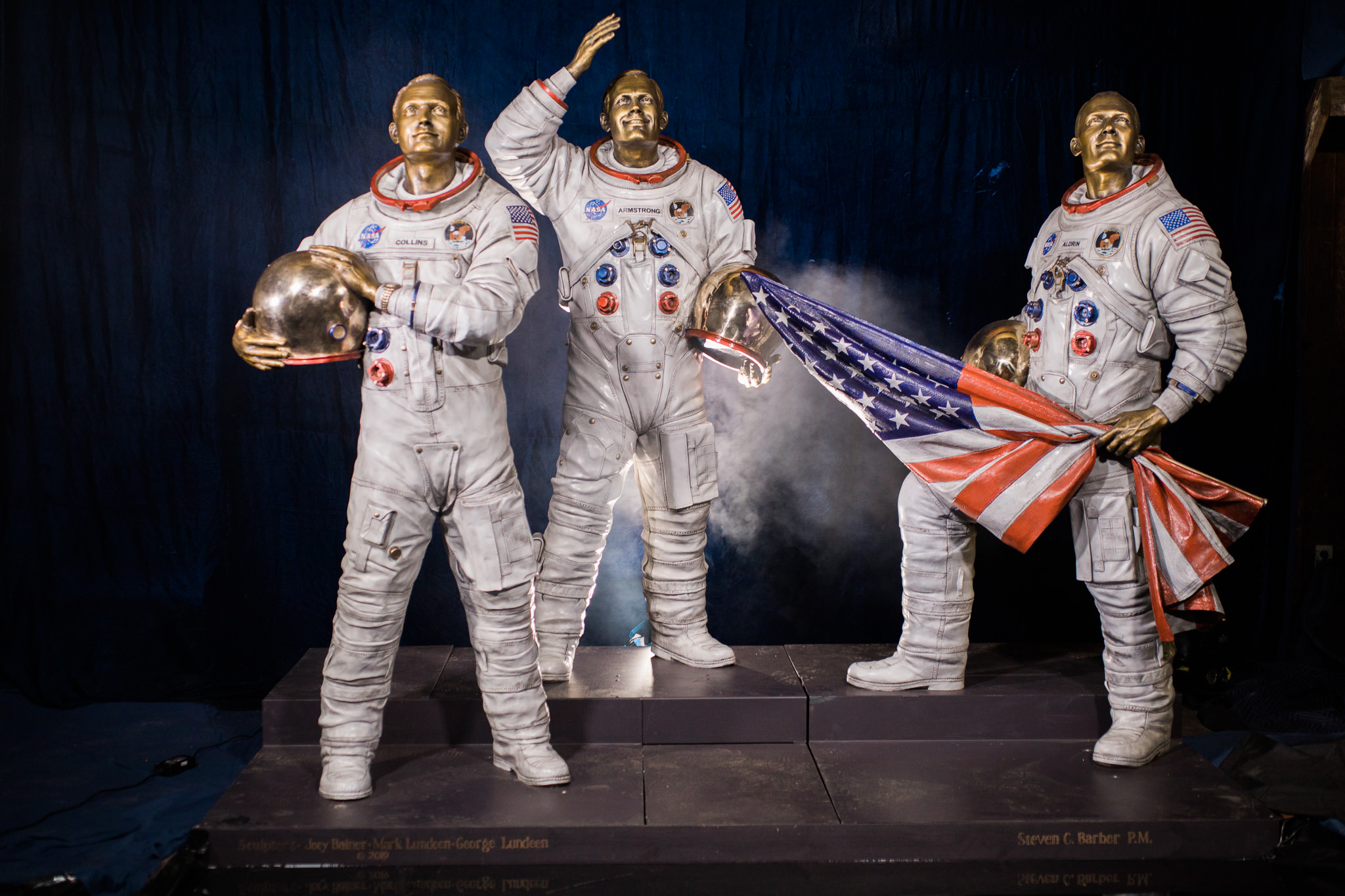
- The statues on display
- Interactive map of The Eagle Has Landed
- Location: Brevard County, Florida, United States
- Coordinates: 28°36′16.21″N 80°40′08.99″W
- Designer: George Lundeen; Mark Lundeen; Joey Bainer
- Type: Statue
- Material: Bronze, concrete
- Height: 13 ft (3.3 m) (total); 7 ft (2.1 m) (statue)
- Opening date: July 12, 2019
- Dedicated to: Neil Armstrong; Buzz Aldrin; Michael Collins

The Eagle Has Landed is a bronze sculpture in Brevard County, Florida, United States, in the Kennedy Space Center Visitor Complex. It is dedicated to the three Apollo 11 crewmembers: Michael Collins, who flew a lunar orbit in 1969 in the Command Module Columbia as Neil Armstrong and Buzz Aldrin flew the Lunar Module Eagle to become the first humans to walk on the Moon. The monument was designed by George Lundeen, Mark Lundeen, and Joey Bainer, and unveiled on July 12, 2019.

== History ==
The monument was first proposed by documentary filmmaker Steven Barber, and financed by Rocket Mortgage company, which donated it to the Kennedy Space Center Visitor Complex. The statue was made by George Lundeen, Mark Lundeen, and Joey Bainer in Loveland, Colorado. It was unveiled on July 12, 2019, as part of the celebrations of the 50th anniversary of Apollo 11 mission, which marked the first human landing on Moon on July 20, 1969.

The statue was placed in the Moon Tree Garden, a small park area near Apollo and Saturn V Center in the Kennedy Space Center Visitor Complex, near the city of Titusville, Florida. There were also planted 12 Moon trees, commemorating astronauts that have been on the Moon. The seeds were provided by Rosemary Roosa, daughter of Apollo 14 astronaut Stuart Roosa, and president and CEO of the non-profit Moon Tree Foundation. The foundation was created in honor of Roosa's father, who took various tree seeds with him on his space mission.

== Characteristics ==
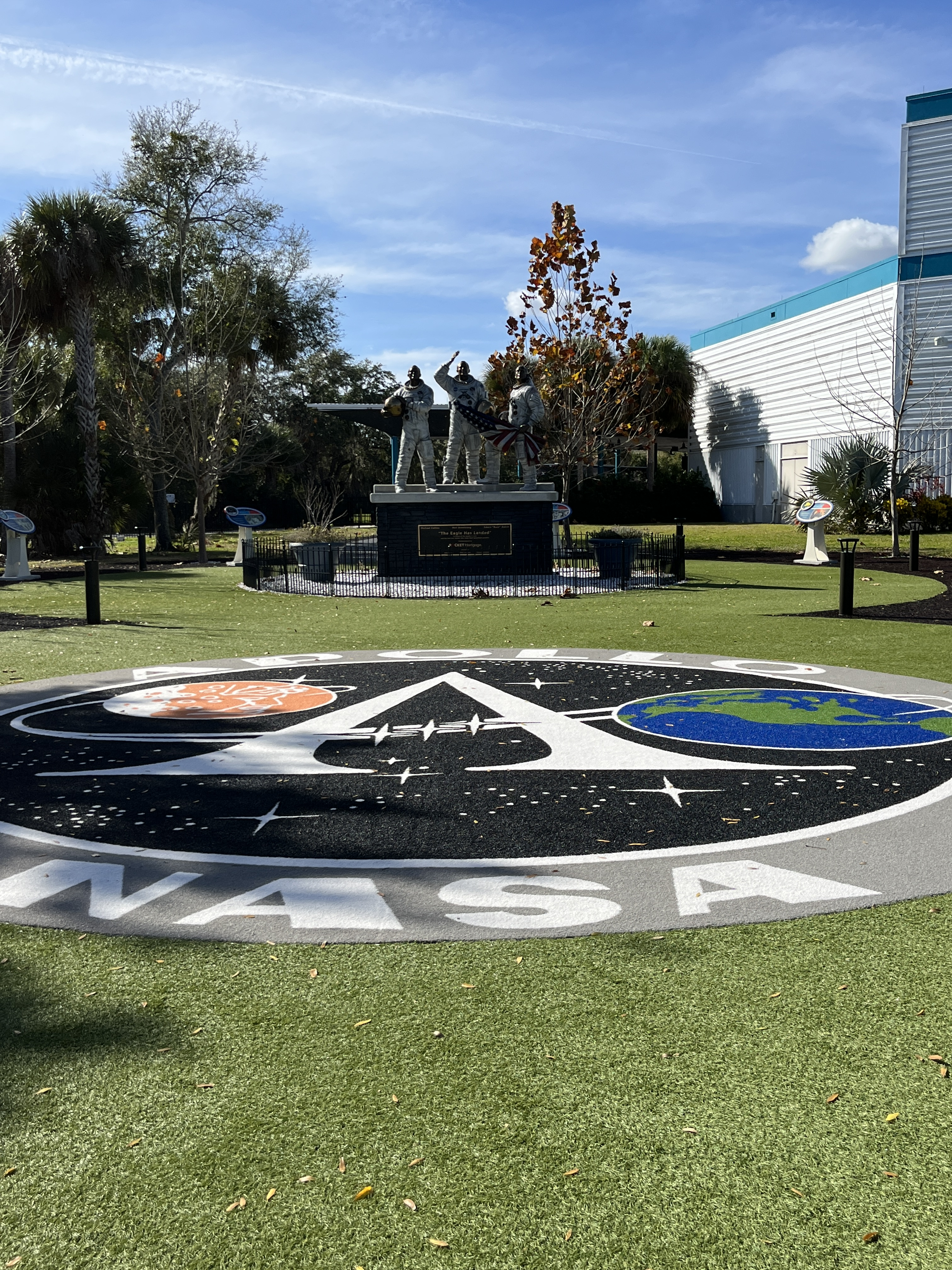
The monument in the Moon Tree Garden.

The monument consists of three bronze statues of Apollo 11 crewmembers, which are, from left to right, Michael Collins, Neil Armstrong, and Buzz Aldrin. They are depicted looking up to the sky, and wearing Apollo spacesuits painted the accurate colors. Collins and Armstrong are carrying their helmets, while Aldrin holds the flag of the United States. The figures are 7 feet (2.1 m) tall and set atop a 4-foot-tall (1.2 m) concrete pedestal, decorated with black stone bricks. The monument features a plaque with the inspiration: "In honor of Apollo 11 crew and the men and women who made their spaceflight possible".

The monument is placed in the Moon Tree Garden, a small park area near Apollo and Saturn V Center in the Kennedy Space Center Visitor Complex that includes 12 Moon trees planted there to commemorate the 12 astronauts who have walked on the Moon.

== See also ==
- Apollo 11 in popular culture
- Statue of Neil Armstrong (Los Angeles), 2013
