= Tele 9 Corazón =

Colombian television channel

- Country: Colombia
- Broadcast area: Bogotá

Ownership
- Owner: Inravisión

History
- Launched: 16 January 1971
- Replaced: Teletigre
- Closed: 31 December 1973
- Replaced by: Segunda Cadena

Tele 9 Corazón (Spanish: "Tele 9 Heart") was a Colombian local state-run television channel, whose signal only reached Bogotá and was broadcast on Channel 9. It replaced privately owned Teletigre.

The Colombian state gave time slots for programming on Tele 9 Corazón to companies RTI, Punch, Caracol TV, Protón, Alberto Dangond Uribe, Eduardo Ruiz Martínez, Jorge Barón, and Alberto Acosta, among others.

In 1973, Tele 9 Corazón was replaced by Segunda Cadena, which would become Colombia's second national television network. Bogotá would have a local channel again in 1997 when Canal Capital signed on. And also march 19, 1999 Bogotá would have a local channel again when Citytv signed on
