= George Lundeen =

American sculptor (born 1948)

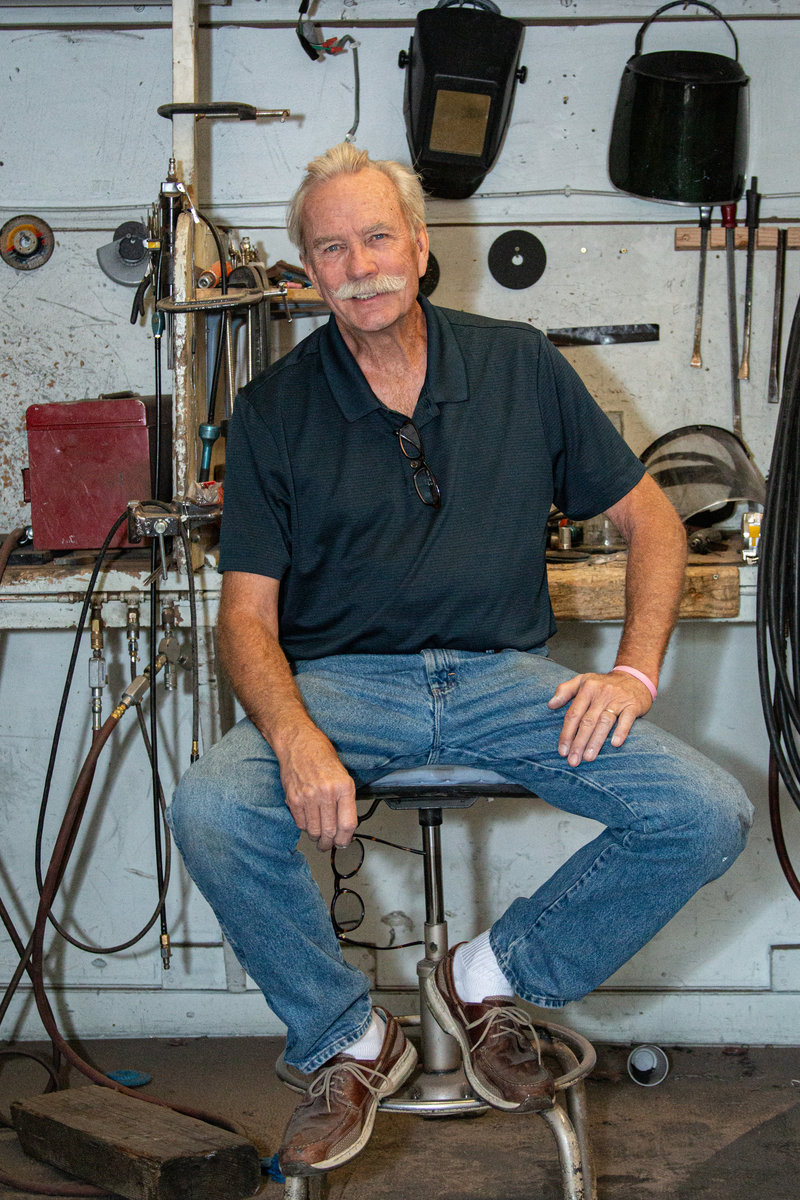
- George Lundeen in his workshop (c. 2000s)
- Born: 1948 (age 77–78); Holdrege, Nebraska
- Known for: Sculptor

George Wayne Lundeen (born 1948) is an American sculptor known for his bronze sculptures.

== Life and education ==
George Wayne Lundeen was born in 1948, and is a native of Holdrege, Nebraska. He is one of six children. He has degrees in art from Hastings College, Nebraska and the University of Illinois, and was a Fulbright-Hayes Scholar at the Accademia di Belle Arti di Firenze in Italy.

As of 2024, he lives and works in Loveland, Colorado, and is married to Cammie, also a sculptor, since 1988.

== Work ==
External videos
- Local artist captures moments in time through sculptures (3:08 min), 9News, retrieved 26 April 2025 – via YouTube

Lundeen founded a company, Lundeen Sculptures, in Loveland in 1976. He previously worked as a teacher and at foundries abroad and in the US. His younger brother Mark, also a sculptor, joined the company in 1981. As of 2022, it had around 30 employees. As of 2024, George and Mark own the company, and several employees are family members: Cammie, George's wife; Nelse, the company's accountant and brother of George and Mark; and Nelse's wife Bets, a sculptor. Four more family members are also employed. Along with traditional methods, the company also uses 3D scanning and 3D printing to create artworks.

Southwest Art said in 2011 that George Lundeen was "instrumental in turning Loveland into the sculpture capital of the West." According to the Denver Gazette, Lundeen Sculptures is one of the top bronze sculpture studios in the US. Many pieces by George, sometimes made together with Mark or the company's other sculptors, are displayed as public art or in museums, colleges, libraries and other places, for example at the John Deere World Headquarters. The pieces are often limited editions, and can be seen in several places. Two statues by George and Mark are included in the American National Statuary Hall Collection, representing Kansas and Colorado. Since the 2000s, the company has supplied bronzes to all the Scheels All Sports stores. Three busts by George are displayed in the Nebraska Hall of Fame.

== Selected artworks ==
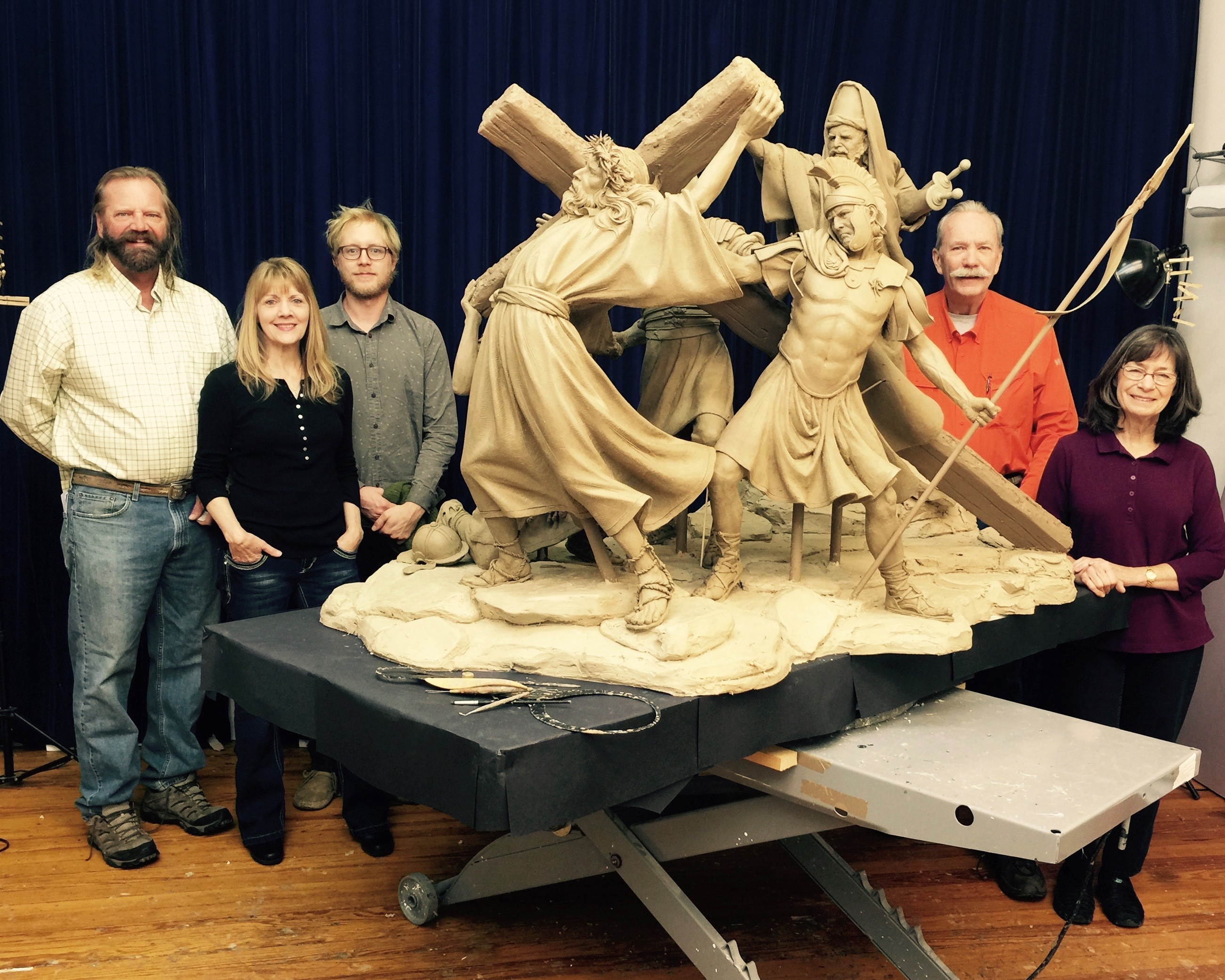
Clay model for the Stations of the Cross (Station 2), pictured left to right are Mark Lundeen, Bets Lundeen, Joey Bainer, George Lundeen and Anne LaRose

"Well, you have to realize that [bronze sculptures] aren't necessarily permanent. For instance, years ago I made a Thomas Jefferson and it ended up in quite a number of public places and universities. Now, a number of those have been taken out because Thomas Jefferson has come to be not quite as respected, you might say, as he once was. ... We had a Thomas Jefferson and a Ben Franklin taken out of a school in Kansas, and we called up a school in North Dakota and they said, 'Sure, we'll take them.'"

— George Lundeen, 2022

- Amelia Earhart at the National Statuary Hall Collection and the Amelia Earhart Hangar Museum. Amelia Earhart (born 1897, disappeared 1937) was an American aviation pioneer. The statue replaced one of Kansas senator John J. Ingalls.
- The Aviator at Denver International Airport and other places. Elrey Borge Jeppesen (1907–1996) was an American aviation pioneer, who created manuals and charts that enabled pilots to fly more safely.
- Benjamin Franklin (on a bench) at the University of Pennsylvania and other places. George Lundeen said in 2002 that "Ben Franklin is everywhere from Mexico to France to England, and quite a number of them are around the United States". It has become a tradition of students at the University of Pennsylvania to urinate on the statue, known as "Ben on a bench". The act is illegal and students have been fined for it.
- The Defiance Monument at the Trump International Golf Club in West Palm Beach, Florida. The statue depicts Donald Trump, 45th and 47th president of the United States. Its pose, with a raised fist, was inspired by pictures taken just after the attempted assassination of Trump in Pennsylvania in 2024.
- Departure in Greenwood Village, Colorado and other places. George Lundeen drew a sketch of a couple in an Italian train station, and the statue is based on this drawing. According to the Museum of Outdoor Arts, "The inclination towards travel is a universal instinct, and this sculpture nonetheless communicates the physical and emotional drive to move, grow, and inevitably change."
- The Eagle Has Landed in Brevard County, Florida, in the Kennedy Space Center Visitor Complex. It depicts the Apollo 11 crew members.
- Jack Swigert at the National Statuary Hall Collection and Denver International Airport. Jack Swigert (1931–1982) was an Apollo 13 astronaut, known for reporting "Okay, Houston ... we've had a problem here."
- The Joy of Music in Loveland and other places. This is a group of five figures, singing and playing music. George Lundeen modeled them on friends and family, and included himself, playing the bass.
- The Player at Coors Field, Denver. The statue is a tribute to baseball player and sports executive Branch Rickey (1881–1965), known for breaching the baseball color line in 1945 by signing player Jackie Robinson. A miniature of the statue is given to recipients of the Branch Rickey Award.
- Promise of the Prairie in Holdrege and other places. George Lundeen calls it the quintessential farm family. When asked in 2002 about what artworks he was particularly proud of, Promise of the Prairie was the first he mentioned. It was also one of his earliest economic successes.
- Robert Frost Sitting on a Park Bench at Hastings College. Robert Frost (1874–1963) was an American poet, the only poet to receive four Pulitzer Prizes for Poetry.
- The General Rose Monument in Denver, Lincoln Veterans Memorial Park. Maurice Rose (1899–1945) was an American major general who was killed in WWII.
- Sally Ride at the Cradle of Aviation Museum in Garden City, New York. Sally Ride (1951–2012) was the first American woman in space.
- Stations of the Cross at Cloisters on the Platte near Omaha, Nebraska. Sculptors from Lundeen Sculptures worked with several other studios on this artwork, consisting of several sculptures depicting the last days of Jesus' life, placed along a 2,500-foot-long walkway. The company also made similar sculptures for a church garden in Michigan.
- Storybooks at the Laramie County Library in Cheyenne, Wyoming, the Wagner College, Staten Island, New York and other places. It depicts a woman, a girl and a boy, sitting on a bench reading books.
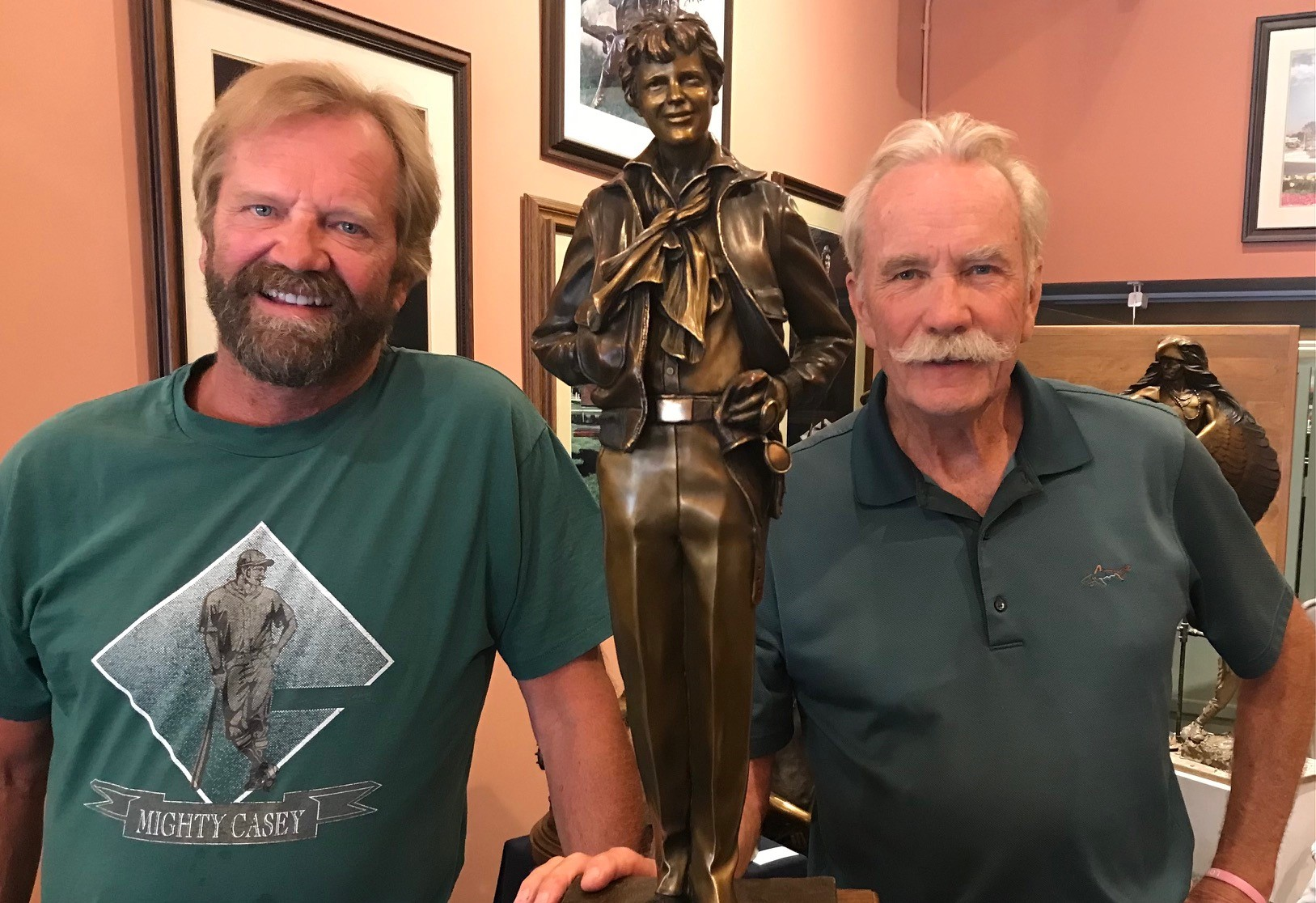
Mark and George Lundeen with a miniature of their Amelia Earhart statue at the National Statuary Hall Collection

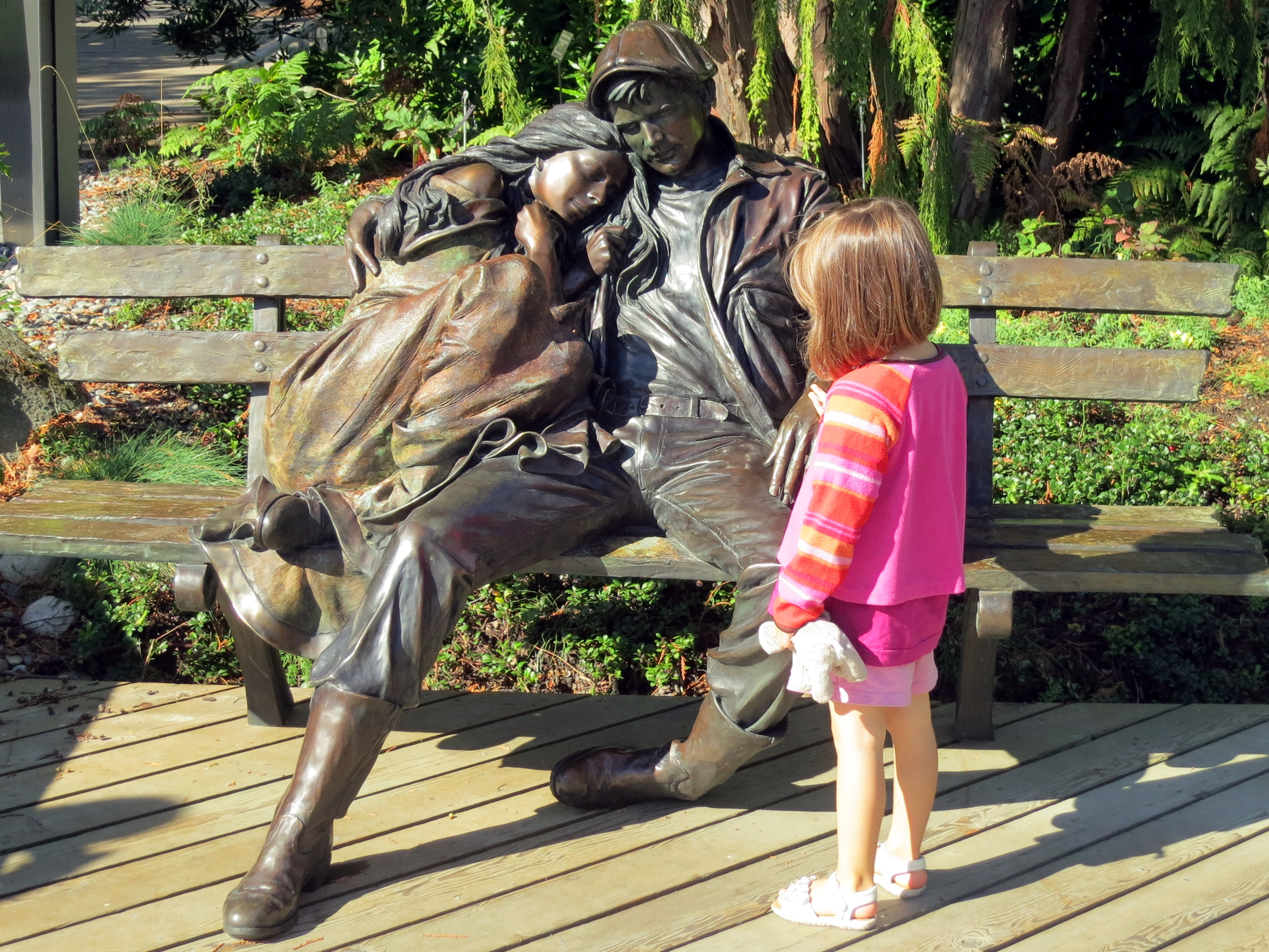
Departure in the VanDusen Botanical Garden, Vancouver, Canada

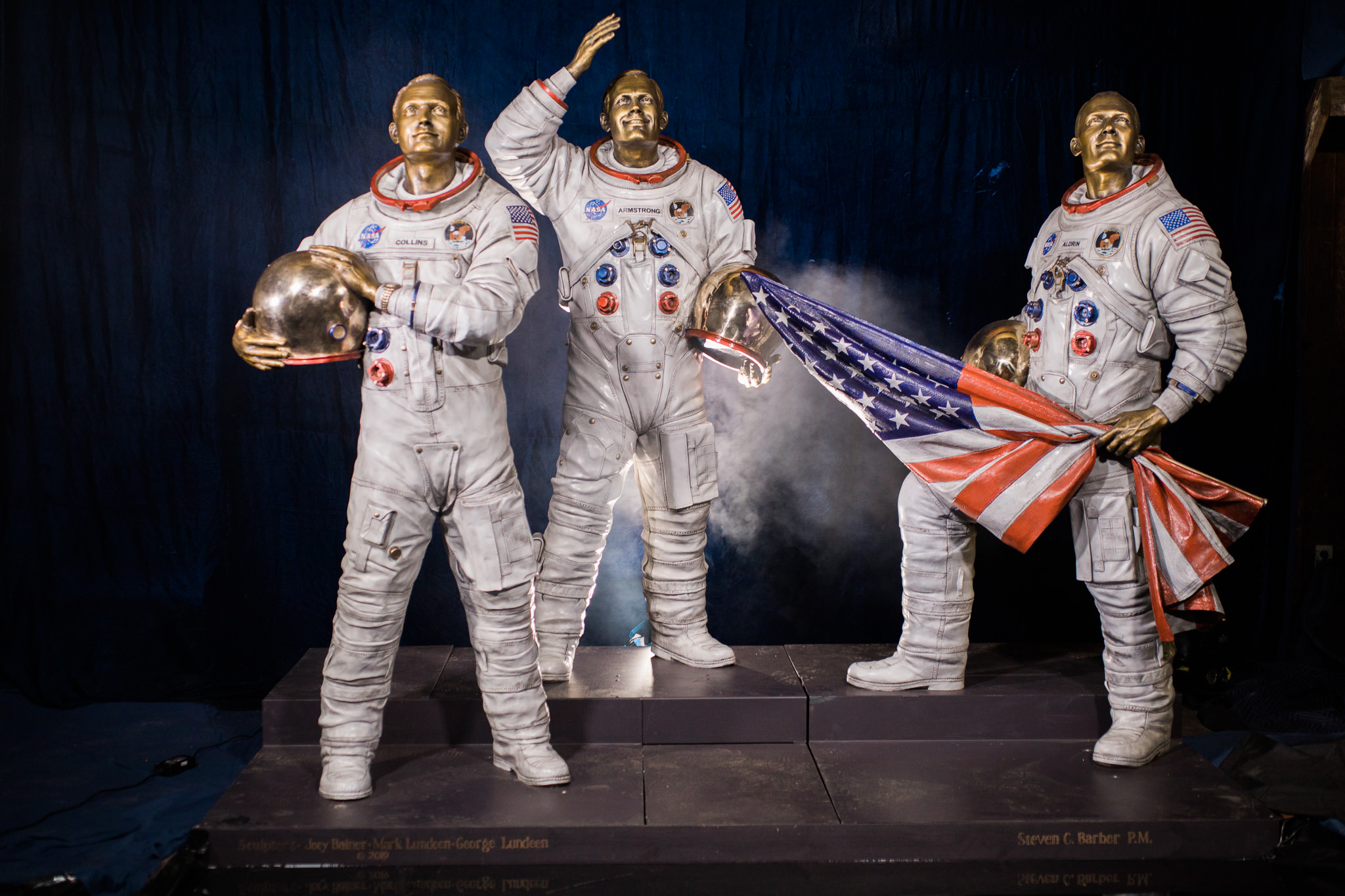
The Eagle Has Landed statues on display, by George Lundeen, Mark Lundeen and Joey Bainer

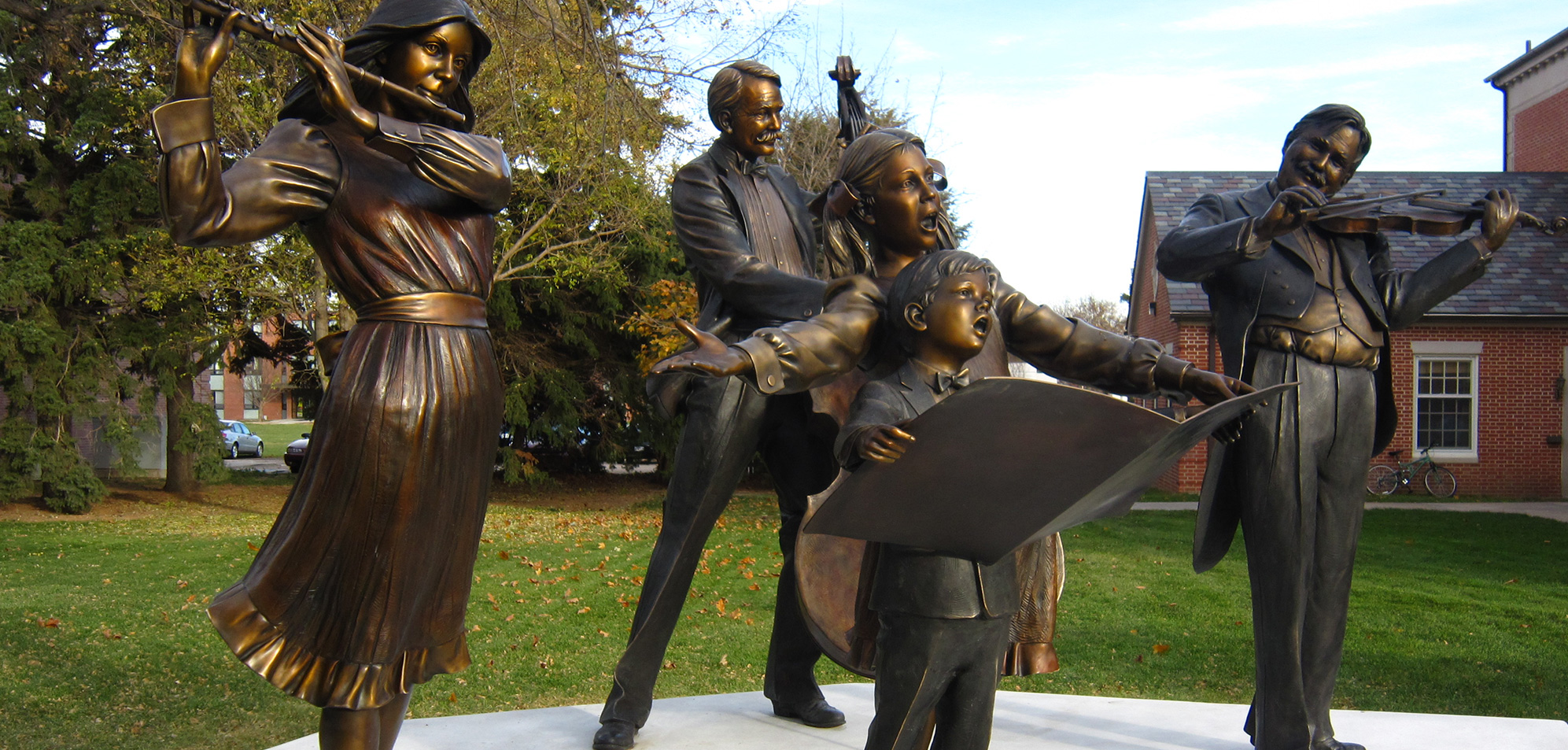
Joy of Music

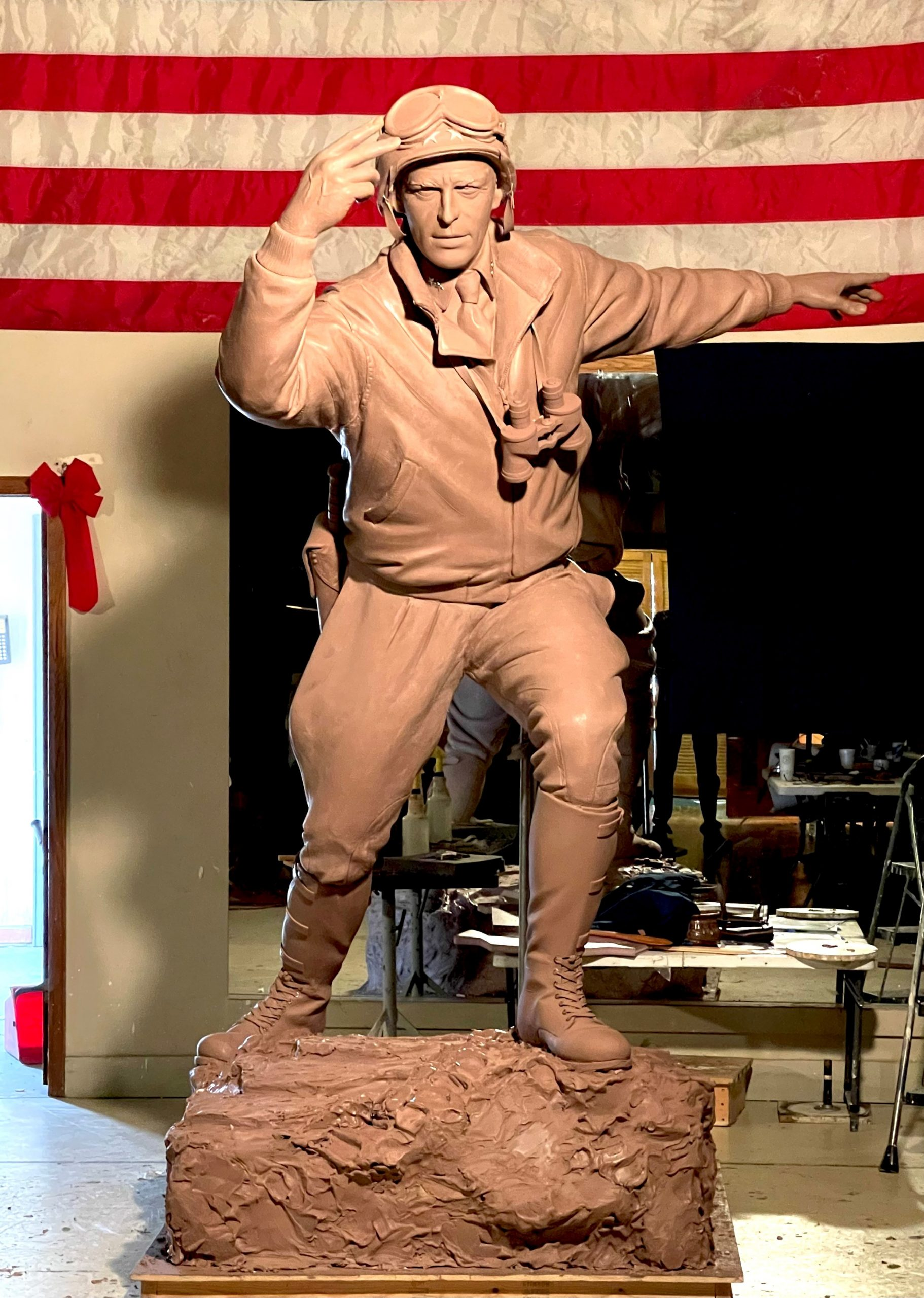
General Rose sculpture in clay

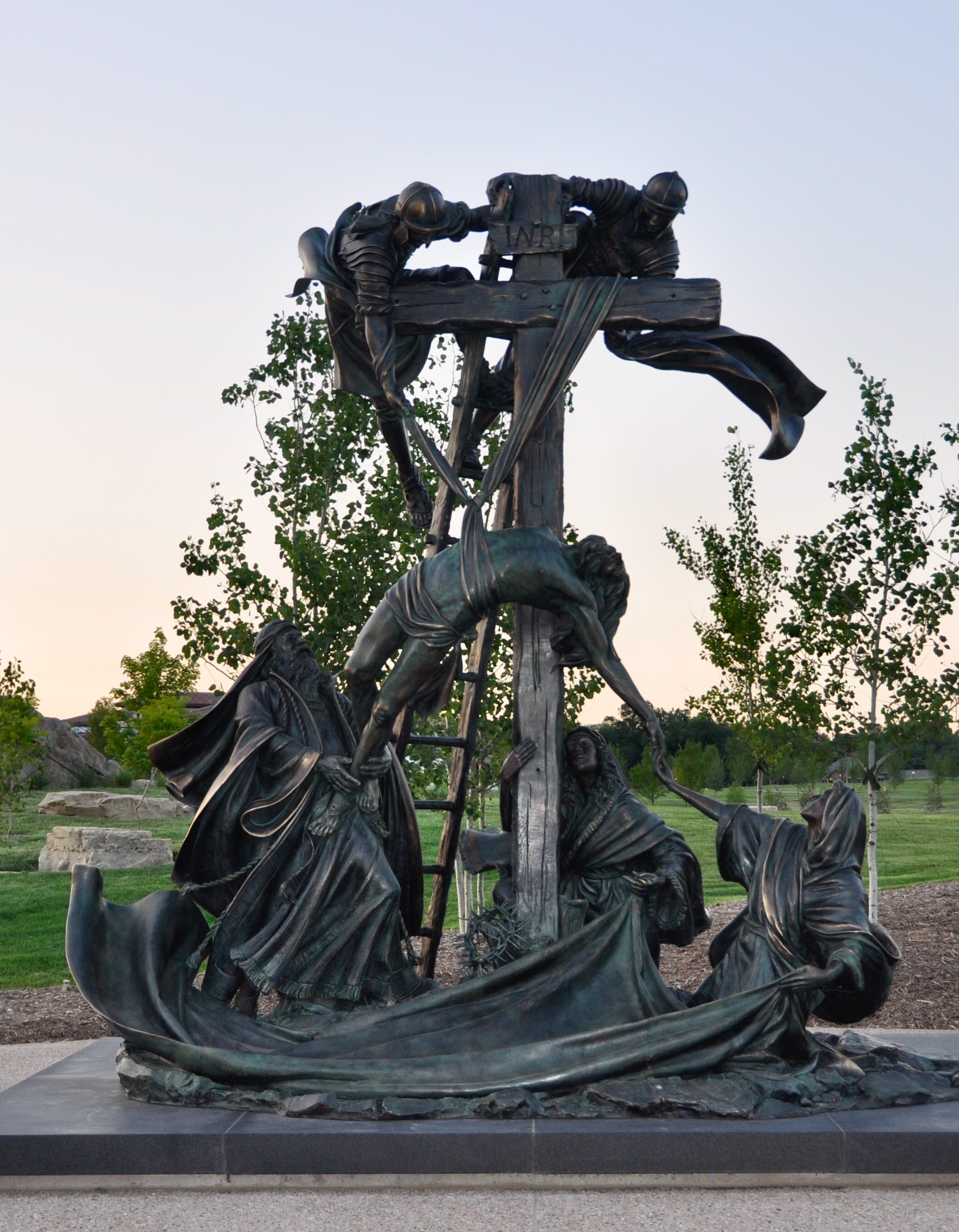
One of the Stations of the Cross sculptures (station 13) at the Cloisters on the Platte

== See also ==
- Jane DeDecker, former apprentice
