= Apollo in Real Time =

Interactive website of Apollo 11, 13, and 17

- Screenshot of the Apollo in Real Time web interface on March 13, 2026
- Website type: Interactive, multimedia
- Available in: English
- Creator: Ben Feist
- Website: apolloinrealtime.org
- Launched: 2015; 11 years ago
- Current status: Active

Apollo in Real Time is an interactive, multimedia website that presents the Apollo 11, Apollo 13, and Apollo 17 missions as they happened at the time by compiling and synchronizing thousands of hours of audio and video recordings, transcripts, and photographs. Apollo historian Ben Feist created the Apollo 11 and Apollo 17 real-time sites, and was a NASA contractor by the time he created the Apollo 13 real-time site. Air & Space magazine describes the Apollo 13 site as "one of the most ambitious multimedia history sites ever created".

Each of the real-time sites is fronted by a dashboard that provides options for different audio and video channels. Viewers can explore the multimedia properties, search the transcript, or experience the in-progress feed. Each media element is synchronized precisely (or as close as possible) to the actual mission time's master clock, Ground Elapsed Time.

== Apollo 17 ==
The Apollo 17 project, which Feist began in 2009 as a part-time hobby and launched six years later was the first real-time site published. It includes raw audio from the onboard voice and air-to-ground communication channels in Mission Control that had been released by NASA, and film that had been collected by archivist Stephen Slater in the UK. Apollo 17 in real-time contains 300 hours of audio, 22 hours of video, and 4200 photographs. The alpha version of the Apollo 17 site was released in March, 2015, and a reworked final version was released for the 43rd anniversary of Apollo 17 in December, 2015. For the 44th anniversary, additional content was added, including 3D renderings of Lunar Roving Vehicle traverses using data from the Goddard Space Flight Center.

== Apollo 11 ==
The Apollo 11 real-time site covers the period from 20 hours prior to launch until just after recovery, and includes 11,000 hours of Mission Control audio, 2,000 photographs, mission control and in flight film, and 240 hours of space to ground audio, as well as information on each of the lunar surface samples collected by Neil Armstrong and Buzz Aldrin. For the Apollo 11 project, about 50 audio channel recordings were included, enabling viewers to select among every control position in Mission Control and other communication loops, such as the Guidance officer, the capsule communicator, and the flight dynamics officer.

On the 50th anniversary of the Apollo 11 mission, Space.com simulcast the live feed from the Apollo 11 in real-time site.

== Apollo 13 ==
Gathering historical materials for the real-time site for Apollo 13 took a team of researchers eight months. Footage sourced includes all the mute 16mm film from Mission Control, supplied by Slater and synchronised to the audio wherever possible, and all the photos, film and television footage shot by the astronauts. The video and audio for the project were digitized and restored by a team of historians, researchers, and audio, film and visual experts. The Apollo 13 real-time site includes over 7,300 hours of audio and video. Apollo 13 in real-time includes four audio tapes from the time of the explosion that had been missing and were only recovered from the National Archives in the fall of 2019. It is the first time this audio has been heard since the 1970 accident investigation.

The Apollo 13 site launched on March 13, 2020, in time for the 50th anniversary of the launch in April 2020.

== ISS in Real Time ==
On October 27, 2025, Feist and fellow NASA contractor David Charney launched ISS in Real Time. The portal presents mission data, audio coverage, photos, articles, and videos, from the International Space Station over the past 25 years.

== See also ==
- Apollo 11 in popular culture
