= Alfonso Castellanos =

Colombian radio announcer and journalist (1934–2026)

- Born: Alfonso Castellanos Martínez; December 21, 1961; Málaga, Santander Department, Colombia
- Died: January 14, 2026 (aged 91); Santa Marta, Magdalena Department, Colombia
- Occupations: Journalist, announcer, and presenter
- Years active: 1941–2002
- Children: Juan Jacobo Castellanos

Alfonso Castellanos Martínez (Note: In this Hispanic American name, the first or paternal surname is Castellanos and the second or maternal family name is Martínez.) (December 21, 1934 – January 14, 2026) was a Colombian radio announcer, journalist and television presenter.

== Life and career ==
Castellanos was born in Málaga, department of Santander. At a very young age, he and his family moved to Bogotá due to the violence that plagued the country at the time (La Violencia). He began as a proofreader at the newspaper El Liberal, directed by Alberto Lleras Camargo. Later, he was a linotypist for the newspaper. From 1948 to 1953, he was a layout artist for El Nuevo Siglo.

He studied journalism in Spain on a scholarship arranged by Álvaro Gómez Hurtado and studied at the UPI news agency in the U.S. state of New York. He returned to the country as an editor and political journalist for El Nuevo Siglo, where he had previously worked. He worked for El Tiempo as a journalist directed by Roberto García-Peña.

Castellanos held the position of Secretary of Information and Press at the Casa de Nariño during the presidency of Alfonso López Michelsen. He broadcast for eleven hours covering the first moon landing during the Apollo 11 mission, which broke audience records at the time.

Among his journalistic work, he hosted programs on television and radio for RCN Radio, Teletigre, Noticias 1, Mundo al Vuelo, Suramericana, Enka, and Telecom, providing editorial support. In 1979, he joined the first team of the news program 6AM-9AM on Caracol Radio, along with Yamid Amat, Julio Nieto Bernal, and Antonio Pardo García. Founder and owner of the television production companies Intervisión (1979-1991) and Universal TV, later renamed UniTV (1985-2003), he hosted his independent program, Yo sé quién sabe lo que usted no sabe ("I Know Who Knows What You Don't Know"), which was characterized by its sensationalist style of presenting information.

In his later years, after retiring from journalism, he resided in Santa Marta, department of Magdalena, due to a heart condition. Castellanos died on January 14, 2026, at the age of 91.
