= Statue of Sally Ride =

Statue in East Garden City, New York, U.S.

Sally Ride
- Artist: George Lundeen, Mark Lundeen, and Joey Bainer
- Year: 2022
- Medium: Bronze and gold sculpture
- Subject: Sally Ride
- Location: Cradle of Aviation Museum; East Garden City, New York, U.S.; 40°43′41.1″N 73°35′50.6″W

Sally Ride is a sculpture and monument dedicated to NASA astronaut Sally Ride, located in East Garden City, on Long Island, in New York, United States.

== Description ==
The statue of Ride was installed outside the Cradle of Aviation Museum in East Garden City in 2022. Ride, the first American woman in space, is shown holding a model of a Space Shuttle orbiter in her right hand and pointing it skywards. She flew on the Space Shuttle Challenger twice, on mission STS-7 in 1983 and STS-41-G in 1984.

The statue, by George Lundeen, Mark Lundeen, and Joey Bainer, is seven feet tall.

=== Inscription ===
The plaque is inscribed:

SALLY RIDE
First American Woman in Space

Commissioned by
Matson Family Foundation
Peter Diamandis: on behalf of the XPRIZE Foundation
Maria Shriver

Project Manager: Steven C. Barber

Sculptors:
Mark Lundeen – Joey Bainer – George Lundeen

Dedicated
June 17, 2022

Cradle of Aviation Museum

== See also ==
- Statue of Thomas Jefferson (Hempstead, New York) – Another nearby sculpture, located at Hofstra University.
