= Statue of Neil Armstrong (Los Angeles) =

Statue in Los Angeles, California, United States

Neil Armstrong
- Interactive map of Neil Armstrong
- Location: Los Angeles, California, United States
- Coordinates: 34°01′12.54″N 118°17′18.84″W
- Designer: Jon Hair
- Type: Statue
- Material: Bronze
- Length: 8 ft (2.4 m)
- Opening date: August 2013
- Dedicated to: Neil Armstrong

Neil Armstrong is a bronze statue in Los Angeles, California, United States, located at campus of the University of Southern California, at the Epstein Family Plaza, near the intersection of Watt Way and Bloom Walk. It is dedicated to Neil Armstrong, a NASA astronaut and university alumnus who, as the member of the 1969 Apollo 11 mission, was the first person to walk on the Moon. It was designed by sculptor Jon Hair, and unveiled in August 2013.

== History ==
The statue was designed by sculptor Jon Hair, and unveiled in August 2013 at the campus of the University of Southern California, to which Armstrong attended. It was financed by Trojan League of Los Angeles.

== Characteristics ==
The monument is placed at the campus of the University of Southern California, at the Epstein Family Plaza, near the intersection of Watt Way and Bloom Walk, and the building of the USC Viterbi School of Engineering. It consists of a 8-feet-tall (2.44 m) tall bronze statue of Neil Armstrong, astronaut, who as a member of the Apollo 11 mission, was the first person to walk on the Moon. He is depicted wearing an Apollo spacesuit and holding his helmet in his arms, near his chest. The statue is placed on a small pedal with the following inspiration:

Neil Armstrong
USC alumnus
MS, Aerospace Engineering, 1970

American astronaut
First person to walk on the Moon, July 20, 1969
"That's one small step for (a) man
one giant leap for mankind"

A gift of the Trojan League of Los Angeles

Jon Hair, sculptor, 2013

== See also ==
- The Eagle Has Landed, 2019 statue
- Apollo 11 in popular culture
