= Cradle of Aviation Museum =

Coordinates: 40.7286°N 73.5976°W

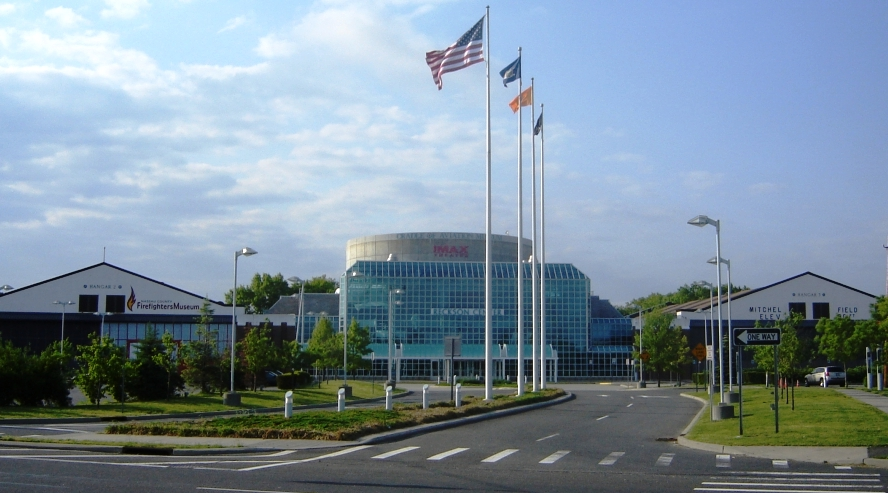

- Location within New York Location within the United States
- Location: Uniondale, New York
- Type: Aviation museum
- Founder: George C. Dade
- Curator: Joshua Stoff
- Public transit access: LIRR stations: Garden City, Mineola, Westbury
- Website: www.cradleofaviation.org

The Cradle of Aviation Museum is an aerospace museum located in the East Garden City section of Uniondale, New York on Long Island, established to commemorate Long Island's part in the history of aviation. It is located on land once part of Mitchel Air Force Base which, together with nearby Roosevelt Field and other airfields on the Hempstead Plains, was the site of many historic flights. So many seminal flights had occurred in the area that, by the mid-1920s, the cluster of airfields was already dubbed the "Cradle of Aviation", the origin of the museum's name.

Naming rights to the museum are held by Flagstar Bank.

== Long Island – The Cradle of Aviation ==
Aviation firsts that contributed to Long Island's nickname – the "Cradle of Aviation":

- 1873 – First recorded flight over the island, a balloon piloted by W. H. Donaldson from Brooklyn to Queens Village.
- 1874 – More balloon flights, New York City to Lynbrook and Lynbrook to Hempstead.
- 1909 – Glenn Curtiss flies a plane 25 miles from Mineola and wins the Scientific American Prize.
- 1910 – The International Aerial Tournament is held at Belmont Park.
- 1911 – Cal Rodgers makes the first transcontinental airplane flight from Sheepshead Bay to California in the Vin Fiz Flyer.
- 1917 – First flight of pilotless aircraft, the Sperry Aerial Torpedo.
- 1919 – First transatlantic flight by any aircraft, via airplane (US Navy NC-4 (flying boat)) from NAS Rockaway, Long Island, and arrived at Plymouth England, via stops in Massachusetts, Newfoundland, the Azores, and Portugal.
- 1919 – First transatlantic crossing by an airship (R34 (airship)) which arrives at Roosevelt Field from England.
- 1923 – First non-stop transcontinental airplane flight from Mitchel Field to San Diego, CA by John A. Macready and Oakley G. Kelly.
- 1924 – First round-the-world flight arrives at Mitchel Field.
- 1927 – First solo transatlantic flight by Charles Lindbergh from Roosevelt Field to Paris, France.
- 1927 – First transatlantic passenger flight by Clarence D. Chamberlin from Roosevelt Field to Eisleben, Germany.
- 1929 – First "blind" instrument flight by Jimmy Doolittle at Mitchel Field. Instruments developed by the Sperry and Kollsman companies of Long Island.

The Cradle of Aviation Museum's first curator, William K. Kaiser, participated in an aviation first as one of the pilots on the first transatlantic crossing of non-rigid airships in 1944 as a young ensign in the United States Navy. For his educational contributions and curatorial work at the Cradle of Aviation Museum, Kaiser was named a Jimmy Doolittle Fellow and an Ira Eaker Fellow by the Air Force Association Aerospace Education Foundation in 1986.

== Museum origins ==
The first Cradle of Aviation Museum Newsletters were published periodically by the Friends of Nassau County Museum when the air museum itself was still just a dream of Kaiser and George C. Dade, the museum's first director. Along with Henry Anholzer of Pan American Airlines and a team of volunteers, they acquired and restored numerous aircraft. These aircraft reflected some of Long Island's aviation firsts and its local aerospace industry. The first acquisition was a World War I Curtiss JN-4D discovered in an Iowa pig barn by Dade in 1973. Apparently, Lindbergh later confirmed that this was his very first airplane. According to their Spring 1979 newsletter, the museum also had a Ryan Brougham (sister ship of the Spirit of St. Louis), Republic P-47N Thunderbolt, Republic Seabee, Grumman F-11A Tiger, and a Grumman Lunar Module spacecraft. These aircraft were destined to occupy hangars 3 and 4 of Mitchel Air Force Base which was acquired by Nassau County when the base closed in 1961. The museum originally opened with just a handful of aircraft in the un-restored hangars in 1980. A major renovation and expansion program in the late 1990s allowed the museum to re-open in a state-of-the-art facility in 2002.

== Aircraft ==
Today the museum contains over 70 aircraft and scale models of airplanes from various time periods, including Charles Lindbergh's Curtiss Jenny in which he barnstormed, the A-10 Thunderbolt II and Grumman F-14 Tomcat and an unused Apollo Lunar Module, LM-13. LM-13 was scheduled to land on the Moon with the Apollo 19 mission, but the mission was cancelled and it remained on Earth, close to its birthplace in the Grumman Aircraft Engineering Corporation facility in nearby Bethpage, New York.

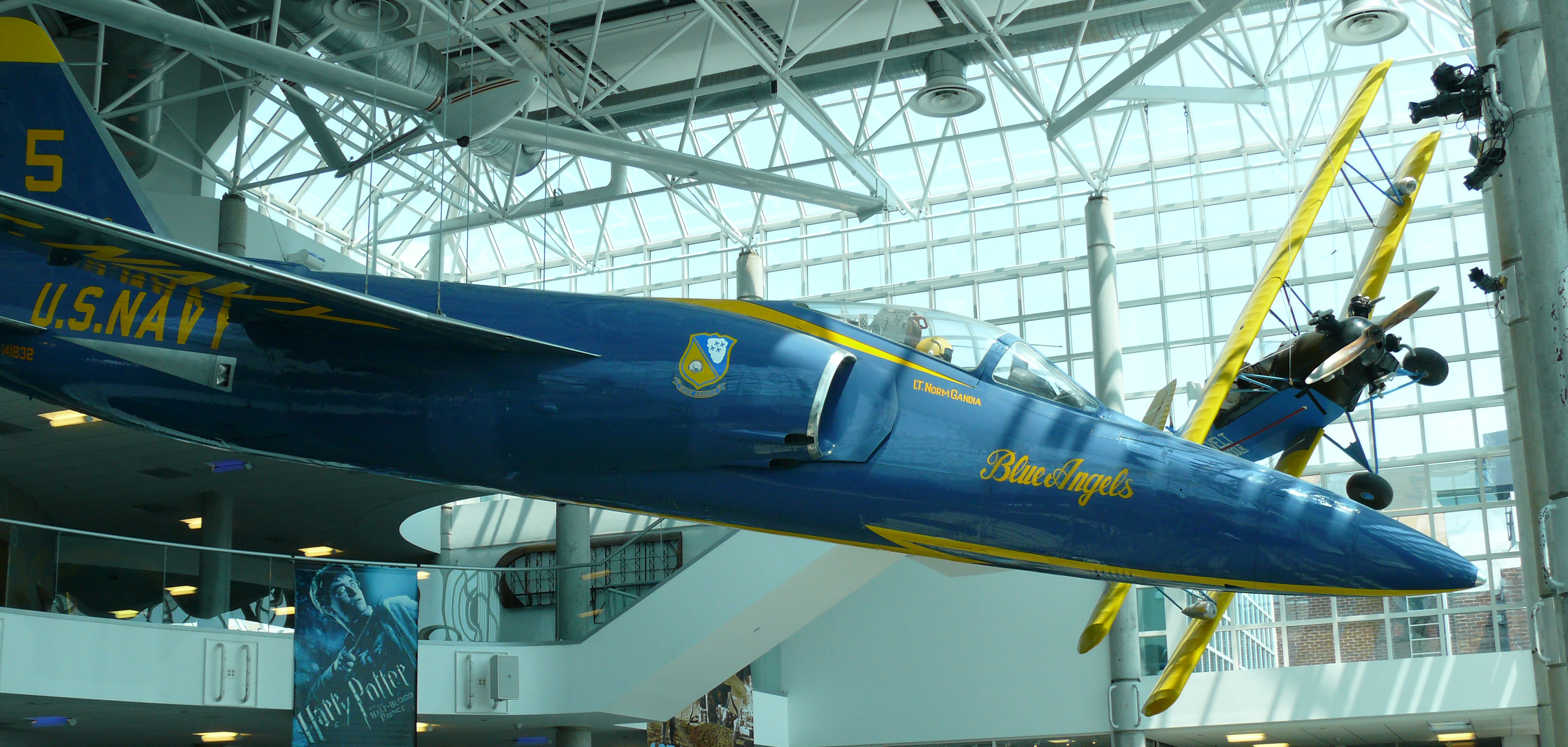
Lobby of the Museum with Grumman F-11F and Fleet Model 2 biplane

Many of the tour guides and restoration workers formerly worked at Grumman, which contributed much to the museum. The museum consists of eight chronological galleries with an approximately equal number of aircraft in each gallery. It is one of the only museums in the United States to cover all aspects of aviation/space history including pioneer aircraft, Golden Age aircraft, warbirds, civil, general, commercial and jet aircraft as well as spacecraft

The museum is one of the more popular Air and Space museums in the United States and has installations that include audio-visual, and unique hands-on and interactive exhibits, including a 'cockpit trail' where visitors can sit in an aircraft cockpit from each era. The museum's longtime curator is Joshua Stoff.

== Firefighter Museum ==
The Nassau County Firefighter's Museum and Education Center is also located in the museum.

== Gallery ==
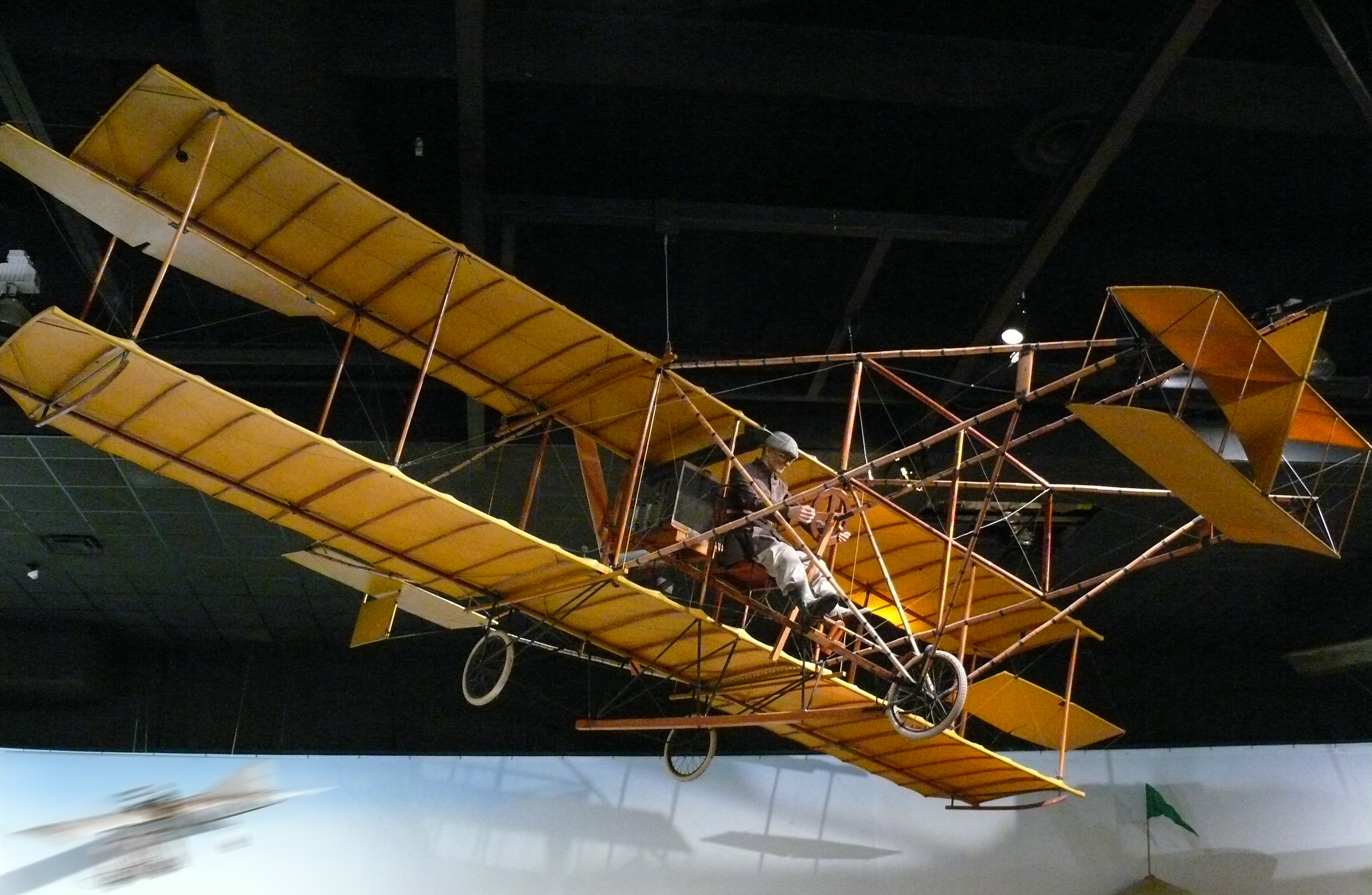
Curtiss Golden Flyer replica

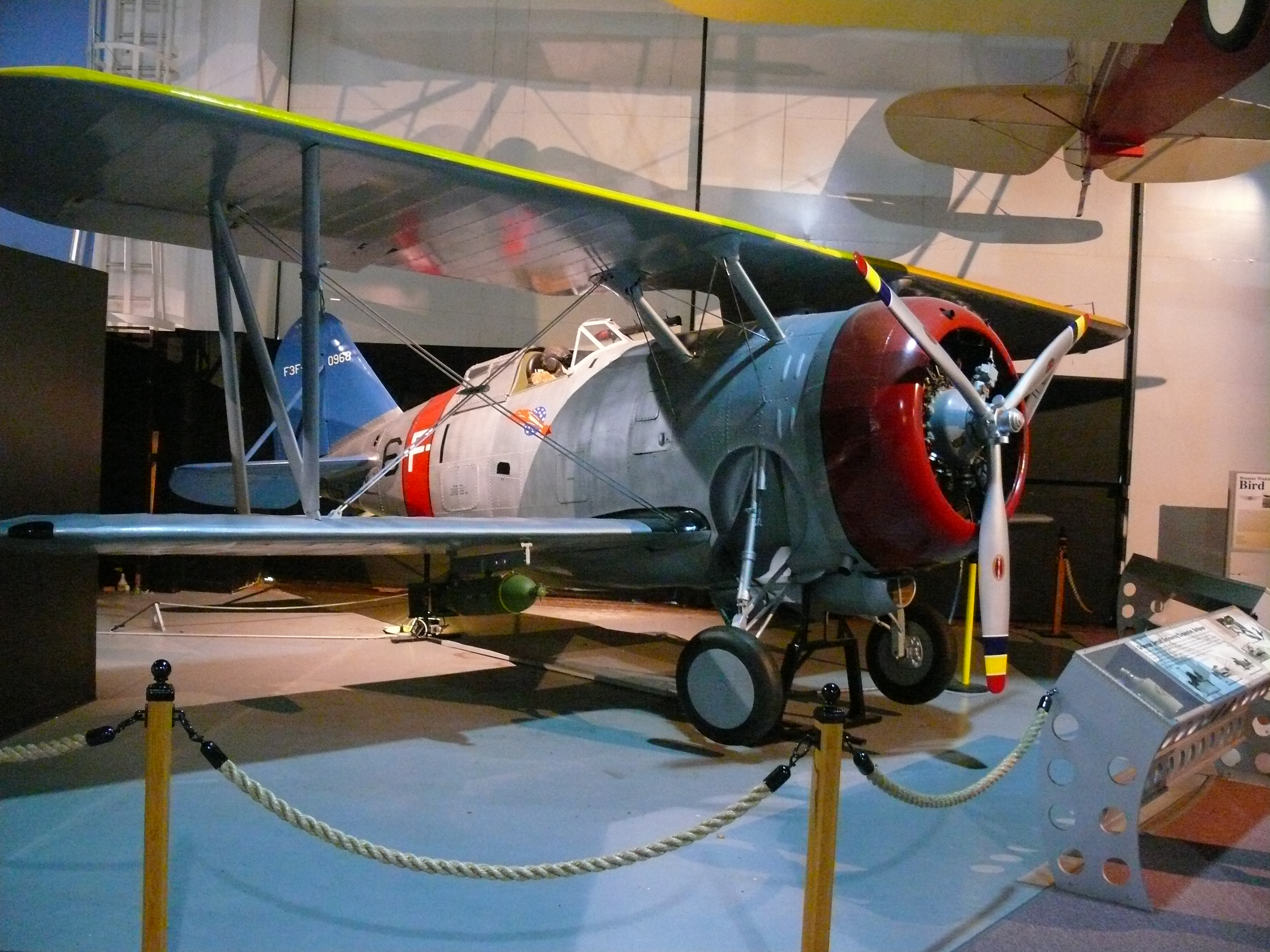
Grumman F3F-2

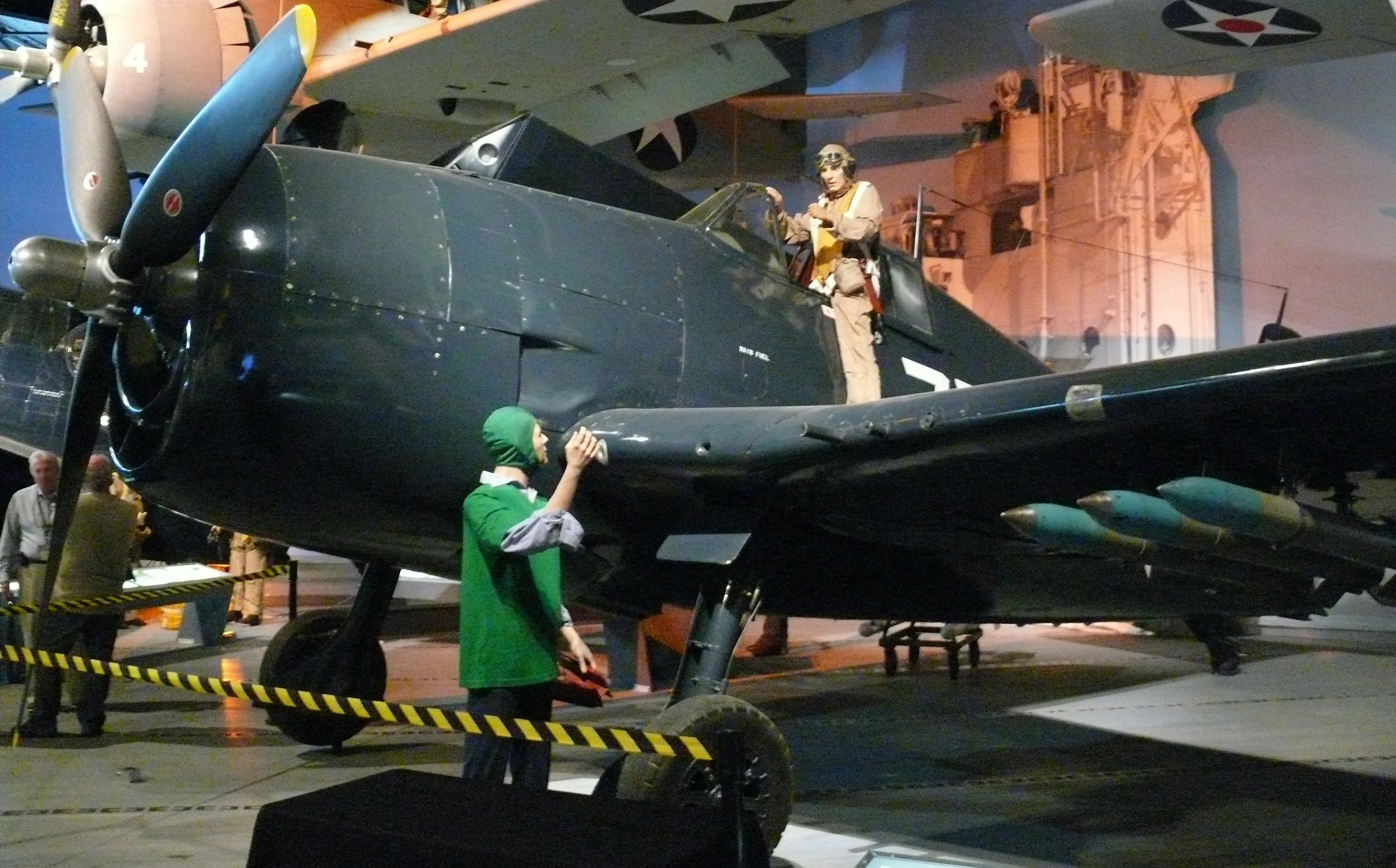
Grumman F6F Hellcat

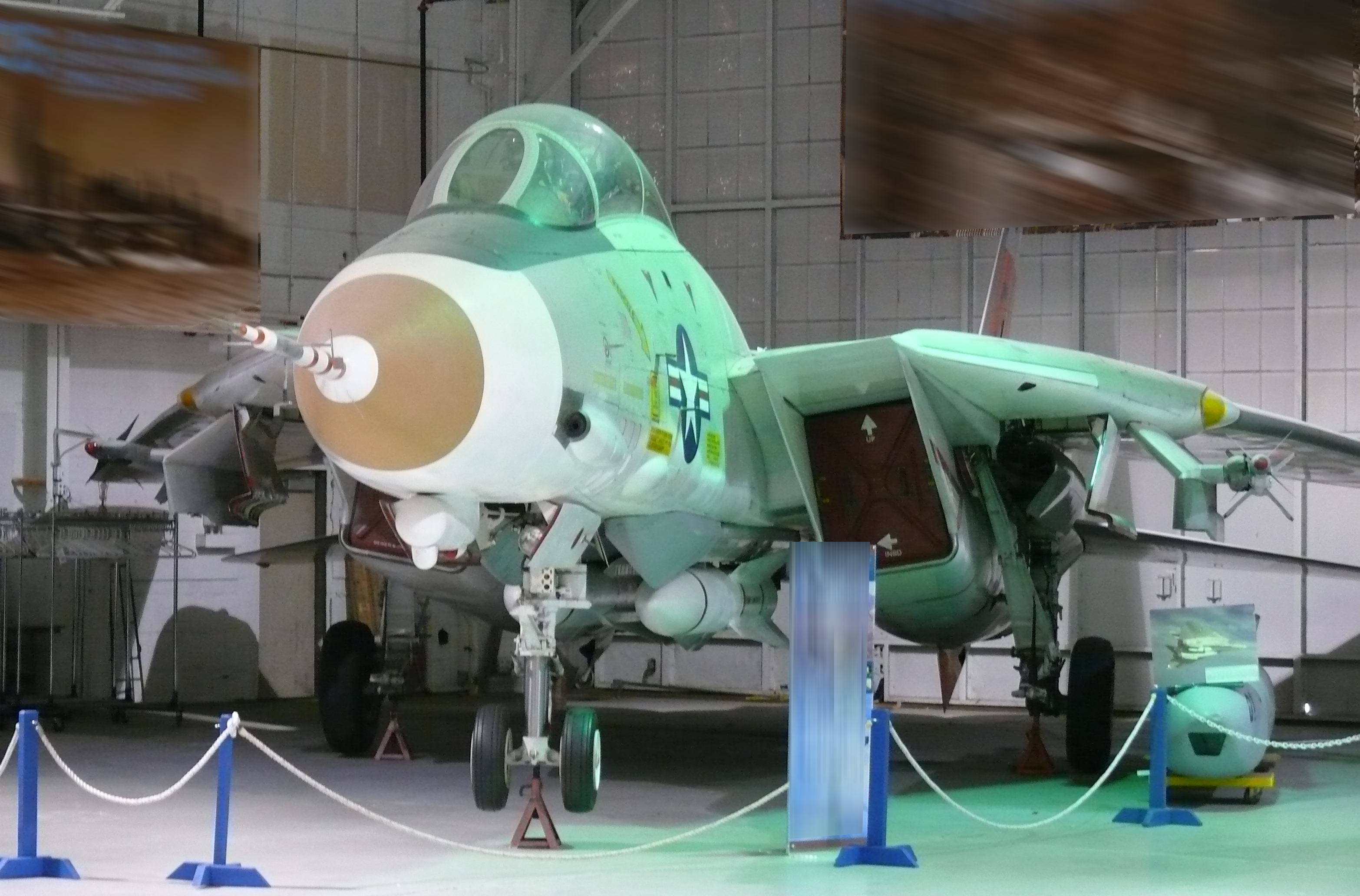
Grumman F-14 Tomcat

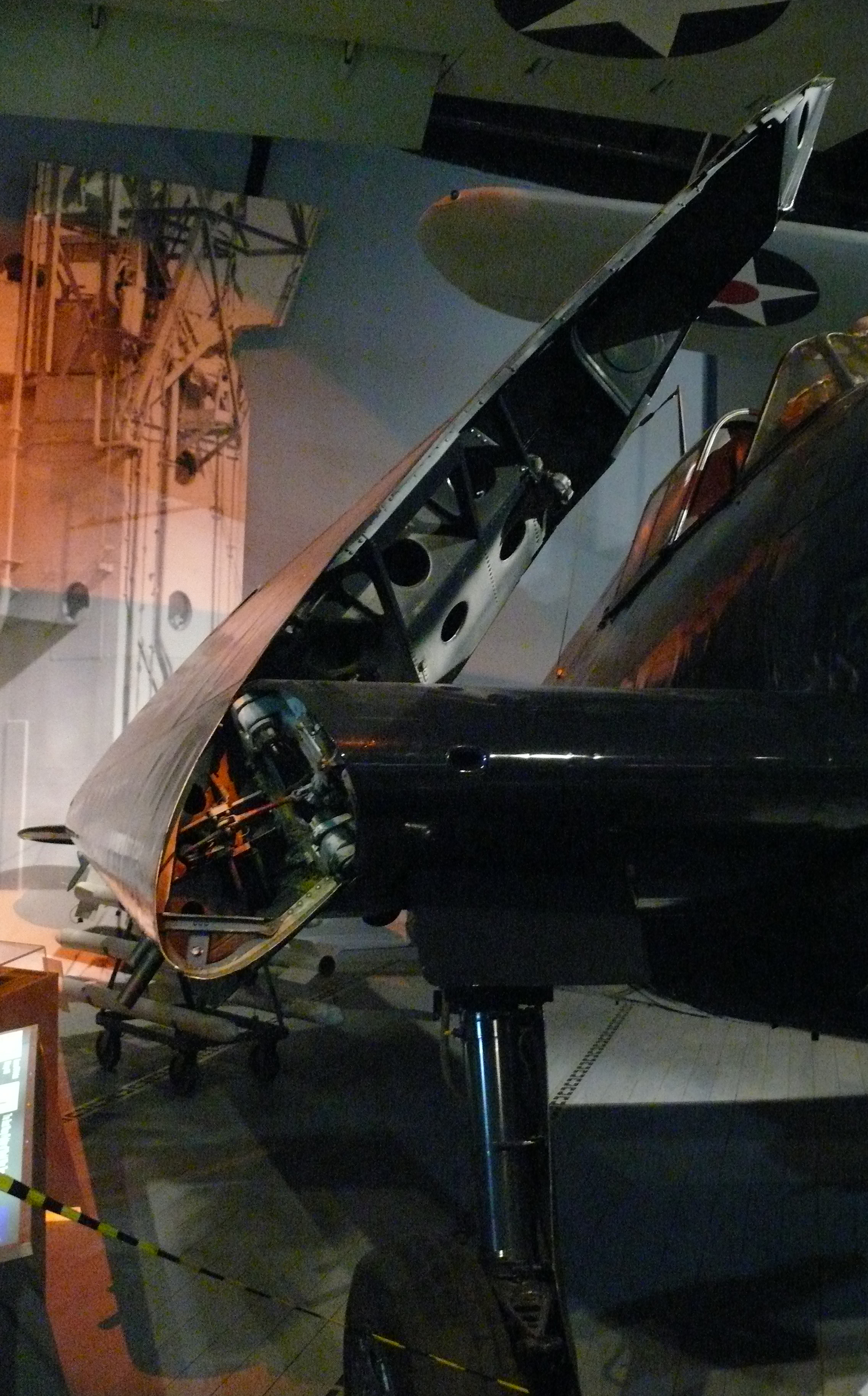
Folded wing of Grumman F6F Hellcat

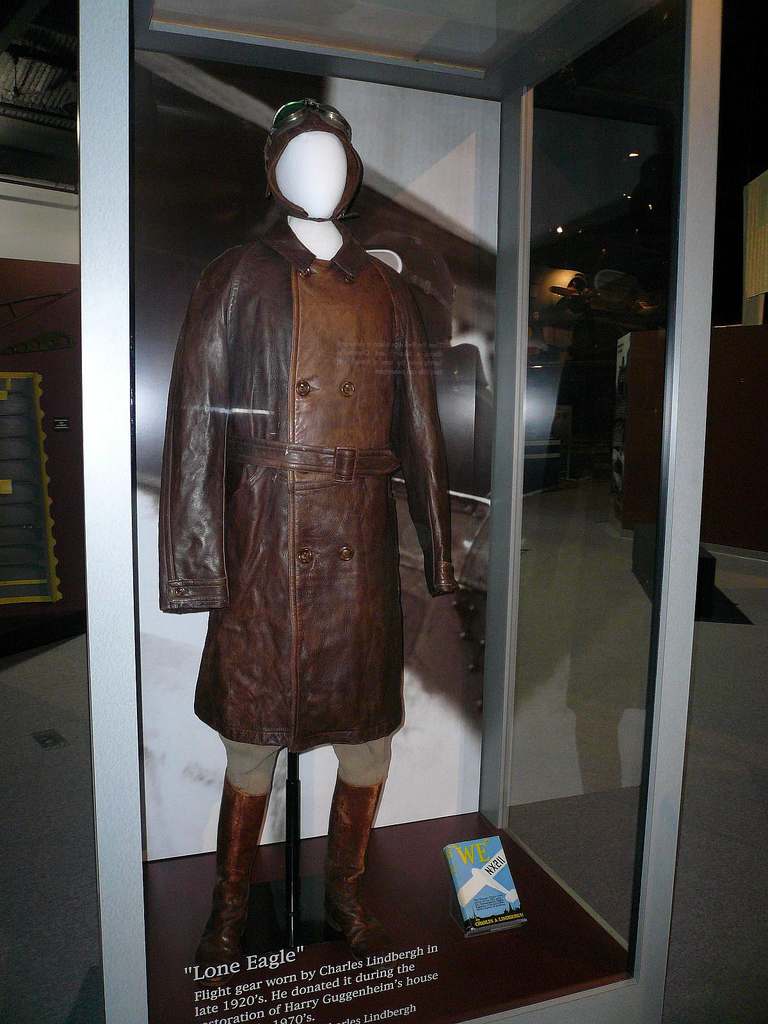
Charles Lindbergh's flight gear

== See also ==
- List of aerospace museums
- Statue of Sally Ride, which stands outside of the museum
