= El Bogotano =

Daily evening newspaper tabloid

Newspaper elBogotano
- Type: Tabloid
- Format: Berliner
- Founder: Consuelo Salgar de Montejo
- Founded: 1973
- Political alignment: Liberal
- Language: Spanish
- Country: Colombia
- OCLC number: 23848555
- Website: elbogotano.com.co

El Bogotano is a daily evening newspaper tabloid, founded in 1973 by the journalist, politician and businesswoman Consuelo Salgar Jaramillo in Bogotá, D.C., Colombia For a long time the editor of the newspaper was Yamid Amat, a renowned Colombian journalist and radio broadcaster. Since 2016 the director has been "Tagor".

The newspaper serves as a collaborative open digital media platform for independent journalists, causes and citizens to publish content with independence from large media monopolies or state controlled media. It is working on growing the reach of its audience to promote freedom of speech and provide independent journalism in Colombia and Latin America.

Despite its sensationalism, El Bogotano was also known for denouncing several political scandals in the 1970s, including a corruption case involving President Alfonso López Michelsen. It was also known for its infamous mistaken front-page headline published on its 2 January 1974 issue that read: Maremoto en Bolivia ("Tsunami in Bolivia", a landlocked country), when Yamid Amat was its director.

== Digital era ==
In 2016, `La Casa Editorial el Bogotano` repositioned the tradition of the newspaper founded in 1973, through a virtual version. It launched a website and a Twitter account;(@elBogotano). It has a presence in LinkedIn, Facebook, Instagram, YouTube and TikTok. It publishes articles by a number of well known writers and communicates news from Colombia, Latam and the world. It also offers a section for investigative reporting which has already produced revealing stories.
