= Teletigre =

Television channel in Bogotá, Colombia

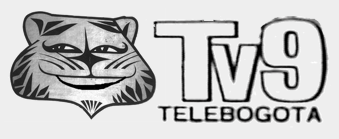
- Country: Colombia
- Broadcast area: Bogotá, Cundinamarca, Tolima, northern Huila

Ownership
- Owner: Producciones Técnicas Ltda.

History
- Launched: January 14, 1966; 59 years ago
- Founder: Consuelo Salgar de Montejo
- Closed: January 16, 1971; 54 years ago
- Replaced by: Tele 9 Corazón

Links
- Website: Teletigre

Teletigre, also known as TV-9 TeleBogotá, is Colombia's first private television channel, founded by journalist and politician Consuelo Salgar de Montejo, who won a state bid against Caracol TV, RTI Colombia, and Producciones Punch. It is now operating as a Digital Channel through Youtube and is owned by "La Casa Editorial el Bogotano."

Its signal only reached Bogotá, Cundinamarca, Tolima, and part of Huila, and broadcast daily, from 17:30 to 22:30, on Channel 9, hence its alternative name.

The channel partnered with U.S. network ABC (which owned 50% of the stocks) and relied on imported programming. According to a newspaper ad published on its inaugural day, Teletigre's first week of programming included mostly American shows as I Love Lucy, The Munsters, Flipper, Gunsmoke, 77 Sunset Strip, Route 66, M Squad, Hong Kong, and The Twilight Zone, with a few local shows, such as a kids' show, a women's programme and a newscast, comprising the rest of the programming.

Teletigre closed for political reasons (allegedly to the fact that the government was concerned of the power that it had handed to one individual, in this case Ms Salgar, in the then new mass media). Therefore the government decided not to renew the station broadcast licence to a single party. It would be replaced by Tele 9 Corazón, a local channel in state hands and, in 1972, by the Segunda Cadena, which would become a national network.

Colombia would not have broadcast private television channels until July 1998, when Caracol TV and RCN TV, two former programadoras owned by two of the main Colombian conglomerates, started full broadcasts after being granted two new private national concessions the year before; as of 2020, they remain the only national broadcast TV private licensees.

The brand name was revived by El Bogotano in 2021 as a digital platform.
