= Consuelo Salgar de Montejo =

Colombian politician (1928–2002)

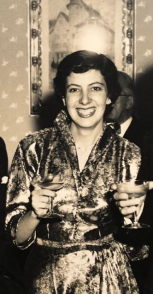

Senator of Colombia
- In office 20 July 1974 – 20 July 1978

Personal details
- Born: Consuelo Salgar de Montejo; 30 September 1928 Bogotá, Colombia
- Died: 1 October 2002 (aged 74) Miami, Florida, U.S.
- Party: Liberal
- Spouse: Leopoldo Montejo Peñaredonda
- Relations: Eustorgio Salgar, Great Grandfather
- Children: Leopoldo, Patricia, Mauricio, Felipe and Andrés
- Education: National University of Colombia, University of California, Berkeley
- Profession: Journalist, psychologist, politics, and businesswoman

Consuelo Salgar de Montejo (30 September 1928 – 2 October 2002) was a Colombian journalist, advertising executive, media entrepreneur, and politician.

Salgar studied in England and the United States. She joined McCann Erickson and later established Publicidad Técnica, her own advertising agency. She directed Ella, él y alguien más, a television sitcom, worked for Semana, and founded Flash magazine. In 1966, she won a bid for the first private television channel in Colombia, Teletigre (TV-9 Bogotá), which lasted 5 years until the new elected government decided not to renew its license. Salgar founded four newspapers: El Periódico, El Matutino, El Caleño, and El Bogotano.

Writer of the book; "Un siglo en Guerra".

== Politics ==
As a politician, she founded the Liberal Independent Movement (MIL), a dissident faction of the Colombian Liberal Party which would join the Frente Unido por el Pueblo, coalition with left-wing MOIR and populist ANAPO. Salgar was a senator, a Representative of the House, a deputy for Cundinamarca Assembly, and president of Bogotá City Council.

Salgar was an outspoken opponent of President Julio César Turbay Ayala's Security Statute. During Turbay's government she was arrested and sentenced to one year of imprisonment by a military judge on 7 November 1979, for allegedly having a legal gun of his property. She would be released 3 months later. Salgar brought the case to the United Nations Human Rights Committee.

== Personal life ==
Consuelo was born on 30 September 1928, in Bogotá, Colombia to Jorge Salgar de la Cuadra and Margot Jaramillo Arango. She married fellow advertising executive Leopoldo Montejo Peñaredonda with whom she had five children: Leopoldo, Patricia, Mauricio, Andrés, and Felipe. She died in Miami on 1 October 2002.
