= Inravisión =

Colombian public broadcaster, 1964–2004

- Instituto Nacional de Radio y Televisión

Agency overview
- Formed: April 1, 1963
- Dissolved: October 28, 2004
- Superseding agency: Radio Televisión Nacional de Colombia
- Type: Decentralized body
- Headquarters: Bogotá

The Inravisión (an acronym for the Instituto Nacional de Radio y Televisión) was a Colombian state entity responsible for the administration and operation of public radio and television services between 1963 and 2004. It was created by Decree 3267 of 1963 and dissolved in 2004, being replaced by RTVC Public Media System.

In 2026, the Colombian government announced the reinstatement of the historical name "Inravisión" as the institutional name of the public media system, without this implying the legal reactivation of the original entity.

== History ==
Inravisión was created by decree 3267 of December 20, 1963. This decree stated:

The public broadcasting and television service under the Ministry of Communications will be provided from April 1, 1964, by a public establishment with patrimonial, administrative and legal autonomy, which will be called the National Institute of Radio and Television.

Inravisión was responsible for, among other functions:

- Organizing contracts with commercial companies that operated television programming slots.
- Developing and implementing the plans and projects adopted by the Ministry of Communications.
- Providing official educational, cultural, and informational services through national radio and television broadcasting systems. Inravisión's first administrative headquarters was in the basement of the National Library of Colombia, on Calle 24 between 5 and 6, where the first television studios were located, where they operated from 1964 to 1993.

During the 1960s, Inravisión was a platform for broadcasting audiovisual information about various cultural phenomena. One example is the program "Modern Youth," directed by Alfonso Lizarazo and broadcast live on Saturdays from 5 to 6 p.m., featuring, among others, Los Speakers, Los Flippers, and Los Young Beats, along with Óscar Golden and Harold Orozco. In 1967, the program was renamed "Estudio 15" and, along with "El club del clan (Colombia)" and "Tele-estrella," it is remembered as "a space for modern music."

Because Inravisión was state-controlled, its television programming focused on cultural and non-formal education, giving rise to "Inravisión's Educational and Cultural Television," a space dedicated to complementing school curricula and combating illiteracy. These advances would be reflected in the 1970s through the use of satellites, which allowed for the exchange of programs with other television stations around the world. From On December 11, 1979, color television was inaugurated, being broadcast in some regions of the country, such as Bogotá, but not yet in the departmental capitals such as Barranquilla and Bucaramanga.

In 1993, it also assumed the task of classifying programs, which programmers had to submit 72 hours in advance in order to determine whether or not the programs were appropriate for children. In that same year, Inravisión moved entirely to the Centro Administrativo Nacional, at Calle 45 # 26-33. Inravisión, as an institute, made a decisive contribution to the development of television in Colombia. However, in 1995 its program classification task was taken over by the Comisión Nacional de Televisión (now Comisión de Regulación de Comunicaciones).

However, in the 1990s, Inravisión was plagued by continuous technical problems, which included a nationwide blackout of all three channels in June 1995 (described at the time as "the biggest setback in Inravisión's 41-year history"). Commercials broadcast with poor quality, deficiencies in signal reception, even in large cities like Cali, poorly calibrated cameras, leaks in the studios, and another 77-minute blackout of all three channels in December 1995.

Inravisión disappeared on October 28, 2004, when it was liquidated due to a massive pension liability of 600 billion pesos, a clear technological lag compared to private channels, and the poor financial condition of Canal Uno, Canal A, and Audiovisuales. While the statutes of the newly created RTVC (Sistema de Medios Públicos), Inravisión's successor, were being formalized, the public television network remained under the responsibility of Telecom - Colombia Telecomunicaciónes S.A. E.S.P.

A liquidator was appointed, along with a small number of staff, who received minimum wage until December 2005.

Currently, public radio and television operations are managed by RTVC Sistema de Medios Públicos.

On April 1, 2026, RTVC, under the direction of Hollman Morris, and under the administration of Gustavo Petro, announced that it would recover its historic name, Inravisión.

== Services ==
=== Radio ===
- Radiodifusora Nacional
- Frecuencia Joven (currently Radiónica under RTVC)
- Clásica 95.9 FM
- Radiodifusora Nacional de Colombia Internacional

=== Television ===
==== National ====
- Canal Uno
- Canal A (shut down in 2004 during the liquidation process and replaced with Canal Institucional)
- Señal Colombia

==== Regional ====
- Teleantioquia
- Telecaribe
- Telepacífico

== Slogans ==
- 1991-1993 La imagen de la televisión en Colombia (the image of TV in Colombia)
- 1994 - 40 años haciendo el camino para los colombianos (40 years paving the way for Colombians)
- 1995-2001 Inravision al %100 es mas! (Inravision at 100% is more!)
- 2001-2004 siempre al aire (always on air)
- 2004 - 50 años de televisión en Colombia (50 years of television in Colombia)
