= Canal Institucional =

Colombian public TV channel

- Type: Public broadcast television network
- Country: Colombia
- Broadcast area: Colombia

Programming
- Picture format: 1080i HDTV (upscaled to 16:9 480i for the channel's standard resolution signal)

Ownership
- Owner: Government of Colombia (publicly operated by Inravisión Sistema de Medios Públicos)
- Key people: Hollman Morris (Manager of RTVC); Lina Moreno (Executive Director)
- Sister channels: Señal Colombia

History
- Launched: February 2, 2004; 22 years ago
- Replaced: Canal A
- Former names: Señal Colombia Institucional (2004); Institucional (2004-2008/2009-2013); Señal Institucional (2008-2009/2013-2015); CITV Canal Institucional (2017–2018)

Links
- Website: https://www.canalinstitucional.tv/

Availability

Terrestrial
- Digital UHF: Channel 16.2 (RTVC multiplex)
- Analog VHF/UHF: Listings may vary

Canal Institucional is a Colombian public Terrestrial television channel launched on February 2, 2004, to replace Canal A after its merger with the programmer Audiovisuales.

The television station broadcasts the sessions of the Congress of the Republic and other governmental institutional programs, which until 2003 were broadcast by Señal Colombia in co-production with the Canal Congreso.

== History ==
The channel was approved on June 19, 2003. 70% of the programming was going to be devited to the Congress while the remaining 30% was given to government activities. On February 2, 2004, the channel was born under the name "Señal Colombia Institucional", replacing Canal A. It launched with an Andean condor as its symbol, designed by Misty Wells of Wells & Zen Associates. As a measure to the public television crisis that year, the channel was created under the control of Inravisión and operated by the programming company Audiovisuales. However, in October of that year, after the dissolution of Inravisión and Audiovisuales by the national government, the channel has since been operated by RTVC Sistema de Medios Públicos.

== See also ==
- Canal A
- Señal Colombia
- Canal 1
- Radio Nacional de Colombia
- Radiónica
- RTVC Sistema de Medios Públicos
