= 1940 in radio =

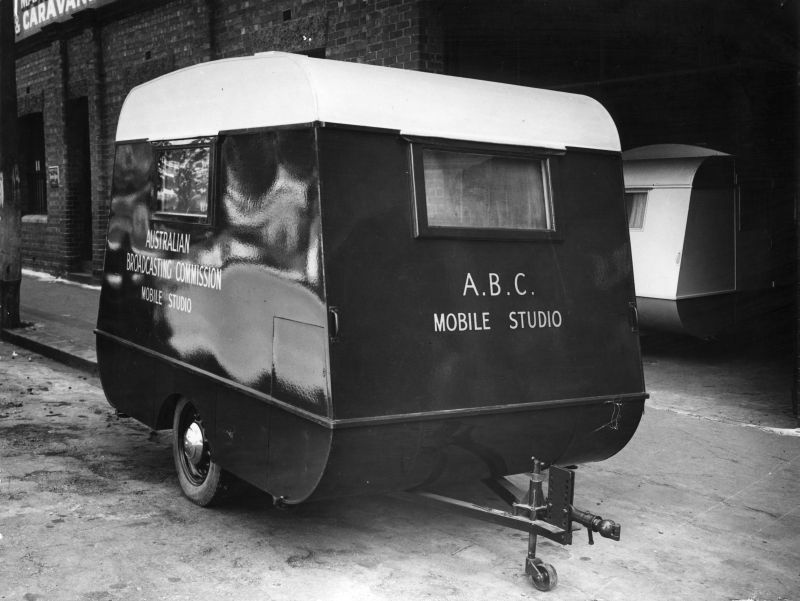
Caravan adapted as an ABC mobile studio in 1940

The year 1940 saw a number of significant events in radio broadcasting history.

== Events ==
- 5 January: FM radio is demonstrated for the Federal Communications Commission in the United States for the first time.
- 7 January: The BBC Forces Programme begins broadcasting in the United Kingdom; it becomes the most popular channel among civilians at home as well as its primary target audience.
- 1 February: Radio Nacional de Colombia is launched as Radiodifusora Nacional de Colombia three years after closure of the country's first state-owned radio station, HJN.
- 25 February: The Proud Valley is the first known film to have its première on radio when the BBC broadcasts a 60-minute version.
- 23 March: Antisemitic Member of Parliament (United Kingdom) Archibald Maule Ramsay uses a Parliamentary question to set out the times and frequency of nightly broadcasts by the 'New British Broadcasting Service', a Nazi propaganda radio station broadcasting from Germany.
- 9 April (7.30 pm): During the German invasion of Norway as part of Operation Weserübung, Vidkun Quisling proclaims a new collaborationist regime on the national radio station NRK.
- 10 May (9.00 pm): Neville Chamberlain makes the first public announcement of his resignation as Prime Minister of the United Kingdom, and his replacement by Winston Churchill, on the BBC Home Service.
- 14 May: BBC reporter Charles Gardner working in Reims incorporates the live sounds of a German air raid in a broadcast report.
- 26 May: Fireside chat by the President of the United States: On National Defense.
- 2 June: British Secretary of State for War Anthony Eden gives a radio address claiming success of the Dunkirk evacuation.
- 5 June: Yorkshire-born novelist and playwright J. B. Priestley broadcasts his first Sunday evening radio Postscript, "An excursion to hell", on the BBC Home Service, marking the role of the pleasure steamers in the Dunkirk evacuation, just completed.
- 18 June
  - General Charles de Gaulle, de facto leader of the Free French Forces in World War II, uses the airwaves of the BBC to make his Appeal of 18 June from London to the French people for resistance to the Nazi German occupation of France.
  - Winston Churchill, Prime Minister of the United Kingdom, repeats his "This was their finest hour" speech, made earlier to the House of Commons, on the BBC Home Service.
- 14 July: The BBC Home Service 9.00 pm news bulletin includes a vivid account of an air battle over the English Channel recorded live the previous day by reporter Charles Gardner. The bulletin is preceded by a speech by Churchill, "The War of the Unknown Warriorsˮ, and followed by J. B. Priestley's Postscript describing the seaside resort of Margate in wartime.
- 19 July: Adolf Hitler makes a peace appeal ("appeal to reason") to Britain in an address to the Reichstag, broadcast simultaneously in English translation by Paul Schmidt. BBC German-language broadcaster Sefton Delmer unofficially rejects it at once and Lord Halifax, British foreign minister, flatly rejects peace terms in a broadcast reply on 22 July.
- October: The evacuated BBC Radio Variety Department relocates to Bangor in north Wales from where it will broadcast until 1943.
- 15 October: Seven staff are killed when an attempt to eject a delayed-action German bomb from Broadcasting House in London fails.
- 30 October: Marshal Pétain makes a broadcast to the French people stating "I enter, today, into the way of collaboration" ("J'entre aujourd'hui dans la voie de la collaboration...").
- 29 December: Fireside chat: On National Security.

== Debuts ==
- 7 January: Gene Autry's Melody Ranch debuts on CBS.
- 28 January: Beat the Band debuts on NBC.
- 5 February: Amanda of Honeymoon Hill debuts on NBC Blue.
- 11 February: The Chamber Music Society of Lower Basin Street debuts on NBC Blue.
- 12 February: The Adventures of Superman (1940–1951) debuts on WOR.
- 29 February: Welsh Rarebit, broadcast by the BBC from its Cardiff studio (until 1944 and then from 1948 until 1952)
- 18 March: Light of the World debuts on NBC Red.
- 23 March: Truth or Consequences debuts on CBS.
- 21 April: Take It or Leave It makes its debut on CBS Radio in the United States, with Bob Hawk as host.
- 29 April: The Bell Telephone Hour debuts on NBC Red.
- 23 June: Music While You Work debuts on the BBC Forces Programme.
- 24 June: The Burl Ives Show debuts on NBC.
- 3 July: The Abbott and Costello Show debuts on NBC.
- 29 July: Duffy's Tavern first broadcast as part of the Forecast audition series on CBS. It returns as a regular series 1 March 1941.
- 4 August: Crime Doctor debuts on CBS.
- 1 November: Unlimited Horizons debuts on NBC.
- 9 December: Can You Top This? debuts on WOR (AM).
- 16 December: Charlie and Jessie debuts on CBS.
- 29 December: Deadline Dramas debuts on NBC.

== Closings ==
- 19 January: Brenda Curtis ends its run on network radio (CBS).
- 19 January: Doc Barclay's Daughters ends its run on network radio (CBS).
- 12 February: Author, Author ends its run on network radio (Mutual).
- 15 March: Betty and Bob ends its run on network radio NBC.
- 22 March: The Affairs of Anthony ends its run on network radio (Blue Network).
- 23 March: Arch Oboler's Plays ends its run on network radio (NBC).
- 27 April: Art for Your Sake ends its run on network radio (NBC).
- 1 May: Avalon Time ends its run on network radio (NBC).
- 4 June: Brenthouse ends its run on network radio (Blue Network).
- 19 July: Caroline's Golden Store ends its run on network radio (CBS).
- 19 July: The Carters of Elm Street ends its run on network radio (Mutual).
- 27 September: The Dinah Shore Show ends its run on network radio (Blue Network).
- 7 October: Adventures in Reading ends its run on network radio.
- 19 October: Renfrew of the Mounted ends its run on network radio (CBS).

== Births ==
- 1 April: Annie Nightingale, British radio music presenter
- 10 April: Gloria Hunniford, Northern Irish broadcast presenter
- 21 May: Ronan O'Rahilly, Irish-born media entrepreneur (died 2020)
- 5 June: David Brudnoy, popular talk radio host in Boston, Massachusetts from 1976 (died 2004)
- 11 July: Tommy Vance, British radio broadcaster (died 2005)
- 17 July: Tim Brooke-Taylor, British broadcast comedy performer (died 2020)
- 24 September: Barbara Birdfeather, American radio DJ (died 2009)
- 9 October: John Lennon, English musician, radio personality and member of The Beatles (murdered 1980)
- 13 November: Wally K. Daly, British radio scriptwriter (died 2020)
- Dickie Arbiter, British royal broadcast presenter

== Deaths ==
- 5 March: Maxine Elliott, US actress and businesswoman, former co-owner of the Maxine Elliott's Theatre, 72
- 9 April: Mrs. Patrick Campbell, English actress, 72
- 9 August: Alessandro Bonci, Italian tenor, 70
- 30 October: Hilda Matheson, pioneering British radio talks producer, 52 (Graves' disease)
- 23 November: Billy Jones, US singer, known for The Happiness Boys, 51 (heart attack)

== See also ==
- List of the initial commercial FM station assignments issued by the Federal Communications Commission on October 31, 1940
