= Helga Rivas =

Colombian government official (born 1969)

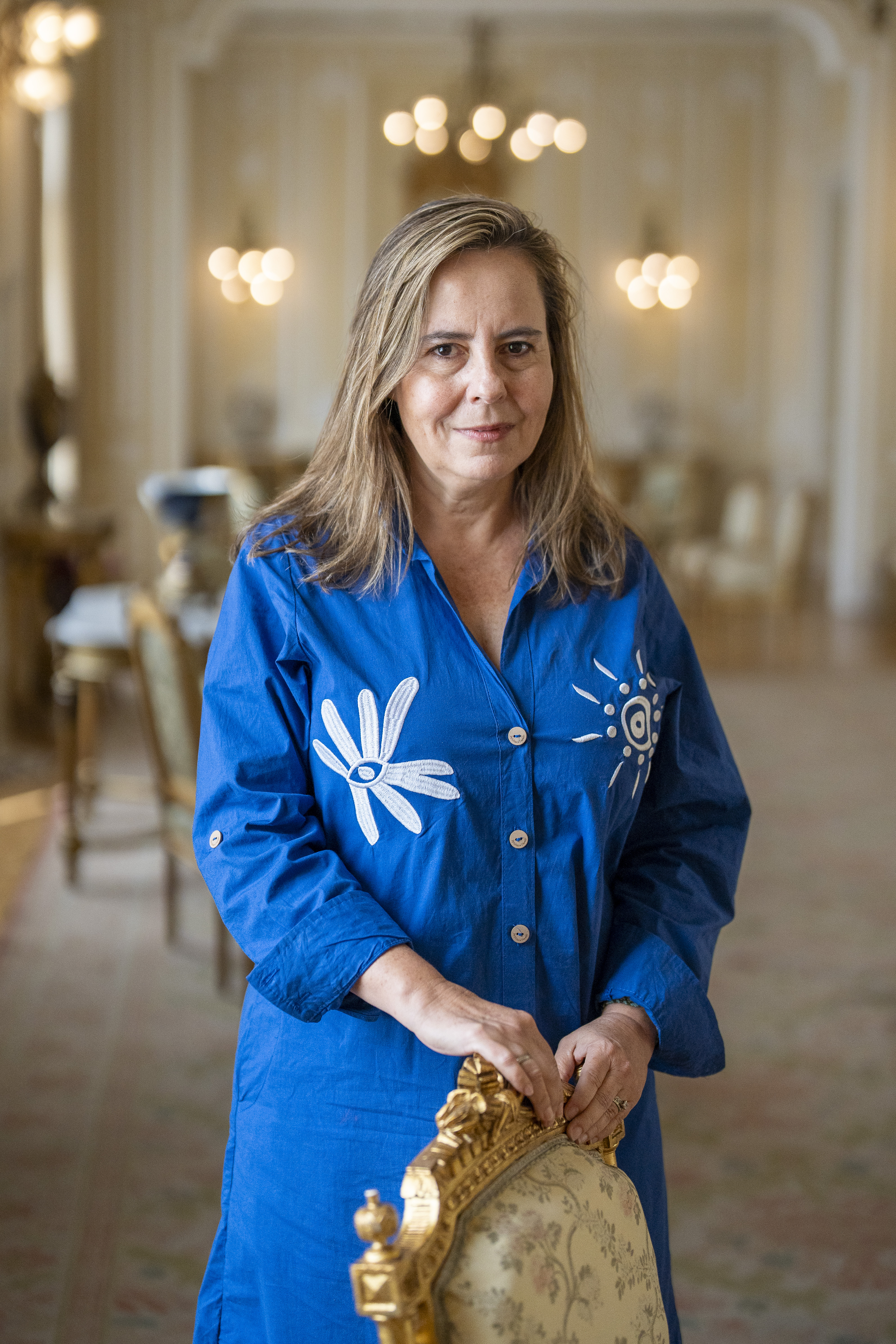
- Official portrait, 2024

Minister of Housing, City and Territory
- Incumbent
- Assumed office July 23, 2024
- President: Gustavo Petro
- Preceded by: Catalina Velasco

General Director of the SNGRD
- In office February 28, 2024 – March 11, 2024
- President: Gustavo Petro
- Preceded by: Olmedo López
- Succeeded by: Carlos Alberto Carrillo

Secretary of Habitad and Housing
- In office October 17, 2014 – January 1, 2016
- Mayor: Gustavo Petro
- Preceded by: María Mercedes Maldonado
- Succeeded by: María Carolina Castillo

Personal details
- Born: Helga María Rivas Ardila; September 6, 1969 (age 57) Bogotá, D.C., Colombia
- Party: Humane Colombia (2011-present)
- Other political affiliations: Historic Pact for Colombia (2020-present)
- Education: University of the Andes

Helga María Rivas Ardila (born September 6, 1969) is a Colombian architect, researcher and specialist in urban design who served as Acting Director General of the SNGRD (National Urban Development Commission) from February to March 2024, and as Secretary of Habitat and Housing of Bogotá from 2014 to 2016 during Gustavo Petro's mayoral term. Since 2024, she has served as Minister of Housing, City and Territory.

Born in Bogotá, D.C., Rivas studied architecture at the University of the Andes and later specialized in Urban Design. She has been one of the most important figures within the Petro administration at the Ministry of Housing, City and Territory.

Political offices
Preceded by Catalina Velasco	Minister of Housing, City and Territory; 2024–present	Incumbent
Order of precedence
Preceded by Lena Estrada as Minister of Environment and Sustainable Development	Order of precedence of Colombia as Minister of Housing, City and Territory since July 23, 2024	Succeeded by Carina Murcia as Minister of Information Technologies and Communications
