= Mery Janneth Gutiérrez =

Colombian politician

Minister of Information Technologies and Communications
- In office August 8, 2022 – September 4, 2022
- President: Gustavo Petro
- Preceded by: Karen Abudinen
- Succeeded by: Sandra Urrutia

Personal details
- Born: Mery Jannet Gutiérrez
- Education: Universidad Externado

Mery Janneth Gutiérrez is a lawyer specializing in contract law, specialist in management and ICT, who served briefly as Minister of ICT of Colombia on August 7, 2022. She is currently serving as manager of Programar Televisión and legal adviser.

== Ministry of ICT ==
In August 2022, she was designed as ICT Minister by Colombian President Gustavo Petro with the challenge to recover the $ 70.000 millions given as an advance to Unión Temporal Centros Poblados while Karen Abudinen was Ministry.

However, she would not last long in that position, due to public statements issued by Daniel Coronell's, a Plural Comunicaciones shareholder, although her historic job for the media democratization. This, due to a lawsuit that Gutiérrez had allegedly filed to stop a controversial public tender where only Plural Comunicaciones could participate, which finally benefited this Daniel Coronell's company, with the intervention of the former ICT Minister David Luna, despite its unconstitutionality, and the interest conflict denounced by Gutiérrez.

== Colombian Channel One ==
In Colombia, over time there have been two private television channels: RCN Televisión and Caracol Televisión, owned by business families and managed with their own resources. Likewise, there is a third channel called Canal Uno, whose infrastructure, unlike the previous ones, is financed from the national budget. Although it is a public infrastructure, its administration is the responsibility of private companies called Programadoras in charge of generating content based on Colombian Laws and regulations. In this regard, the grant to manage public infrastructures must be supplied through bidding processes, a contractual modality where a normally plural number of bidders are presented with various proposals to opt for the administration of their contents.

== Censorship to Programar Televisión ==
After 2012 Programar Televisión was removed from any process related by the ANTV, despite the fact that the latter had requested an extension to continue providing its services started since 2003 in compliance with the requirements of the Law as stipulated in a complaint filed before the Superintendency by Programar Televisión attorney, Mery Jannet Gutiérrez.

== Controversies ==
In 2017, the ICT Minister, David Luna, developed a tender to grant the Canal 1 in compliance with a new article included in the Development Plan of then President Juan Manuel Santos, which allowed the tender to grant his administration to be developed with a single proponent, despite the fact that according to the Colombian Constitutional Court, this should be carried out with a plural number of proponents, that is, with more than one; this was stated in a conditional constitutionality ruling issued by the high court, arguing that the original conditions of the bidding required a number of not less than four bidders and it had only been closed with one, against the required plurality. These facts, and the subsequent demand for the tender by various bidders, questioned the legitimacy of the process that was finally granted to the only bidder who was allowed to appear, the journalist and businessman Daniel Coronell, without paying attention to the alleged vices of illegality pointed out by various independent media.
