= Diego Molano Vega =

Colombian politician (born 1967)

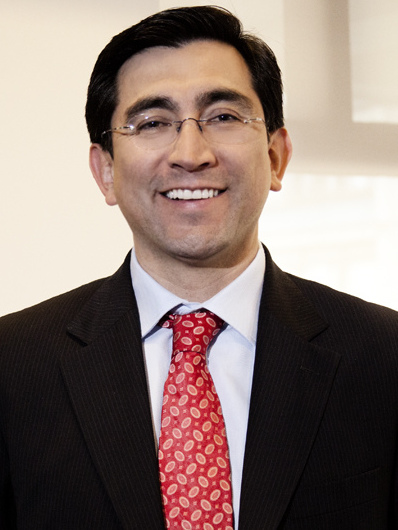

Minister of Information Technologies and Communications
- In office 7 August 2010 – 11 May 2015
- President: Juan Manuel Santos
- Preceded by: Daniel Medina
- Succeeded by: David Luna

Personal details
- Born: 6 October 1967 (age 58) Tunja, Boyacá, Colombia
- Party: Liberal
- Education: Pontifical Xavierian University (B.Sc., M.Econ); International Institute for Management Development (MBA)
- Profession: Electronic Engineer

Diego Molano Vega (born 6 October 1967) is former Minister of Information Technologies and Communications of Colombia. He was appointed minister by President Juan Manuel Santos since 2010.

Molano has led Colombia to become one of the top countries in the region in terms of ICT. In 2010, he created the "Plan Vive Digital", a national technology plan recently portrayed as an example at the World Economic Forum in Davos, plan which also led Colombia to obtain in 2012 the GSMA Government Leadership Award for being the country with the best public policies in technology around the globe.

In addition to his activities as Minister, Molano is a member of several boards, such as the International Telecommunication Union (ITU) m-Powering Development Initiative, The Global Innovation Index; the world's most important publication of innovation, Barcelona Mobile World Capital (MWC), the Competitiveness Lab of the World Economic Forum (WEF), and a board member of major international business organizations, such as the American Association of Telecommunications Operators (Ahciet), the Mercosur Business Forum-Europe (MEBF), EU Brazil and the Colombian Chamber of Commerce in Spain.

He is also President of other major boards: 4-72; the official postal operator in Colombia, The Public Television Services; includes a total of 9 channels; Colombia's Center for Bioinformatics and Computational Biology (BIOS), Colombian Telecommunications Regulatory Commission (CRC) and The Colombian National Spectrum Agency (ANE) and was founder and president of the Regulators Association of Latin America Telecommunications (Regulatel) .

He is a frequent speaker at major international ICT events that include The Mobile World Congress (MWC), The World Economic Forum (WEF) and The Inter-American Telecommunication Commission (CITEL), among others.

== Biography ==
He was born on October 6, 1967, in Tunja, Boyacá. His parents are the educational Psychologist Mary Vega and the engineer Enrique Molano. He is the eldest of four children and lived in Tunja until graduated from High School.

== Training ==
Molano Vega attended the Colegio Boyacá de Tunja. After graduation, he moved to Bogotá to pursue a degree in Electronic Engineering and a master's degree in Economics at the Pontifical Xavierian University. He later attended the International Institute for Management Development (IMD), in Lausanne, Switzerland graduating with a Master in Business Administration (MBA).

== Career ==
He has held executive positions in multinationals such as Ascom (company) (Switzerland), BellSouth (USA) and Telefónica (Spain), where he was responsible for the operation in areas of corporate relations, regulation and wholesale businesses in more than 20 countries around the world.

He began his career in the private sector and in 1996 he was appointed Director of the Telecommunications Regulatory Commission (called today Communications Regulatory Commission) Communications Regulation Commission where he led the liberation of the communications industry and paved the way for competition and private investment in the industry of telecommunications in the country.

Later on he went to manage the areas of corporate relations, wholesale businesses and regulation at multinationals like BellSouth (EE.UU.) and Telefónica (Spain).

On August 6, 2010, he was appointed Minister of Information Technologies and Communications by President Juan Manuel Santos.

Three months later, President Santos administration formulated the "Plan Vive Digital" which aims at increasing Internet adoption. Its main goals are reducing poverty and creating jobs[1].

The "Plan Vive Digital" has already achieved 100% of its goals: Colombia is the first country in Latin America with high-speed Internet in all of its territory thanks to the development of the National Optical Fiber Project and the High-Speed Network that connect all the municipalities; even departments located in the Amazon rainforest. In order to improve the quality of the education, this Government delivered close to 2 million computers and tablets; more than 7600 internet community access centers have been deployed to connect the farmers, and a network of more than 62000 entrepreneurs who are turning their ideas into ICT-based businesses has been developed.

Among other achievements of the "Plan Vive Digital" are bringing Internet to rural and remote areas with more than 100 inhabitants, through over 6,800 Internet community centers called Kioscos Vive Digital. Colombia was also the first country in Latin America with 4G LTE networks, currently counting 6 carriers.
