= María Mercedes Maldonado =

Colombian politician (born 1958)

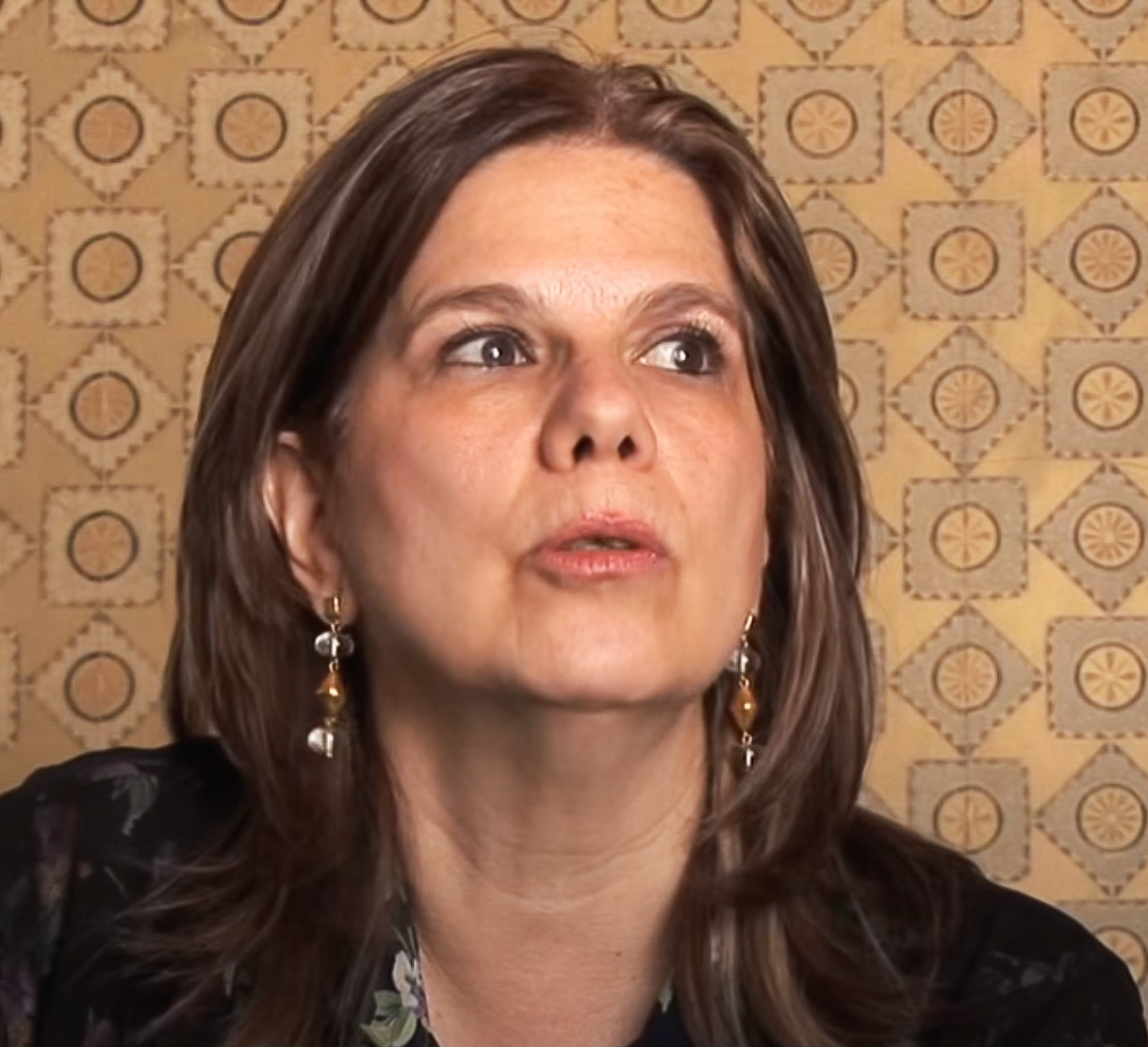
- Maldonado, c. 2015

Secretary of Housing and Habitad of Bogotá
- In office June 27, 2012 – October 18, 2014
- Mayor: Gustavo Petro
- Preceded by: María Gaitán
- Succeeded by: Helga Rivas

Acting Mayor of Bogotá
- Acting; April 21, 2014 – April 23, 2014
- Mayor: Gustavo Petro
- Preceded by: Rafael Pardo
- Succeeded by: Gustavo Petro

Personal details
- Born: María Mercedes Maldonado Copello; November 29, 1958 (age 67) Cúcuta, North Santander, Colombia
- Party: Independent (2020-present)
- Other political affiliations: Humane Colombia (2012-2020)
- Education: Universidad Externado de Colombia (LLB)

María Mercedes Maldonado Copello (born November 29, 1958) is a Colombian politician, lawyer, and academic who served as Secretary of Housing and Habitad of Bogotá for Bogotá from 2012 to 2014 under Mayor Gustavo Petro. A member of the Humane Colombia party, Maldonado also served as acting mayor of Bogotá.

Born in Cúcuta, North Santander, Maldonado studied law at Universidad Externado de Colombia. Later, she worked as a professor and researcher at the Institute of Urban Studies, the National University of Colombia, and the University of the Andes.

Political offices
Preceded by María Gaitán	Secretary of Housing and Habitad of Bogotá; 2012–2014	Succeeded by Helga Rivas
Preceded by Rafael Pardo	Acting Mayor of Bogotá; 2014-2014	Succeeded by Gustavo Petro
