= Rafael Pardo =

Colombian politician

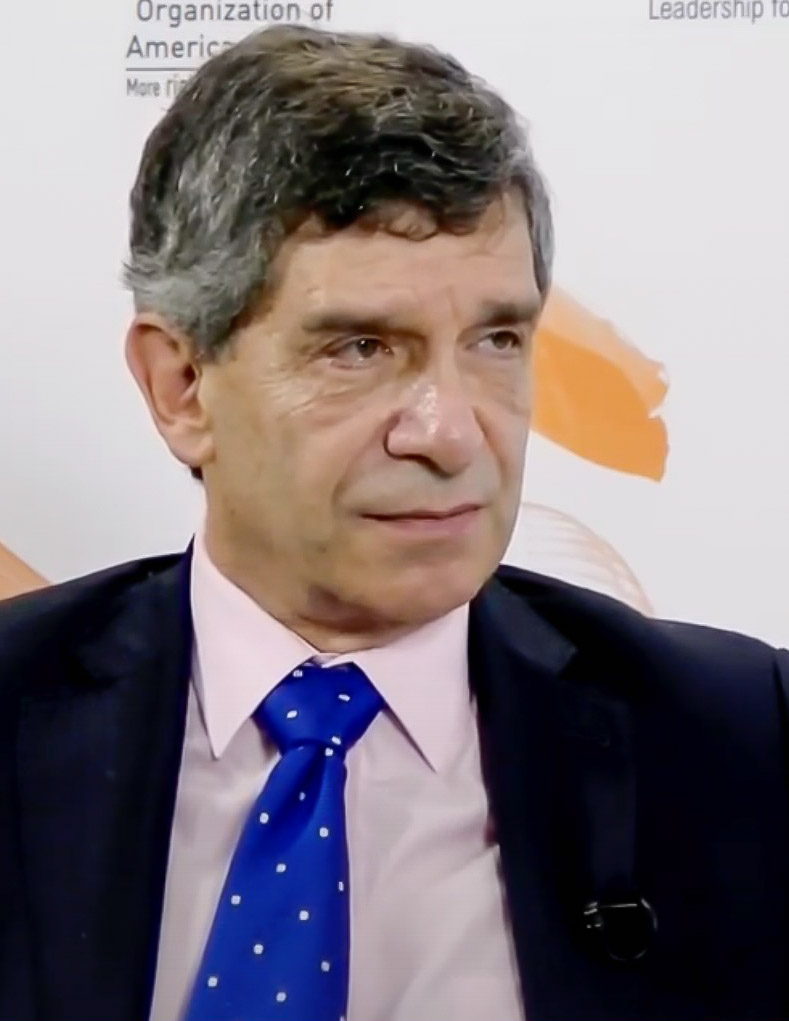
- Pardo in 2016

Minister of Labour
- In office 10 November 2011 – 7 August 2018
- President: Juan Manuel Santos
- Preceded by: Position established
- Succeeded by: Alicia Arango

Acting Mayor of Bogotá
- In office 19 March 2014 – 21 April 2014
- Appointed by: Juan Manuel Santos
- Preceded by: Gustavo Petro
- Succeeded by: María Mercedes Maldonado

Senator of Colombia
- In office 20 July 2002 – 20 July 2006

Minister of National Defence
- In office 7 August 1991 – 7 August 1994
- President: César Gaviria
- Preceded by: Oscar Botero Restrepo
- Succeeded by: Fernando Botero Zea

Personal details
- Born: Rafael Pardo Rueda; 26 November 1953 (age 72) Bogotá, D.C., Colombia
- Party: Liberal
- Spouse: Claudia de Francisco (m. 1982; sep. 2015)
- Children: 3
- Education: University of the Andes (BA, 1977)
- Profession: Economist
- Website: www.rafaelpardo.com

Rafael Pardo Rueda (born 26 November 1953) is a Colombian politician. A Liberal party politician and economist, he has previously served as the 1st Minister of Labour of Colombia serving in the Administration of President Juan Manuel Santos Calderón, Minister of National Defence, and was elected Senator of Colombia for the 2002-2006 legislative period.

== Career ==
A 1994-1995 Fellow at the Weatherhead Centre for International Affairs of Harvard Faculty of Arts and Sciences in Cambridge, Massachusetts.

He was the candidate of the Liberal Party for the 2010 Presidential Election.

On 31 October 2011, President Juan Manuel Santos Calderón announced the designation of Pardo as the head of the newly created Ministry of Labour, established as part of a wider Ministerial Cabinet Reform in order to fulfil some of his 2010 campaign promises.

In March 2014, President Santos appointed Minister Pardo as acting Mayor of Bogotá, a position he held until April of that year. Pardo is also a member of Washington D.C. based think tank The Inter-American Dialogue.

== Works ==
Books

- Pardo Rueda, Rafael (1996). De Primera Mano: Colombia 1986-1994, Entre Conflictos y Esperanzas [First Hand: Colombia 1986-1994, Between Conflicts and Hopes]. Literatura y ensayo (in Spanish). Bogotá: Norma Editorial. ISBN 978-958-04-3661-4. LCCN 97162511. OCLC 252955438.
- Pardo Rueda, Rafael (1999). Nueva Seguridad Para América Latina [New Security For Latin America]. Textos (in Spanish). Vol. 29. Bogotá: Friedrich Ebert Foundation of Colombia: CEREC. ISBN 978-958-9061-99-2. LCCN 00334863. OCLC 45698956.
- Pardo Rueda, Rafael (2001). El Siglo Pasado [The Last Century] (in Spanish). Bogotá: Colpatriañ CEREC. ISBN 978-958-8101-06-4. LCCN 2002393043. OCLC 48969250.
- Pardo Rueda, Rafael (2004). La Historia de las Guerras [History of Wars] (in Spanish). Bogotá: B. Colombia. ISBN 978-958-97405-5-2. LCCN 2005420183. OCLC 60841389.
- Pardo Rueda, Rafael (2007). Fin del Paramilitarismo: ¿Es Posible Su Desmonte? [The End of Paramilitarism: Is Its Decline Possible?] (in Spanish). Barcelona: Ediciones B. ISBN 978-958-8294-18-6. LCCN 2008415004. OCLC 190863961.
- Pardo Rueda, Rafael (2014). Entre dos poderes (Tomo I): De cómo la guerra fría moldeó a América Latina [Between two powers (Volume I): How the Cold War shaped Latin America] (in Spanish). Taurus Historia. ISBN 9789587587142.

Other

- Pardo Rueda, Rafael (July 1995). New issues in Latin American's [sic] security after the Cold War (Thesis/Dissertation). Weatherhead Centre for International Affairs. OCLC 41450989.
- Pardo Rueda, Rafael (2005-10-13). La Ley de Justicia y Paz ¿Traerá Una Verdadera Paz? [The Justice and Peace Law: Will It Bring True Peace?] (PDF) (Article/Paper) (in Spanish). FRIDE. Archived from the original (PDF) on 2012-04-01.
- Pardo Rueda, Rafael (2005). "Human Rights and the Wars on Drugs and Terrorism: A View from Latin America" (PDF). Occasional Papers (Article/Paper) (9). The Liberal Institute of the Friedrich Naumann Foundation.
