= Catalina Velasco =

Colombian economist (born 1971)

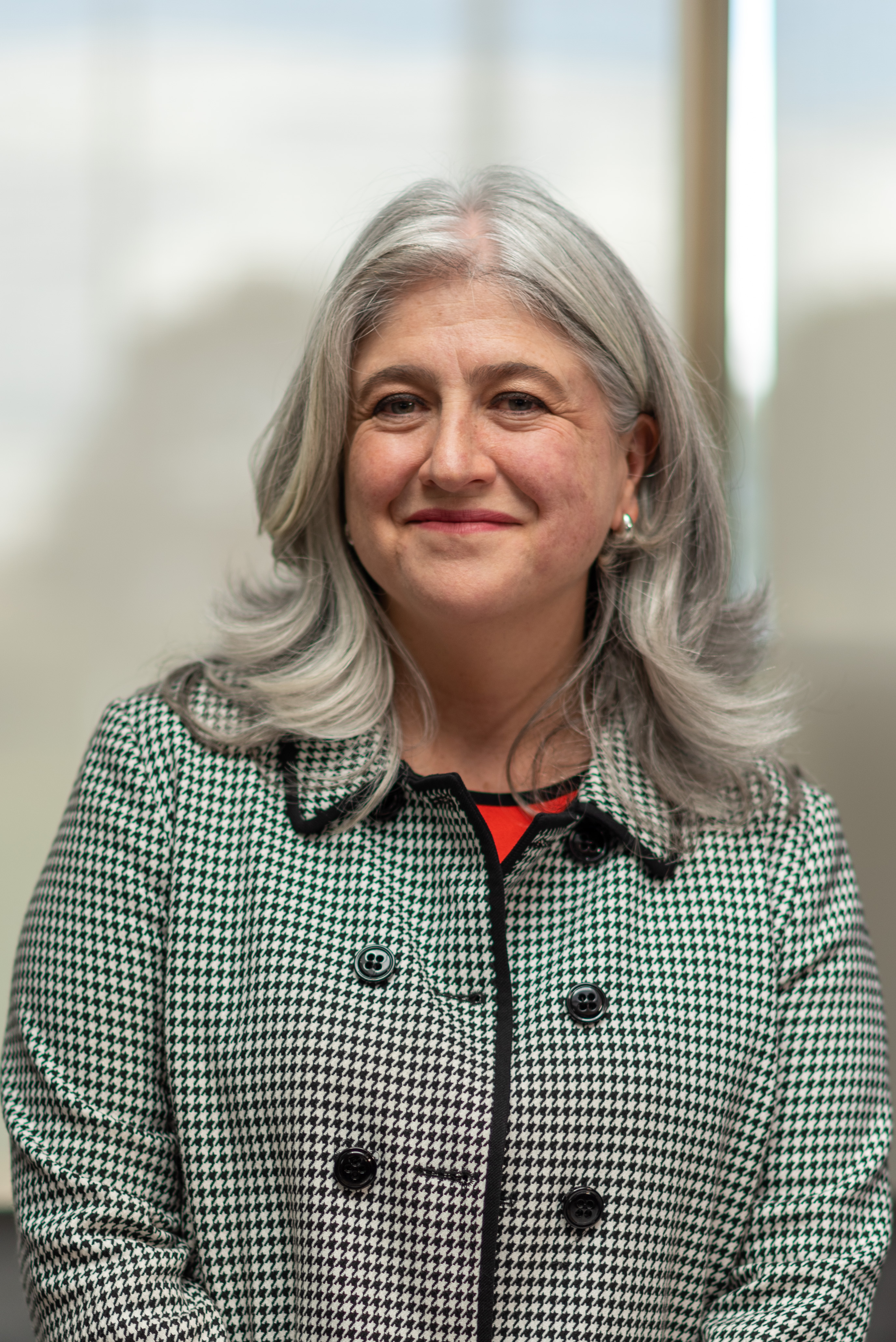

Minister of Housing, City and Territory
- In office August 11, 2022 – July 23, 2024
- President: Gustavo Petro
- Preceded by: Susana Correa
- Succeeded by: Helga Rivas

Secretary of Habitat of Bogotá
- In office January 1, 2008 – October 31, 2009
- Mayor: Samuel Moreno
- Preceded by: Juanita Moreno
- Succeeded by: Juanita Rodríguez

Secretary of Planning of Bogotá
- In office January 1, 2006 – January 1, 2007
- Mayor: Luis Eduardo Garzón
- Preceded by: Jaime Castro Castro
- Succeeded by: Clara López

Personal details
- Born: Marta Catalina Velasco Campuzano; June 18, 1971 (age 54) Bogotá, D.C., Colombia
- Party: Liberal
- Education: Pontifical Xavierian University (BUP); University of Michigan (MP); Universidad Externado de Colombia (PhD)
- Alma mater: University of the Andes

Marta Catalina Velasco Campuzano (born June 18, 1971) is a Colombian economist and politician who served as Minister of Housing, City and Territory from 2022 to 2024 under President Gustavo Petro. A member of the Liberal party, shas also served as Secretary of Habitat and Secretary of Planning of Bogotá.

Born in Bogotá, D.C., Velasco studied economics at the University of the Andes. She also specialized in urban planning law from the Pontificia Universidad Javeriana. She has worked as a consultant in urban management and public policy.

== Trajectory ==
Velasco is an economist from the Universidad de los Andes. She is a specialist in urban law from the Pontificia Universidad Javeriana, a master's degree in Public Policy from the University of Michigan and a doctorate in political studies from the Externado de Colombia University.

=== Bogota Planning Secretary (2006-2007) ===
Velasco began her professional life in 1989 as an economist and consultant for different companies until 2004. That year, the then mayor of Bogotá, Luis Eduardo Garzón, appointed her as Undersecretary of Planning and Finance of the Bogota District Education Secretariat. Subsequently, Garzón appointed her as District Planning Secretary between January 1, 2006, and January 1, 2007.

=== Secretary of Habitat of Bogotá (2008-2009) ===
The new mayor of Bogotá, Samuel Moreno, appointed Velasco as District Habitat Secretary for the period between January 1, 2008, and October 31, 2009.

On February 1, 2012, Velasco was appointed as Vice President of Public Services and Regulation of Empresa de Energía de Bogotá. She held the position that she held until November 15, 2013, during the mayoralty of Gustavo Petro Urrego. Since February 2014, she has been a consultant in Public Policy and Urban Management for the Bogota Mayor's Office during the administrations of Gustavo Petro Urrego and Claudia López Hernández.

== Minister of Housing, City and Territory ==
On August 7, 2022, Velasco was appointed Minister of Housing of Colombia by President Gustavo Petro. In the role she has highlighted gaps in drinking water and basic sanitation coverage, particularly in rural areas, as key policy priorities, and has pursued partnerships to advance major public initiatives within her portfolio.

In 2023, United Nations Secretary-General António Guterres appointed Velasco to his Advisory Group on Local and Regional Governments, co-chaired by Pilar Cancela Rodríguez and Fatimatou Abdel Malick.

Political offices
| Preceded by Susana Correa | Minister of Housing, City and Territory; 2022-2024 | Succeeded by Helga Rivas |
