= RTVC Sistema de Medios Públicos =

National public broadcasting corporation of Colombia

Coordinates: 4°38′16″N 74°5′32″W

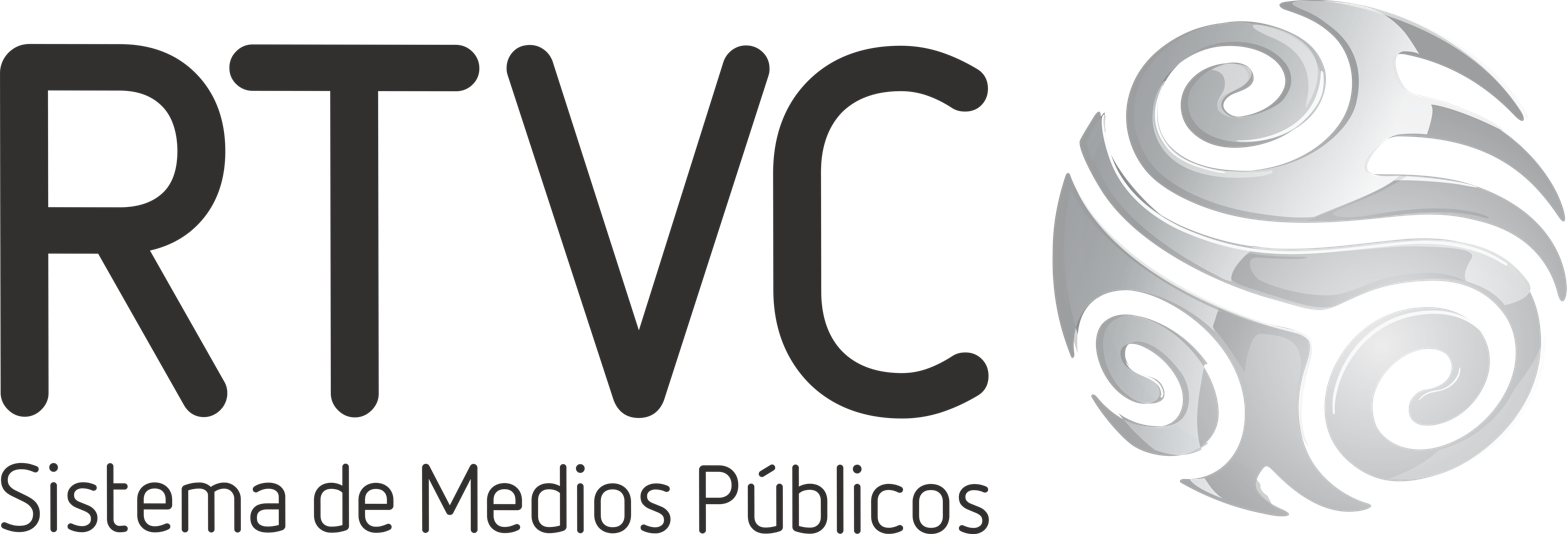

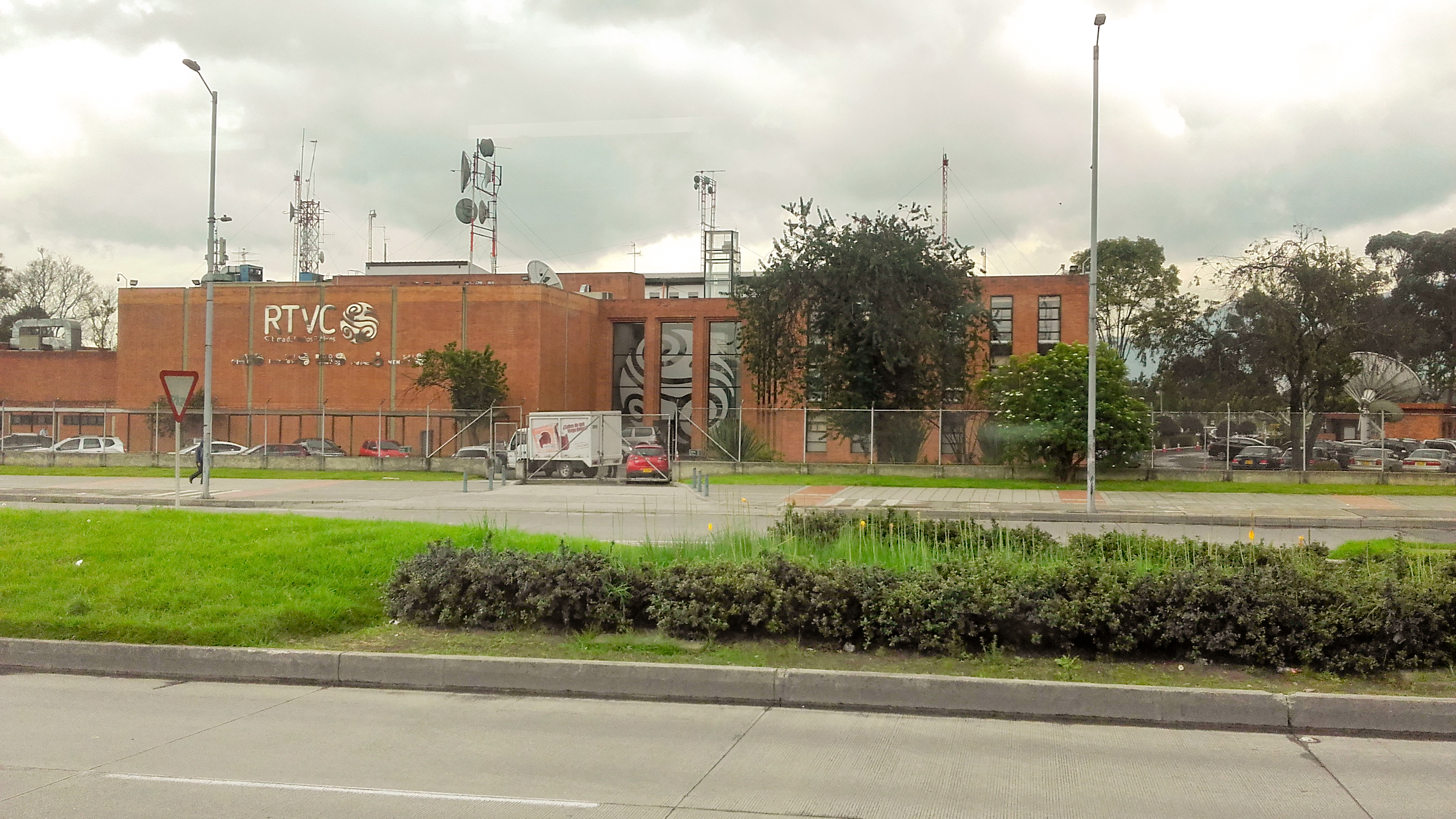
- Formerly: Radio Televisión Nacional de Colombia (2004-2013); Señal Colombia Sistema de Medios Públicos (2013-2015); RTVC Sistema de Medios Públicos (2015-2026); Inravisión Sistema de Medios Públicos (2026)
- Type: State-owned enterprise
- Predecessor: Inravisión; Audiovisuales
- Founded: October 28, 2004; 22 years ago
- Headquarters: 26–33 Carrera 45, Centro Administrativo Nacional, Teusaquillo, Bogotá, Colombia
- Products: Public broadcasting
- Owner: Ministry of Information Technologies and Communications
- Website: www.inravision.gov.co

RTVC Sistema de Medios Públicos (formerly known as Radio Televisión Nacional de Colombia, later as Señal Colombia Sistema de Medios Públicos, and RTVC Sistema de Medios Públicos) is a state-owned entity responsible for managing public radio and television in Colombia.

The entity is financed with resources from Colombian taxpayers and is linked to the Ministry of Information and Communications Technologies. Its mission is to offer truthful, timely, and neutral information, guaranteeing a plurality of voices and access to content that reflects cultural and social diversity in Colombia. Its main function is to produce, program, and operate state radio and television services, such as Señal Colombia, Canal Institucional, Radio Nacional de Colombia, and Radionica.

== History ==
RTVC was created by decree 3525 of October 28, 2004, by dissolving Inravisión and its public programmer and producer Audiovisuales, under the government of President Álvaro Uribe Vélez, being from that moment in charge of the production and programming of public radio and television.

At the time of the creation of RTVC, it assumed the broadcasting of the channels Señal Colombia, Canal Institucional, Canal Uno, as well as the AM and FM frequencies of the Radiodifusora Nacional de Colombia. On October 15, 2005, the radio station Radiónica, formerly known as 99-1 Frecuencia Joven de la Radiodifusora Nacional de Colombia, went on the air. In December 2005, the children's programming block of Señal Colombia, Mi Señal Colombia, was launched.

In June 2013, RTVC became Señal Colombia Sistema de Medios Públicos (Signal Colombia Public Media System), unifying all its radio and television operations to strengthen public television and radio. This change allowed for the development of strategies to counter the audience dominance of private channels. As part of this effort, the Ministry of Information and Communications Technologies (ICT) launched a campaign called "Switch to Public" by offering high-quality, engaging content. This was further supported by international programming and expanded public access to Digital Terrestrial Television (DTT), which improved image and sound quality and reduced the use of the electromagnetic spectrum.

In 2015, the name of Señal Colombia Sistema de Medios Públicos was changed back to RTVC Sistema de Medios Públicos. That same year, the preservation vaults for RTVC Sistema de Medios Públicos' analog archives, known as Señal Memoria, were opened for the first time, safeguarding the audiovisual and sound archives. In 2016, RTVCPlay was created as part of a convergence and digital development strategy, and its app was launched in 2019.

In 2016, following the signing of the peace agreement between the government and the FARC, the creation of peace radio stations was planned in the affected territories, with the first peace radio station being inaugurated in Chaparral, and currently there are 11 peace radio stations in Antioquia, Arauca, Cauca, Chocó, Huila, La Guajira, Meta, Norte de Santander, Putumayo, Tolima and Valle del Cauca.

In 2021, RTVC Noticias was launched for the first time, initially broadcast on Señal Colombia and later in conjunction with Radio Nacional de Colombia.

On April 1, 2026, RTVC Public Media System announced that it would revert to its original name, INRAVISIÓN, after having renewed its programming and content for two years. This also represented a symbolic act with the workers who were in the former entity and a recognition of the public media model focused on the general interest. This change does not alter the legal nature with which it was created when it was originally called RTVC.

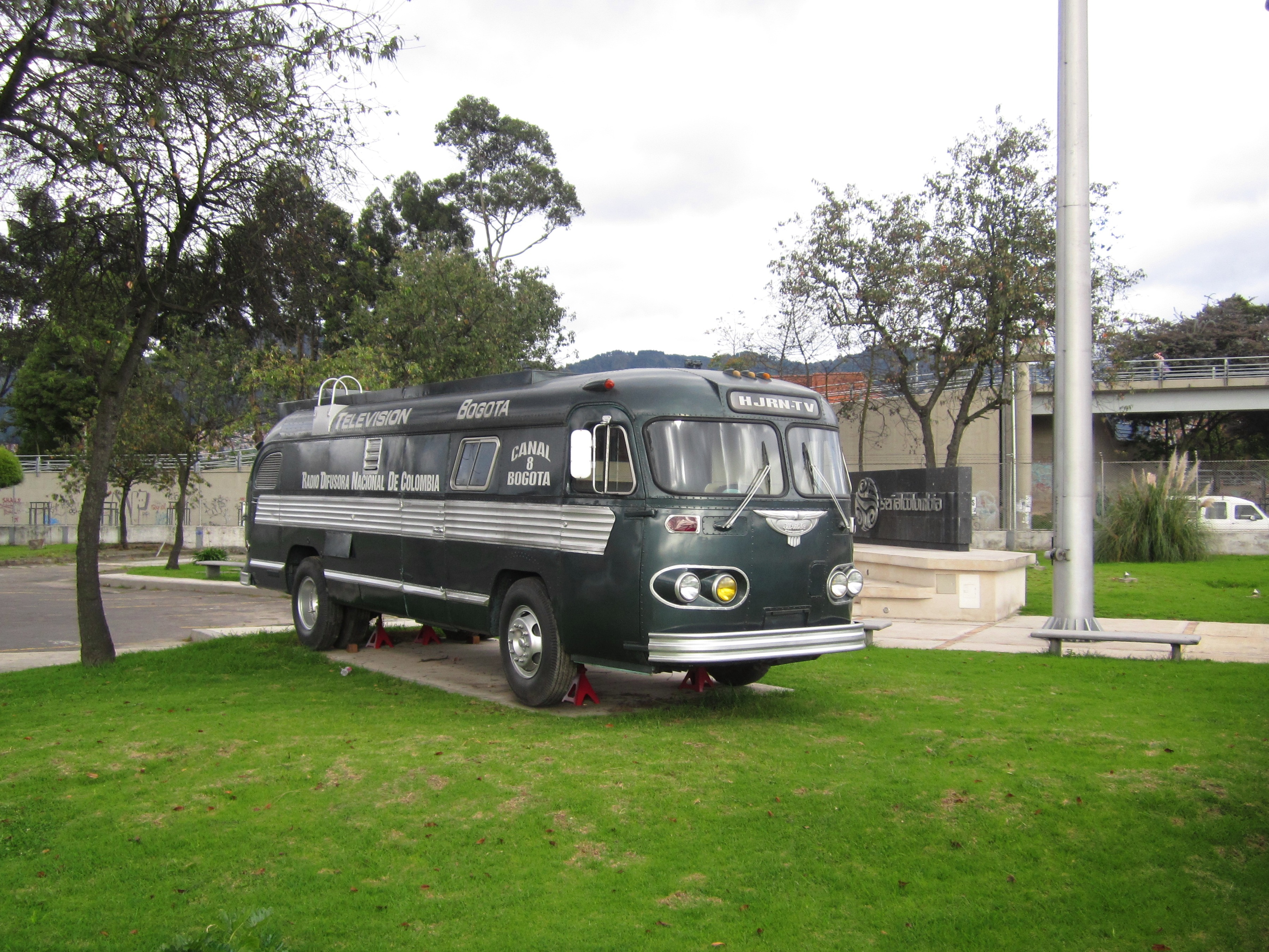
First mobile unit used by the then HJRN-TV in 1954.

== Services ==
RTVC owns four free-to-air television stations (one of which is managed by private businesses) and two radio networks.

== Television ==
=== Terrestrial television ===
Inravision has two channels of national coverage.

==== National channels ====
Inravision is responsible for the operations of the two national channels, which have 97% of their coverage.

Logo	Name	Programming	Foundation	Channels
	Señal Colombia	Main general channel, with cultural, informative, children's, opinion, entertainment and sports programming.	February 9, 1970	Channel 11 (Analog signal); Channel 16.1 (TDT) and repeaters
	Canal Institucional	Executive Institutional Channel, with information programming and national politics, sessions of the Senate and the House of Representatives are also broadcast.	February 2, 2004	Channel 9 (Analog signal); Channel 16.2 (TDT) and repeaters

== Radio ==
Inravision broadcasts 2 stations, on 74 frequencies nationwide, and also operates the peace stations contemplated in point 6.5 of the Peace Agreement signed between the Government and the FARC component.

Logo	Name	Programming	Foundation	Stations	Services
	Radio Nacional de Colombia	First broadcaster, generalist and cultural, provides informative and consultation content on culture, traditions, music, gastronomy, Colombian countryside, politics, economy, artists and others from the country's regions.	February 1, 1940	570 AM (Bogotá/El Rosal); 95.9 FM (Bogotá); Channel 16.5 (TDT, audio) and repeaters	Exploremos: Online radio station with educational and musical content for students, parents, teachers, and anyone interested in learning, available on DTT and streaming.
	Radiónica	Second station, musical, its programming is focused on a youth audience based on rock and alternative music with occasional rotation of metal, electronic, pop, reggae, ska and hip hop.	October 15, 2005	99.1 FM; Channel 16.4 (TDT, audio) and repeaters	Radiónica: A music radio station for young people featuring the most important news about music, TV series, movies, and culture, with programming focused on rock, hip hop, electronic, reggae, metal, ska, pop, and other alternative sounds. Radiónica Online: An online station that broadcasts all of Radiónica's live programming.

=== Disappeared radio stations ===
Name	Programming	Foundation	Radio Stations
Señal Clásica	Online radio station broadcasting classical music, with programming based on the Señal Memoria archives.		Online
Señal Andina	Online radio station that broadcast music from the Andean region.		Online
Señal Llanera	Online radio station that broadcast music from the Llanos region.		Online
+Colombia	Online radio station that broadcast Colombian music.		Online
Radiónica 2	Online radio station that broadcast rap music.		Online
Radiónica 3	Online radio station that broadcasts rock music.		Online

== Peace Radio Stations ==
In compliance with point 6.5 of the Peace Agreement between the Colombian government and the FARC-EP, signed between the Colombian government and the Revolutionary Armed Forces of Colombia (FARC), Inravisión Public Media System operates 20 stations of Radio Nacional de Colombia, which were fully operational as of December 2024.

These peace radio stations broadcast cultural, musical, and informational content highlighting regional cultures, entrepreneurship, and projects, with a focus on educating the public about the content of the Final Agreement.

The frequencies of the radio stations currently in operation are:

- Arauquita (Arauca): 88.9
- San José del Guaviare (Guaviare): 90.6
- Florida (Valle del Cauca): 92.0
- Fonseca (La Guajira): 92.2
- Ituango (Antioquia): 92.3
- Algeciras (Huila): 92.6
- San Vicente del Caguán (Caquetá): 93.3
- Convención (Norte de Santander): 94.0
- Mesetas (Meta): 94.0
- El Tambo (Cauca): 96.7
- Fundación (Magdalena): 97.3
- Bojayá (Chocó): 98.5
- Puerto Leguizamo (Putumayo): 100.3
- San Jacinto (Bolívar): 102.7
- Chaparral (Tolima): 103.5
- Tumaco (Nariño): 104.6
- Agustín Codazzi (Cesar): 106.3
- Buenaventura (Valle del Cauca): 104.9
- Tierralta (Córdoba): 102.7
- Riosucio (Chocó): 89.6

The stations also broadcast online.

== OTT Platform ==
Name	Services
Señal Memoria	It is the most important audiovisual archive in Colombia that preserves approximately 170,000 audiovisual and sound documents, produced and broadcast by the National Radio since 1940 and by national public television since 1954, as well as film material produced since the 1940s. The documents in the catalog are divided and organized into the following collections: History and Political Situation, Culture and Society, History of the Media and Colombia and the World. Signal Memoria's mission is also to safeguarding the country's sound and audiovisual archive through the creation of its own content such as The Voice of Power, a transmedia project that analyzes the speech of Colombian presidents since the mid-20th century, or The Stories of Diana Uribe, a podcast to learn about the natural and cultural diversity of Colombia.
RTVCPlay	It is the free online entertainment platform of the Public Media System, with content from the Colombian audiovisual industry, originals, acquisitions and Inravision brands, such as series, films, documentaries, children's programs and podcasts. Its catalog contains feature films that have marked the history of the country such as La vendedora de rosas, The Millionaire Taxi Driver, Dog Eat Dog, A Man of Principle, and Embrace of the Serpent, among others.

== News operation ==
INRAVISIÓN also connects citizens with local, national and international information through RTVC Noticias and Señal de la Mañana.

Name	Services
RTVC Noticias	RTVC Noticias is the Colombian Public Media System's first newscast, with a focus on regions and relevant content that contributes to building citizenship. With correspondents in major cities around the world, it has a special focus on the regions, with its own journalists and the support of the Radio Nacional team in municipalities where no other media outlet reaches. It collaborates with all of the system's platforms as well as features special coverage and breaking news bulletins. This news is broadcast from Monday to Friday, at 12 noon and 7:00 p.m., as well as on weekends and holidays, at 7:00 p.m.
El Calentao Informativo	El Calentao Informativo is Inravision's morning news program on Radio Nacional de Colombia and Señal Colombia, with a convergent offering across television, social media, and digital platforms. With a team of journalists spread across the country from San Andrés to Leticia, El Calentao Informativo can be heard from 6:00 to 10:00 a.m. across Radio Nacional de Colombia's 73 frequencies, including the Peace Stations, and can also be seen on Señal Colombia.

== Managers ==
- Gilberto Ramírez (2004-2005)
- Eduardo Osorio Lozano (2005-2007)
- Katy Osorio Guachetá (2007-2010)
- Douglas Velásquez Jácome (2010-2011)
- Francisco Ortiz Rebolledo (2011-2012)
- Darío Montenegro (2012-2013)
- Diana Celis Mora (2013-2014)
- Lucy Osorno Sánchez (2014-2015)
- Jhon Jairo Ocampo (2015-2017)
- José Jorge Dangond Castro (2017-2018)
- Juan Pablo Bieri (2018-2019)
- Juan Ramón Samper Samper (2019-2020)
- Álvaro García Jiménez (2020-2022)
- Adriana Vásquez Sánchez (2022-2023) (interim)
- Nórida Rodríguez (2023-2024)
- Hollman Morris (2024-2026)
