= Señal Colombia =

Colombian public TV channel

- Type: Public broadcast television network
- Country: Colombia
- Broadcast area: Colombia

Programming
- Picture format: 1080i HDTV (upscaled to 16:9 480i for the channel's standard resolution signal)

Ownership
- Owner: Government of Colombia (publicly operated by RTVC Sistema de Medios Públicos)
- Key people: Hollman Morris (Manager of RTVC); Silvana Orlandelli (Channel Director)
- Sister channels: Canal Institucional

History
- Launched: February 9, 1970; 56 years ago
- Founder: Carlos Lleras Restrepo
- Former names: Canal 11 (1970-1973); Tercera Cadena (1974-1979); Tercera Cadena Color (1979-1983); Cadena 3 o Canal de Interés Público (1984-1991); Canal 3 (1992-1995)

Links
- Website: https://www.senalcolombia.tv

Availability

Terrestrial
- Digital UHF: Channel 16.1
- Analog VHF/UHF: Listings may vary

Señal Colombia (Spanish pronunciation: [seɲˈal kolˈombja]) is a Colombian public Terrestrial television channel, which offers opinion, informative, entertainment, educational, sports and cultural content and is part of Inravisión Sistema de Medios Públicos.

== History ==
Señal Colombia began its broadcasts on February 9, 1970 as Channel 11 (because it was broadcast on frequency 11 of the VHF band of Bogotá) in order to provide educational and popular programming for adults, imitating the television model of the BBC with two national channels: the first of a general nature and the second with a more cultural and minority focus. In this way, in Colombia Televisora Nacional de Colombia would be the generalist channel and Channel 11 the cultural channel.

The first images of the channel were produced from the auditorium of Inravisión. During the inauguration of Channel 11, the communications minister of the time, Antonio Díaz García, and the director of the National Television of Colombia, Fernando Restrepo Suárez. In the words of the director of the National Televisora de Colombia, the channel "would not be a formula to bridge cultural gaps nor did it intend to replace the work of the teacher, but it would serve as a great audiovisual aid to fill those cultural gaps present in all levels of education". Initially, its signal was only available in Bogotá; the goal was to finish its national transmitter network by 1973.

After the private station Teletigre was expropriated by the State in 1971, it expanded its coverage nationwide in January 1974 and was replaced by Segunda Cadena, while Televisora Nacional was rebranded Primera Cadena; and Channel 11 changes its name to Tercera Cadena or "Channel of public interest".

In 1984, Channel 3 is renamed Network 3 - Channel of public interest; Finally, in 1992 it changed its name to Channel 3 (with a launch event at the National Museum) and from December 1995 it acquired its current name as Señal Colombia.

On March 21, 2021, the newscast RTVC Noticias was launched and that this is the second State newscast of Colombian television after Tele Noticias for the programming of Audiovisuales.

== Programming ==
Since its inception, the channel has always had a vocation for public service, broadcasting cultural and educational programming. During the last years of Inravisión, Señal Colombia broadcast sessions of the Senate and the House of Representatives, in addition to other programs of an institutional nature, but in 2004 this programming was transferred to Canal Institucional, which replaced Canal A (former Second Chain).

Señal Colombia broadcasts children's programs, documentaries, family films, international films and independent films, newscasts, fiction, among other things. This has made the channel considerably increase its popularity.

The channel has broadcast numerous national and international sporting events, such as the Olympic Games, Paralympic Games, Pan American Games, Central American and Caribbean Games, Bolivarian Games, and National Games of Colombia, as well as the Grand Tours and other road cycling races.
