= Carina Murcia =

Colombian social communicator (born 1990)

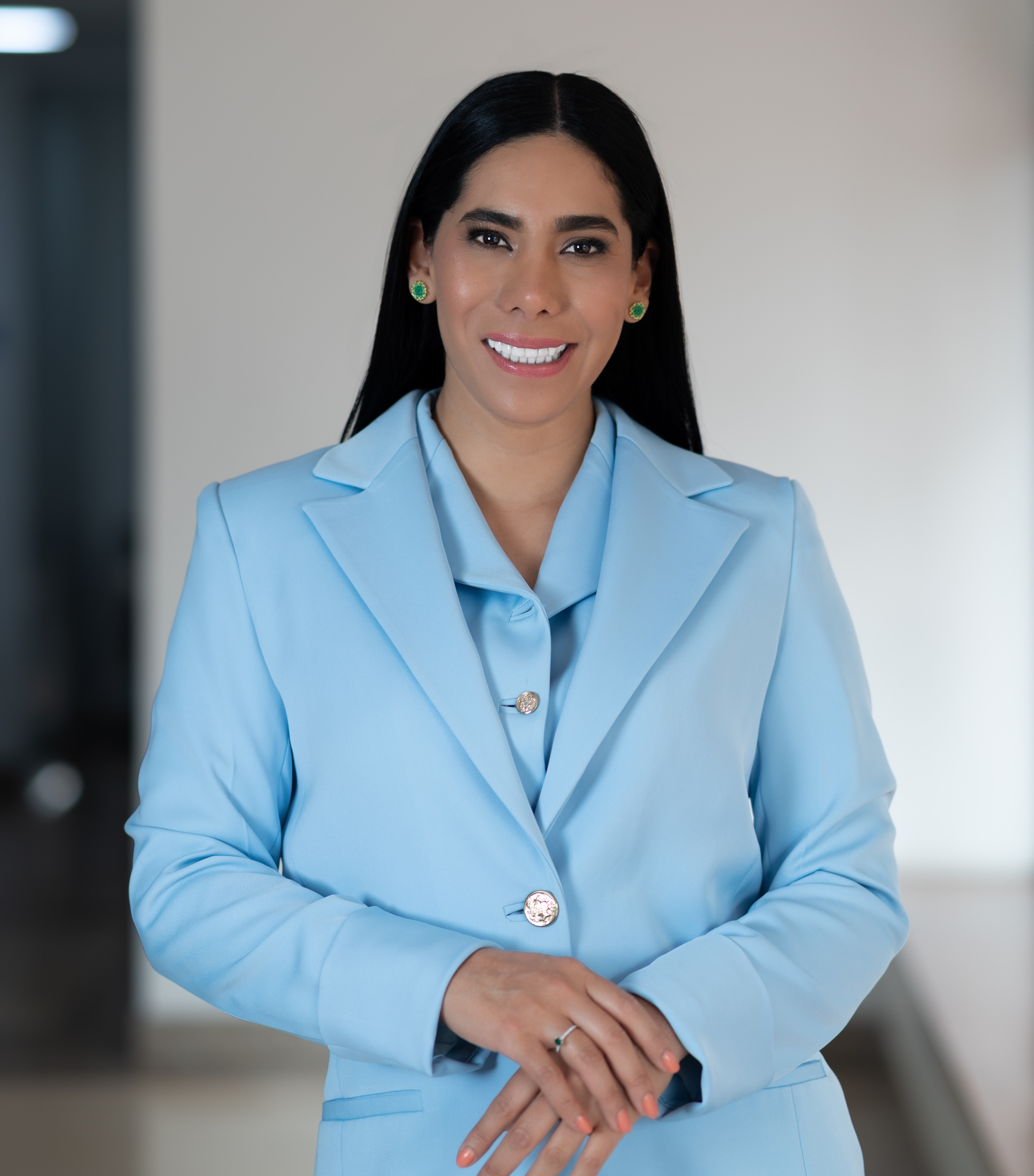
- Official portrait, 2025

Minister of Information and Communications Technology
- In office September 21, 2025 – August 7, 2026
- President: Gustavo Petro
- Preceded by: Julián Molina
- Succeeded by: Alexandra Falla

Deputy Minister of Digital Transformation
- In office September 9, 2025 – September 21, 2025
- President: Gustavo Petro
- Preceded by: Belfor García
- Succeeded by: Vacant

Personal details
- Born: Yeimi Carina Murcia Yela; 1990 (age 35–36) Puerto Asís, Putumayo, Colombia
- Party: Historic Pact (2025-present)
- Other political affiliations: Humane Colombia (2019-2025); Historic Pact for Colombia (2022-2025)
- Education: Cooperative University of Colombia (BA); Universidad Externado de Colombia (BSc)

Yeimi Carina Murcia Yela (born c. 1990) is a Colombian social communicator and politician who served as Minister of Information and Communications Technology from 2025 to 2026 under President Gustavo Petro.

Born in Puerto Asís, Putumayo, she holds a degree in social communication from the Cooperative University of Colombia.

In 2023 she worked as an advisor to the Ministry of Health and Social Protection under Minister Guillermo Alfonso Jaramillo, later serving as director of ICT appropriation, in 2025 she assumed the position of Deputy Minister of Digital Transformation and was then appointed and subsequently confirmed by President Gustavo Petro as Minister of Information and Communications Technology

== Early life ==
Yeimi Carina Murcia Yela was born in c. 1990 in Puerto Asís, Putumayo. Her parents fled Puerto Asís for Yacopí, Cundinamarca, when she was four years old due to the armed conflict. She studied social communication at the Cooperative University of Colombia. She holds a specialization in government, management, and public affairs from Universidad Externado de Colombia and more later a master's degree in human rights, democracy and globalisation from the Open University of Catalonia.

== Political career ==
In 2022, she began working at the Ministry of Information and Communications Technologies as an advisor under Minister Sandra Urrutia. In 2023, she served as Director of Appropriation, initially under Minister Mauricio Lizcano and later under Minister Julián Molina after Lizcano's resignation.

In September 2025, she was appointed Deputy Minister of Digital Transformation, and subsequently, on September 21, she assumed the position of Minister of Information and Communications Technologies following Julián Molina's resignation.

Political offices
Preceded by Belfor García	Deputy Minister of Digital Transformation; 2025	Vacant
Preceded by Julián Molina	Minister of Information Technologies and Communications; 2025-2026	Succeeded by Alexandra Falla
