= María del Rosario Guerra =

Colombian economist and politician

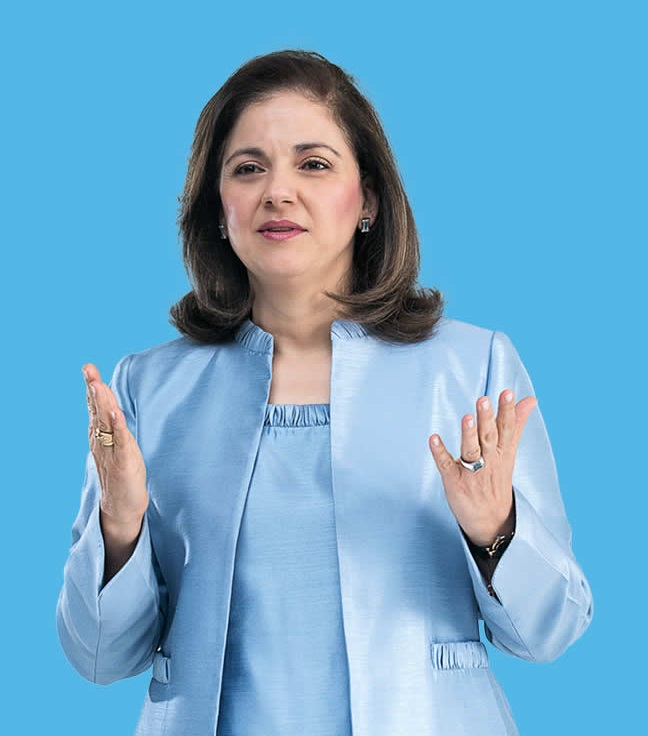

Senator of Colombia
- Incumbent
- Assumed office 20 June 2014

Minister of Information Technologies and Communications
- In office 19 July 2006 – 31 January 2010
- President: Alvaro Uribe
- Preceded by: Martha Pinto de Hart
- Succeeded by: Daniel Enrique Medina V.

Personal details
- Born: María del Rosario Guerra de La Espriella; 15 October 1961 (age 65) Sincelejo, Sucre, Colombia
- Party: Democratic Center
- Spouse: Jens Mesa Dishington
- Children: 3
- Education: Universidad del Rosario (B.A) Harvard University (M.P.A) Cornell University (MSc)

María del Rosario Guerra de La Espriella (15 October 1961) is a Colombian economist, professor and politician who has served as Senator since 2014. She was elected under a newly created political party, the Democratic Center, which is led by former Colombian President Alvaro Uribe. Guerra was the Minister of Communications under President Uribe from July 2006 until January 2010. In March 2017, Guerra announced her candidacy for President of Colombia.

== Career ==
Guerra is an economist from Del Rosario University. She also received a Masters in Public Administration from Harvard University and a Masters in Agricultural Economy from Cornell University. She is a professor at Del Rosario University, University of the Andes and the National University of Colombia. Guerra had previously held roles as Vice Chancellor of Del Rosario University and also served as Director of the Administrative Department of Science, Technology and Innovation - Colciencias.

She was appointed Minister of Communications during the second term of President Alvaro Uribe. One of her main contributions was to implement the Law of Technologies of Information and Communication, TIC (Law 1341 of 2009), Law on the Services Postcards (Law 1369 of 2009) and led programs to expand internet access to marginalised regions of Colombia by expanding the Digital Citizen initiative.

== Political career ==
In March 2014, she was elected Senator of the Republic for the period 2014–2018 under the Democratic Center, a political movement created and led by Uribe. Guerra became the de facto deputy leader of the Democratic Center in the Senate behind Uribe, who was also elected Senator. In March 2017, Guerra launched a bid for her party's nomination for the 2018 presidential election, but withdrew her name in November.

She was reelected as senator of Colombia for the period 2018-2022. She is part of the economic commission of the Senate and also the decentralization commission. She is the coordinator of the pro life commission in the Senate and the commission for combating hunger and malnutrition.
