= Radio Nacional de Colombia =

Public radio network in Colombia

Coordinates: 4.6376708°N 74.0924707°W

- Colombia
- Broadcast area: Colombia
- Frequencies: (among others) 95.9 MHz (FM), 570 kHz (AM)
- Branding: HJIN (FM), HJND (AM)

Programming
- Format: News, talk, music, culture
- Affiliations: Republic of Colombia

Ownership
- Owner: Ministry of Information Technologies and Communications; Government of Colombia (publicly operated by RTVC Sistema de Medios Públicos)

History
- First air date: 1 February 1940 (as Radiodifusora Nacional de Colombia)

Links
- Website: radionacional.co

Radio Nacional de Colombia ("Colombian National Radio") is a Colombian state-owned public radio network, part of Señal Colombia RTVC. It was launched – as Radiodifusora Nacional de Colombia – on 1 February 1940, three years after closure of the country's first state-owned radio station, HJN.

Between 1954 and 1963, Radiodifusora Nacional was also responsible for National Television, then the only television network in the country.

As of 2019, the network broadcasts news and information from state and other institutional agencies in addition to coverage of all aspects of Colombian culture in programmes grouped under the heading Colombiología, with the motto Colombiología al aire ("Colombiology on the air").

Broadcasting on both AM and FM, Radio Nacional covers Colombia's 32 departmental capitals, including Bogotá, as well as a number of other medium-sized municipalities.

== Frequencies ==
Radio Nacional is heard in various cities across the country via the following AM and FM frequencies. It is also available on channel 16.5 of digital terrestrial television in Colombia.

List of frequencies of Radio Nacional de Colombia:

City	Department	AM Frequency (Call Sign)	FM Frequency (Call Sign)
Bogotá	Bogotá	570 HJND	95.9 HJIN
Barranquilla	Atlántico	680 HJZO	98.1 HJXV
Santa Marta	Magdalena	680 HJZO	98.1 HJXV
Riohacha	La Guajira		98.1 HJXV
Cartagena	Bolívar		91.1 HJXB
Valledupar	Cesar		97.7 HJXJ
San Andrés Islas	San Andrés y Providencia		99.5 HJXP
Ovejas	Sucre		89.8 HJP62
Sincelejo	Sucre		89.8 HJP62
Ibagué	Tolima		101.1 HKC26
Ataco	Tolima		106.5 HJP80
Leticia	Amazonas		95.5 HKR74
Puerto Nariño	Amazonas		102.9 HJD27
Ituango	Antioquia		106.5 HJD35
Chigorodó	Antioquia		89.3 HJYN
Tarazá	Antioquia		103.3 HJG80
Medellín	Antioquia		99.9 HJXA
Arauca	Arauca		92.3 HJPG
Saravena	Arauca		98.3 HJH22
Chiquinquirá	Boyacá		95.3 HJXD
Tunja	Boyacá	560 HJGS	97.3 HJXE
Manizales y Pereira	Caldas; Risaralda	1000 HJJG	92.7 HJXF
San Vicente del Caguán	Colombia		94.3 HJXH
Florencia	Colombia		96.3 HJXG
Yopal	Casanare		92.7 HJYO
Quibdó	Chocó		95.3 HJZ76
Bolívar	Cauca		104.5 HJD37
Popayán	Cauca		90.1 HJXI
El Plateado	Cauca		91.6 HJI95
Facatativá	Cundinamarca		95.4 HJYQ
Puerto Inirida	Guainía		92.3 HJYE
San José del Guaviare	Guaviare		96.3 HJYG
Garzón	Huila		94.3 HJYT
Neiva	Huila		94.3 HJXK
Villavicencio	Meta		100.1 HJXN
Pasto	Nariño		93.5 HJYV
Samaniego	Nariño		107.9 HJD33
Cúcuta	Norte de Santander		96.9 HJZC
El Carmen	Norte de Santander		104.7 HJO40
Pamplona	Norte de Santander		97.9 HJXO
Mocoa	Putumayo		98.3 HJZJ
Puerto Leguizamo	Putumayo		102.7 HJD28
San Miguel	Putumayo		105.9 HJD29
Valle del Guamuez	Putumayo		92.7 HJD30
Armenia	Quindío		98.7 HJZK
Barrancabermeja	Santander		94.7 HJXT
Bucaramanga	Santander		92.3 HJZM
Málaga	Santander		92.3 HJZN
San Gil	Santander		93.7 HJP41
Cali	Valle del Cauca		94.5 HJXU
Mitú	Vaupés		88.3 HJA68
Puerto Carreño	Vichada		94.3 HJYL
Montería	Córdoba		98.5 HJYP
Ituango(*)	Antioquia		92.3 HJ645
Chaparral(*)	Tolima		103.5 HJE80
Fonseca(*)	La Guajira		92.2 HJF83
Convención(*)	Norte de Santander		94.0 HJF82
San Jacinto(*)	Bolívar		102.7 HJF84
Florida(*)	Valle del Cauca		92.0 HJQ60
Buenaventura(*)	Valle del Cauca		104.9 HJZ31
Arauquita(*)	Arauca		88.9 HJHG
Algeciras(*)	Huila		92.6 HJJM
Bojayá(*)	Chocó		98.5 HJS67
Riosucio(*)	Chocó		89.6 HJW38
Puerto Leguizamo(*)	Putumayo		100.3 HJJ20
El Tambo(*)	Cauca		96.7 HJIC
Mesetas(*)	Meta		94.0 HJU43
San José del Guaviare(*)	Guaviare		90.6 HJV91
San Vicente del Caguán(*)	Caquetá		93.3 HJV73
Fundación(*)	Magdalena		97.3 HJV84
Tumaco(*)	Nariño		104.6 HJV85
Tierralta(*)	Córdoba		102.7 HJW42
Agustín Codazzi(*)	Cesar		106.3 HJW40

(*) Station installed in compliance with Point 6.5 of the Peace Agreement between the Colombian Government and the FARC, with the purpose of reporting on the progress of implementation and strengthening pedagogy for peace. Sources:
