= The Millionaire Taxi Driver =

- Original movie poster for El taxista millonario
- Directed by: Gustavo Nieto Roa
- Starring: Carlos Benjumea, Rosa Gloria Chagoyán
- Cinematography: Mario González
- Music by: Roberto Campuzano
- Distributed by: Centauro Films y Cine Colombia
- Release date: 25 December 1979
- Running time: 98 minutes
- Country: Colombia
- Language: Spanish

The Millionaire Tax Driver (Spanish: El taxista millonario) is a Colombian comedy film released in December 1979 directed by Gustavo Nieto Roa and starring Carlos "El Gordo" Benjumea and Rosa Gloria Chagoyán.

== Plot ==
José, nicknamed Pepe, is a taxi driver in Bogotá. He drives a 1946 ramshackle taxi that is falling apart and repeatedly breaks down. His mother and three younger brothers depend on José to support the family. Despite his struggles, José lives his life with joy and optimism. José nicknames his taxi brand new (El Nuevecito), as he wants to restore it. When José takes his taxi to a workshop belonging to the taxi cooperative, he also meets Juan 'Polilla' (Jorge Zuluaga), a neighbor and friend who is a security guard for the cooperative and they both have a few beers in a nearby store. While they talk about 'Polilla's' security job, Julio, another neighbor of theirs, appears in the same store and overhears them talking about how easy it is to rob the taxi cooperative and 'Polilla' will be the security guard that same night.

That same night, José arrives at a cabaret where José becomes infatuated with a beautiful nightclub showgirl vedette, Verónica, and offers to be her driver to get her away from her obsessed manager. The next day, José faces the economic crisis of his home because the taxi, being a very old car that spends more time in the workshop, prevents José from working it well and earning his daily living. José has as neighbors Matilde (Delfina Guido) and her daughter María (Jaqueline Henrriquez), a clumsy girl who claims that José is her boyfriend. Both practically force José to take them in his taxi to run an errand. Later, at the store, José meets his best friend Don Poncho, an elderly lottery seller who has recently been ill. After playing a game of billiards with Don Poncho, José then continues his workday as a taxi driver, returning to the theater-cabaret where, after teasing the doorman (who prevents him from entering because he is dressed too casually), he manages to enter the theater and Verónica asks him for help with her personal items so she can then get in the taxi. But when José makes advances on Verónica, but she rejects him due to his economic condition and even more so when her taxi breaks down once again and she is picked up, ironically, by her obsessed manager.

The next day, while José is washing the taxi, accidentally getting Matilde wet, 'Polilla's' wife tells José and his neighbors that her husband had been killed during a robbery at the taxi cooperative. Then, José tries to look for Don Poncho in the store but the shopkeeper tells him that Don Poncho needs José at home. During 'Polilla's' funeral, two police detectives try to interrogate the widow in order to catch the criminals. After robbing a bank, the gang of robbers becomes involved in a shutout with the police. Two of the robbers stop José's taxi at gunpoint and force him to help them escape. As the robbers run from the taxi, they apparently leave behind two bags containing millions of pesos. José hides the money, spending it on gifts and provisions for his family, on a new taxi, on new clothes, and on impressing Verónica, who changes her mind about José. Graciela (Chela del Río), José's mother, believes that José won the lottery. The thieves go to the taxi cooperative looking for José and the mechanic Roberto Beltrán, unaware that they are thieves, he naively reveals that José has made a lot of money and plans to restore his taxi, in addition to inviting him to a party that will be held in the neighborhood.

But when José brings Verónica to the neighborhood party, María, her mother and Graciela create a scandal while the thieves, invited to the party by Roberto, try to get José's money believing that he kept the loot, but José escapes with Verónica. The police analyze the fingerprints found at the taxi cooperative, and discover that Julio, a neighbor of José and 'Polilla', is responsible for both the murder of the security guard and the robbery of the taxi cooperative.

José escapes with Verónica to a nearby town, but when they return to Bogotá, José asks her to marry him, but accompanied by mariachis, Verónica refuses despite being in love. After leaving Verónica at her house, José returns to his own where the robbers are waiting for him. A comical chase ensues and the robbers surround José in a park. José confronts them imitating martial arts, but the robbers take out their weapons and beat him up and demand his money.

Upon being captured by the police, Julio claims to have only visited 'Polilla' on the night of the assault and affirms that José was the one who assaulted the taxi cooperative, which was the supposed origin of his fortune. The police suspect José of being one of the robbers. José is also pursued by the robbers inside the cabaret where the other showgirls disguise him so he can hide and escape, and then the robbers kidnap Verónica and demand he return the money. As José attempts to return the money, he is followed by the police. The police seize the money and arrest the robbers as well as José and Verónica.

At the trial, the prosecuting attorney is asking that the thieves be sentenced to 30 years in prison. Jose's lawyer asks the court to tell his version of the events; The money that José obtained had been inherited from Don Poncho, who had died a day after 'Polilla', and in whose agony he had not only inherited the money but several lottery tickets. Seconds before dying, Don Poncho asked José as his last wish to give him a decent burial, which José complied with and visited him regularly in the cemetery. Ironically, that same day had been the robbery of the bank where José had been forced by the robbers to help them escape. One of the robbers clarified that they had boarded a bus later and forgotten the bags with the stolen money, claiming to feel sorry for sharing the money, which unleashed the anger of the gang leaders in court. With this, José persuades the court that he is innocent even the robbery of the taxi cooperative. The actual robbers are sentenced to 30 years in prison. The prosecuting attorney is not convinced of José's total innocence and asks for more evidence. José shows him the lottery tickets, among which is the number that turns out to be the winner of the jackpot, which is reported by a man in the audience who was reading the newspaper. José learns that a lottery ticket he received from the late Don Poncho is the winner. José with his loved ones and the public celebrates, and the thieves, taking advantage of the fun, try to escape. Good triumphs and José is rewarded

== Production information ==
The film was directed by Gustavo Nieto Roa. It was one of several film collaborations between Nieto Roa and Carlos Benjumea. Nieto Roa wrote the screenplay with Ignacio Ramírez. The theme music that recurs throughout the film was composed by Roberto Campuzano. Mario González was the cinematographer. The film was released on Christmas Day in 2007, and distributed by Centauro Films and Cine Colombia. The film had a running time of 98 minutes.

== Themes and reception ==
Though presented as a comedy, Nieto Roa described the film as "a serious study on the middle class."

The film was enormously popular. For more than a decade, it was the highest grossing film in the history of Colombian cinema, and it remained in second place for another 30 years.

In his book "Cine y nación", Simón Puerta Domínguez described it as "Nieto Roa's film that best represents the continuity of affirmative melodramatic cinema, as well as its transformation to the ambiguous and incredulous context of the time."

== Cast ==
- Carlos "El Gordo" Benjumea, as José Inocencio Luna, the cab driver.
- Rosa Gloria Chagoyán, as Verónica, the night club star
- Jaqueline Henríquez, as María
- Delfina Guido, as Matilde
- Chela del Río, as Graciela, José's mother
- Jairo Soto, as Leovigildo Holguín 'Mano Rubia', the co-leader of the thieves
- Humberto Arango, as Ignacio Samper, head of the gang of robbers.
- Hector Laos, as Andrés Vesga 'Cara Sucia', thief
- Mario Sastre, as Mr. Albán, José's attorney
- Marina García, as Neighbor
- Jorge Santafe, as Detective
- Víctor Hugo Cabrera, as Raul, José's brother
- Ernesto Benjumea, as Ernesto, Jose's child brother
- José Saldarriaga, as Roberto Beltrán, mechanic and garage owner
- Alberto Saavedra, as Captain
- Luis Chiappe, as Don Poncho, lottery vendor
- Margalida Castro, as Traffic officer
- Alfredo González, as prosecuting attorney
- Hugo Patiño, as satyr man in the pool
