= HJN =

Colombian radio station

HJN was the first Colombian radio station, owned and operated by the Colombian state through its Ministry of Education.

In 1924, during the administration of President Pedro Nel Ospina, some lands in Puente Aranda were reserved for a Telefunken transmitter. The studio was initially located inside the National Capitol.

On 5 September 1929, during the administration of President Miguel Abadía Méndez, broadcasts started, with a series of speeches from a theatre in Chapinero and music by Alejandro Wills and Pedro Morales Pino. In downtown Bogotá, the first programme was heard by a crowd which listened to speakers installed by the government.

The programming alternated news bulletins, classical music, and live concerts. During a period of time, some time slots were rented to private citizens and commercial ads were broadcast, until the administration of Enrique Olaya Herrera. Cultural and educational programming increased during 1932–1933, when Daniel Samper Ortega, director of the National Library of Colombia, became the director of HJN.

The station closed in November 1937, during the first administration of Alfonso López Pumarejo, for financial and technical reasons. HJN would be succeeded by the Radiodifusora Nacional de Colombia, which started broadcasts 1 February 1940.
