= Radiónica =

Colombian radio station

Coordinates: 4.6376708°N 74.0924707°W

Radiónica Bogotá
- Colombia
- Broadcast area: Bogotá, Colombia
- Frequency: 99.1 MHz
- Branding: HJYM

Programming
- Format: Music, culture, talk
- Affiliations: RTVC Sistema de Medios Públicos

Ownership
- Owner: Ministry of Information Technologies and Communications; Government of Colombia (publicly operated by RTVC Sistema de Medios Públicos)

History
- First air date: January 6, 1995 (as 99-1 Frecuencia Joven); October 15, 2005 (as Radiónica)

Links
- Website: radionica.rocks

Radiónica is a Colombian state-owned music radio network, formerly known as 99-1 Frecuencia Joven ("Young Frequency"). It belongs to the National Radio Television of Colombia, Colombia's state-owned national broadcaster.

The network broadcast mainly independently-made music covering many genres, mostly rock, electronica, and metal, with some hip hop and reggae. It also promotes and broadcasts many Colombian artists.

In 2005, Bogotá's 99.1 FM would become Radiónica, during that year's Rock al Parque festival in Bogotá. It was known as Señal Radiónica between 2013 and 2015.

Radiónica added its first station outside Bogotá in 2006, with HJXP 99.5 MHz in San Andrés Islas. Later it would expand to Cartagena, Cali and Medellín (2007), and other cities in 2009.

The radio station was directed by Alvaro Gonzalez Villamarin from 2005 to 2019. During that period of time, it became known as Repitionica, due to its insistent play of a small number of songs the director liked, while ignoring other important releases in the music industry at the time.

== Frequencies ==
- Barranquilla/Riohacha/Santa Marta HJXL 95.1 FM (licensed to the latter)
- Bogotá HJYM 99.1 FM (flagship station)
- Cali HJXU 94.5 FM (licensed to Buga)
- Cartagena HJXB 91.1 FM
- Málaga HJZN 92.3 FM
- Medellín HJXA 99.9 MHz
- San Andrés HJXP 99.5 MHz
- Pereira HJD45 95.6 MHz

Radiónica is also available as an audio virtual subchannel on areas with digital terrestrial television coverage at virtual channel 16.4.
