= David Luna Sánchez =

Colombian politician

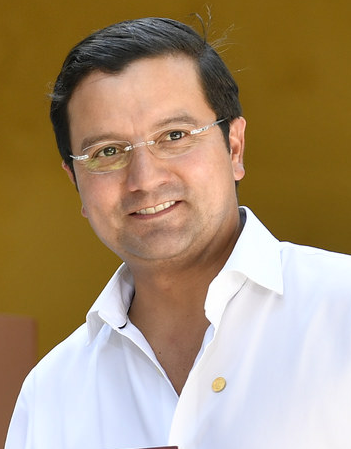

Minister of Information Technologies and Communications
- In office May 15, 2015 – April 25, 2018
- President: Juan Manuel Santos
- Preceded by: Diego Molano Vega
- Succeeded by: Juan Sebastián Rozo

Deputy Minister of Labor
- In office December 5, 2011 – February 1, 2013
- President: Juan Manuel Santos

Member of the Chamber of Representatives
- In office July 20, 2006 – July 20, 2010
- Constituency: Bogotá

Member of the Senate of Colombia
- In office 2021–2025

Personal details
- Born: February 27, 1975 (age 50) Bogotá, Colombia
- Political party: Independent (1997-2000); Liberal Party (2000-2018); Radical Change (2018-2025); Independent (2025-present)
- Education: Universidad del Rosario Universidad Externado de Colombia
- Profession: Lawyer, Politician

David Luna Sánchez (born February 27, 1975) is a Colombian lawyer, politician, and former Minister of Information Technologies and Communications. He represented Bogotá in the Chamber of Representatives of Colombia between 2006 and 2010 and was a member of the Senate of Colombia from 2021 to 2025.

== Education ==
Luna Sánchez studied at the National University of Rosario where he graduated with a degree in Administrative Law. He later earned a master's degree in government and public policy from the Universidad Externado de Colombia.

== Career ==
From 2006 to 2010, he represented Bogotá in the House of Representatives as a member of the Colombian Liberal Party. Under President Juan Manuel Santos, he served as Minister of Information Technologies and Communications from May 2015 to April 2018.

In December 2021, Luna was elected to the Senate as the primary candidate of the Radical Change Party; he resigned in 2025 to pursue an independent campaign in the 2026 Colombian presidential election.
