= Telefónica Colombia =

Telefónica subsidiary in Colombia

- Type: Public-private partnership
- Industry: Telecommunications
- Founded: May 23, 1947
- Founder: Mariano Ospina Pérez
- Headquarters: Bogotá, Colombia
- Area served: Colombia
- Products: CDMA, WiMax, WiFi, VoIP, Mobitex, Long distance, Internet services, BlackBerrys
- Owner: Telefónica (70%), Colombian government (30%)

Telefónica Colombia is the largest telecommunications company in Colombia. The company was established in 1947 by Mariano Ospina Pérez. It is owned by the Spanish telecommunications company Telefónica and the Colombian government; the Colombian government has a 32.5% stake in Telefónica Colombia but is trying to sell that under favourable conditions for the sale. The company is headquartered in Bogotá.

== See also ==
- Telecommunications companies of Colombia
