= Sandra Urrutia =

Colombian lawyer and specializing in telecommunications

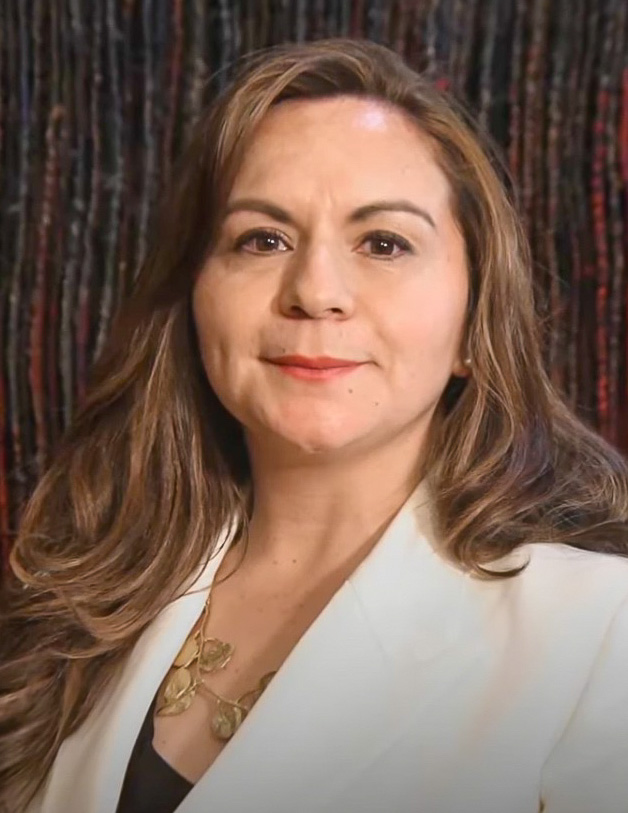

Minister of Information Technologies and Communications
- In office September 5, 2022 – April 26, 2023
- President: Gustavo Petro
- Preceded by: Carmen Ligia Valderrama
- Succeeded by: Mauricio Lizcano

Personal details
- Born: Sandra Milena Urrutia Pérez; September 20, 1978 (age 47) Aquitania, Boyacá, Colombia
- Party: Party of the U
- Education: University of Boyacá

Sandra Milena Urrutia Pérez (born September 20, 1978) is a Colombian lawyer specializing in telecommunications and administrative law from 2022 to 2023 as the Minister of Information and Communication Technologies.

Urrutia has held various public and private positions as a telecommunications legal advisor and administrator. In 2002, she began her career in the public sector as a legal adviser to the Superintendence of Residential Public Services and became a director in said entity. Later she was a legal advisor to the Communications Regulation Commission. She was coordinator of surveillance and control of the National Television Authority.

== Early life ==
She was born on September 20 in the city of Aquitania in the department of Boyacá. She grew up in the city of Sogamoso, there she studied at the Sugamuxi College from which she graduated as a bachelor in 1995.

She studied law at the University of Boyacá, specialized in Telecommunications Law at the Universidad del Rosario and a master's degree in administrative law at the Universidad Externado.

== Trajectory ==
Between 2014 and 2016 she moved to the private sector as coordinator of regulation, legal management and competition for Telefónica Colombia.

In 2016, she was legal advisor to the vice-ministry of connectivity and digitization of the ICT ministry during the mandate of Juan Manuel Santos, with David Luna being the minister and Juan Sebastián Rozo the vice-minister of his area.

In 2019 she directed an investigation area of the Superintendence of Industry and Commerce. Later she was director of fiscal surveillance for the ICT sector in the Comptroller General of the Republic.

Urrutia has been a professor of the master's degree and specialization in ICT Regulation and Management at the Externado University.

== Minister of Information Technologies and Communications ==
She was appointed to lead the Ministry of Information and Communication Technologies (ICT) by President Gustavo Petro. She took office on September 5, 2022, twenty days after the start of the government and after the first scheduled appointment of Mery Gutiérrez could not be performed due to a conflict of interest of the designee.

Urrutia came to form the cabinet as a political representative of the U Party to whom Petro offered the ministry in order to consolidate the party's support in parliament in the so-called "National Agreement" and after studying various curricula that were presented to her.

== Notes ==
Political offices
Preceded by Carmen Ligia Valderrama	Minister of Information Technologies and Communications; 2022–2023	Succeeded by Mauricio Lizcano
Order of precedence
Preceded by Susana Correa as Former Minister of Housing, City and Territory	Order of precedence of Colombia as Former Cabinet Member	Succeeded by Guillermo Reyes as Former Minister of Transport
