= Hollman Morris =

Colombian journalist and politician (born 1969)

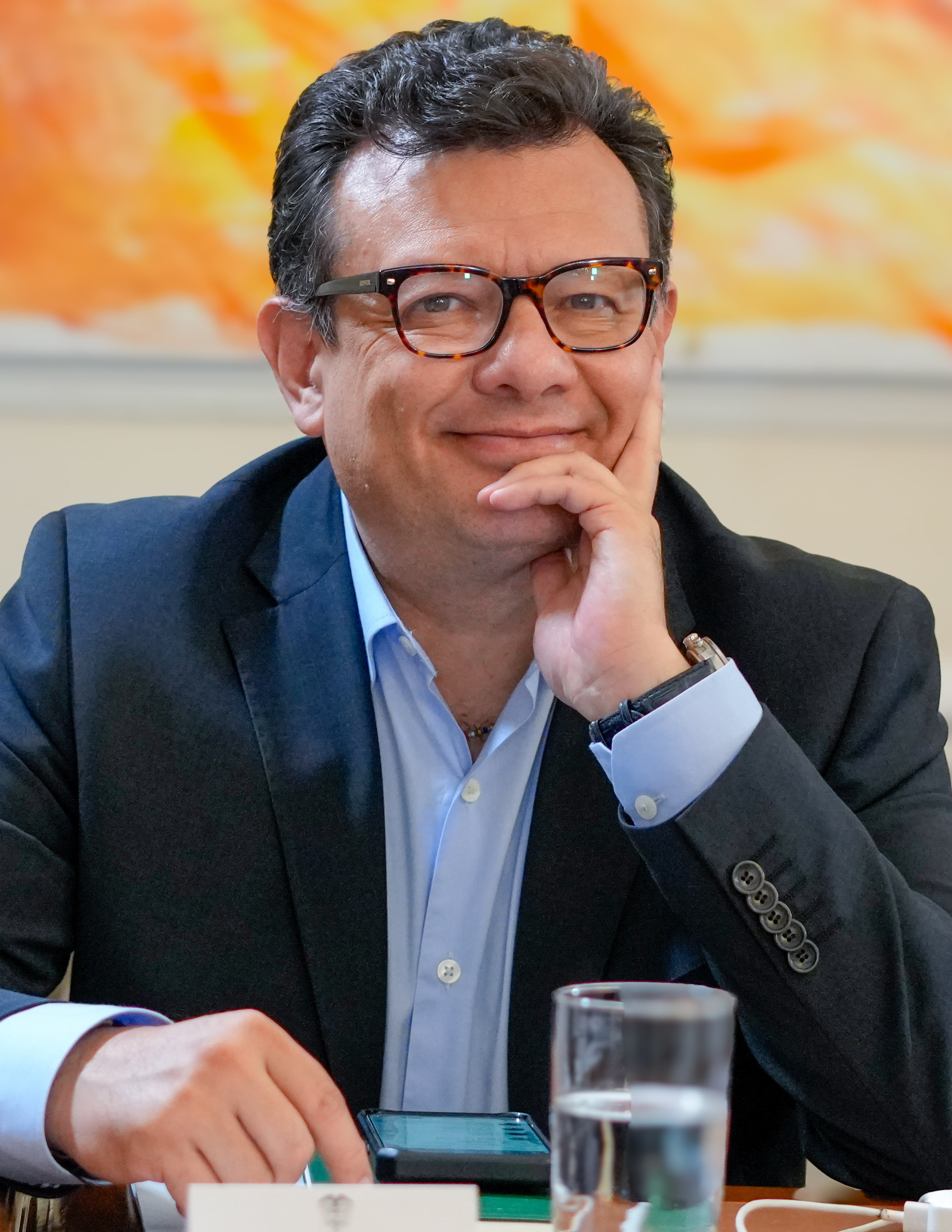
- Morris in 2025

Manager of RTVC Sistema de Medios Públicos
- Incumbent
- Assumed office 5 April 2024
- President: Gustavo Petro
- Preceded by: Nórida Rodríguez

Personal details
- Born: 17 August 1969 (age 56)

Hollman Felipe Morris Rincón (born 17 August 1969) is a Colombian journalist and politician serving as manager of RTVC Sistema de Medios Públicos since 2024. From 2012 to 2014, he served as manager of Canal Capital. From 2016 to 2019, he was a city councillor of Bogotá. In the 2019 municipal elections, he was a candidate for mayor of Bogotá.

In 2011, Morris was awarded the Nuremberg International Human Rights Award.
