= Ministry of Information Technologies and Communications (Colombia) =

Government ministry of Colombia

Ministry for the Information and Communication Technologies
- Ministerio de Tecnologías de la Información y las Comunicaciones

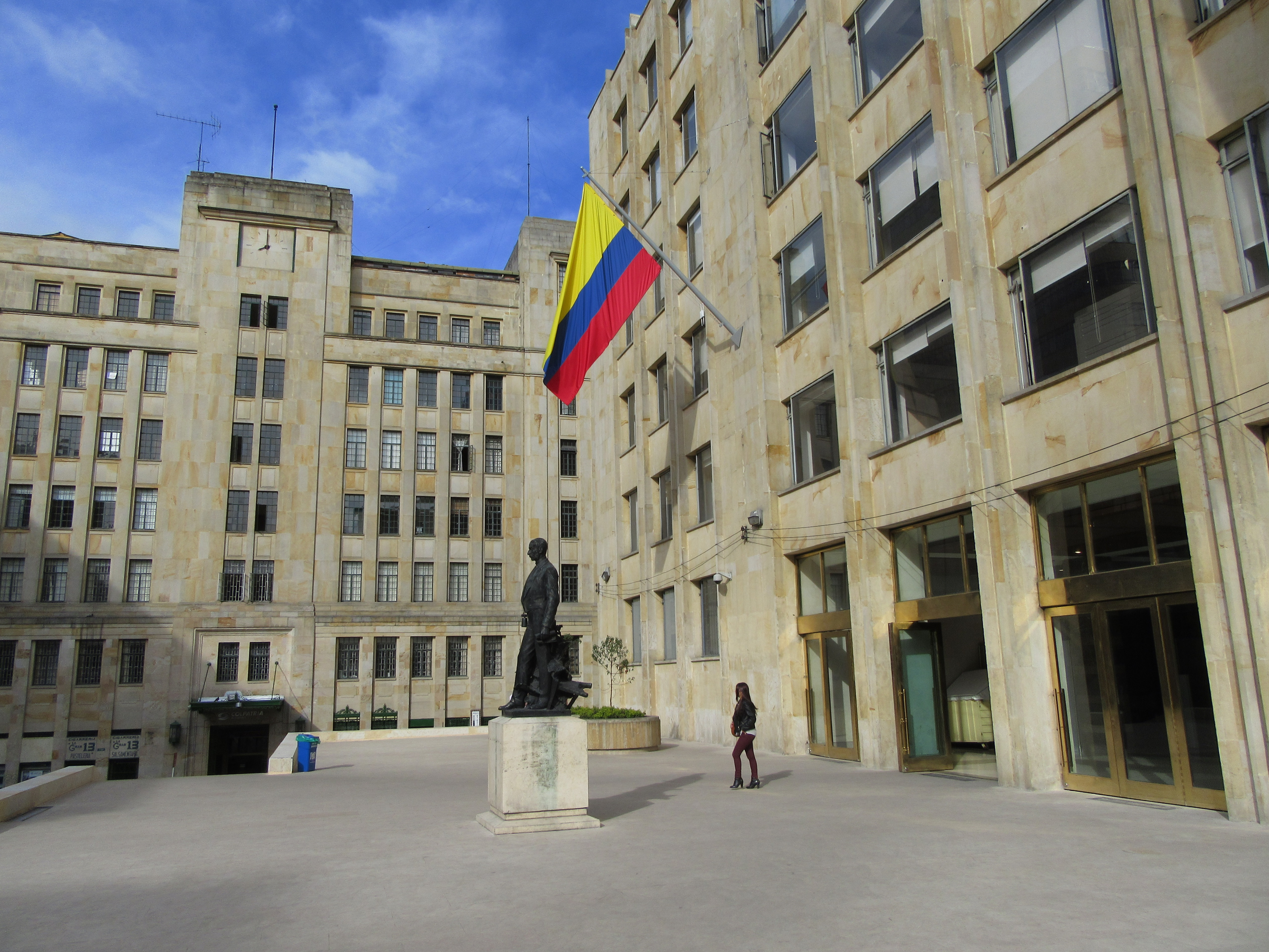
- MinTIC headquarters in Bogotá.

Ministry overview
- Formed: 30 July 2009
- Preceding Ministry: Ministry of Communications
- Headquarters: Edificio Murillo Toro, Carrera 8 Bogotá, D.C., Colombia; 04°36′00.22″N 74°04′29.62″W"
- Annual budget: COP$208,306,200,000 (2012); COP$73,084,400,000 (2013); COP$121,377,300,000 (2014)
- Ministry executive: Minister
- Child agencies: CRC; TIC Fund; 4-72; RTVC
- Website: www.mintic.gov.co

Ministry for the Information and Communications Technologies (Spanish: Ministerio de Tecnologías de la Información y las Comunicaciones, abbreviated MinTIC) is the national executive ministry of the Government of Colombia responsible for overseeing the information and communication technologies, telecommunications and broadcasting industries in Colombia.

== History ==
Former Ministry of Telecommunications, adopted its new name by decree 1341 of 2009.

The current Minister is Mauricio Lizcano, appointed by Colombia's president Gustavo Petro.

== List of ministers of ITC ==
Name	Assumed office	Left office	President(s) served under
Martha Pinto de Hart	7 August 2002	19 July 2006	Álvaro Uribe
María del Rosario Guerra	19 July 2006	31 January 2010	Álvaro Uribe
Daniel Medina (acting)	31 January 2010	7 August 2010	Álvaro Uribe
Diego Molano	7 August 2010	11 May 2015	Juan Manuel Santos
David Luna	15 May 2015	25 April 2018	Juan Manuel Santos
Juan Sebastián Rozo (acting)	26 April 2015	7 August 2018	Juan Manuel Santos
Sylvia Constaín	7 August 2018	4 May 2020	Iván Duque
Karen Abudinen	4 May 2020	9 September 2021	Iván Duque
Iván Mauricio Durán (acting)	10 September 2021	13 October 2021	Iván Duque
Carmen Ligia Valderrama	13 October 2021	7 August 2022	Iván Duque
Sandra Urrutia	5 September 2022	26 April 2023	Gustavo Petro
Mauricio Lizcano	26 April 2023	27 January 2025	Gustavo Petro
Julián Molina	1 March 2025	9 September 2025	Gustavo Petro
Carina Murcia	21 September 2025	7 August 2026	Gustavo Petro
