= Noticias Telemundo (TV program) =

American TV program

- Also known as: Noticiero Telemundo-HBC (1987–1988); Noticiero Telemundo CNN (1988–1996); Telenoticias (1996–1999); Noticiero Telemundo (1999–2016); Noticiero Telemundo Internacional (late-night edition; 2000–2010)
- Genre: News program
- Presented by: Weeknights: Julio Vaqueiro (2021–present); Weekends: Johana Suárez (2022–present) (for past anchors, see section below)
- Country of origin: United States
- Original language: Spanish
- No. of seasons: 28

Production
- Production locations: Telemundo Center, Miami, Florida
- Camera setup: Multi-camera
- Running time: 30 minutes
- Production company: Noticias Telemundo

Original release
- Network: Telemundo
- Release: 1987 – present

Noticias Telemundo (Spanish for 'Telemundo News'; Spanish pronunciation: [noˈti.sjas te.leˈmun.do]) is the flagship daily evening television news program of Noticias Telemundo, the news division of the American Spanish language broadcast television network Telemundo. The nightly early-evening newscast focusing on international news and stories of relevance to the network's main target demographic of Hispanic and Latino Americans. The program is produced out of the news division's facilities in the Miami suburb of Hialeah, Florida.

The program has been anchored at various times by a number of other presenters since its debut in 1986. It also has used various titles under previous production outsourcing arrangements, including Noticiero Telemundo-HBC from 1986 to 1988, Noticiero Telemundo CNN from 1988 to 1996 and CBS Telenoticias from 1996 to 1999. It is the second-most watched Spanish language network newscast in the United States, trailing behind Noticiero Univision in the ratings.

Noticias Telemundo's weekday broadcasts are currently anchored by Julio Vaqueiro who has been the program's main anchor since 2021, when Jose Diaz-Balart moved to MSNBC, and will contribute to all NBC News platforms including Telemundo. The program's late weeknight editions, "Noticias Telemundo: En La Noche" (Spanish for 'Telemundo News: At the Night') is currently anchor by Arantxa Loizaga (appointed from network's morning show Hoy Día in 2022), and before Julio Vaqueiro. It was a first time of late night news edition since May 2020, and it was created for COVID-19 pandemic special edition since March. It's the rival of "Noticiero Univisión: Edición Nocturna". It was change before "Noticias Telemundo: Edición Especial, and Noticias Telemundo con Julio Vaqueiro". The program's weekend editions, Noticias Telemundo: Fin de Semana (Spanish for 'Telemundo News: Weekend'), is currently anchored by Johana Suarez (who joined the program in 2022, came from KUVN-TV Univision 23 Dallas affiliate).

== History ==
Telemundo began airing a nightly newscast in 1987, shortly after the network originally known as NetSpan adopted its current name, when the network debuted Noticiero Telemundo-HBC. The program was produced through an outsourcing agreement with the Miami-based Hispanic-American Broadcasting Corporation, which based the half-hour newscast from a converted warehouse in Miami.

Many of the program's anchors and correspondents previously worked for the Spanish International Network (which became Univision, when the network sold majority ownership to Hallmark Cards that year), before quitting from the Noticias SIN division when staff protested the appointment of former Televisa anchor Jacobo Zabludovsky as director of SIN's news division by network president Emilio Azcárraga Milmo – owner of Univision's minority partner Televisa – due to concerns over the extent of editorial autonomy and potential censorship in its journalistic practices. The newscast was anchored by Lana Montalban, who would later become an evening anchor at Telemundo's New York City owned-and-operated station WNJU for four years after Noticiero Telemundo-HBC's cancellation.

=== Noticiero Telemundo CNN (1988–1996) ===
On March 24, 1988, Telemundo announced that it would end its agreement with Hispanic-American Broadcasting and enter into a news sharing partnership with CNN to produce early and late evening national newscasts, an hour-long weekend news review program, Resumen Semanal Telemundo-CNN, and news briefs that aired five times per day for Telemundo. CNN assumed production responsibilities for the network's newscasts, now titled Noticiero Telemundo CNN ("Telemundo CNN News"), on May 31 of that year, with production of the newscasts becoming based at the cable news channel's headquarters at the CNN Center in Atlanta.

The program was originally co-anchored by Jorge Gestoso and Maria Elvira Salazar. In 1992, Salazar left the program to become a reporter for Noticiero Univision, the news division of rival Univision; she was replaced by Chilean native and former Miss Universe Cecilia Bolocco. In 1996, the program switched to a solo anchor format, with Patricia Janiot as its presenter.

=== CBS Telenoticias (1996–1999) ===
In 1996, following the sale of Telenoticias – a Latin American cable news channel created in 1994 as a joint venture between Telemundo, Argentinean television network Artear, Spain broadcaster Antena 3 and Reuters – to CBS Cable due to low viewership and monetary losses on the venture, Telemundo entered into a content partnership with the channel to take over production of the broadcast network's early-evening and prime time newscasts. In September of that year, the newscasts were rebranded as Telenoticias, with Raul Peimbert anchoring the program. On August 26, 1999, Telenoticias anchor Guillermo Descalzi took over as co-anchor of the program.

=== Noticiero Telemundo (1999–2016) ===
On August 25, 1999, CBS Telenoticias announced that it would not renew production outsourcing agreement with Telemundo upon the expiration of their four-year contract on December 31. The network subsequently announced that it would start an in-house news division of its own and hire staff at its Hialeah, Florida headquarters to produce the evening newscast, with CBS Telenoticias agreeing to allow Telemundo to use its own correspondents in order to allow the network time to hire anchors and correspondents. CBS Telenoticias hire two anchors Ana Patricia Candaini and Guillermo Descalzi (temporarily) while Telemundo was hiring reports were filed by CBS Telenoticias reporters. The network appointed Joe Peyronnin – who previously served as vice president of CBS News and was the founding president of Fox News Channel – to helm its in-house news division as its Executive Vice President of News and Information Programming (a role he would remain in until January 2006).

Always the perennial distant second in the national ratings, the program was relaunched at the Hialeah headquarters on January 1, 2000. At this point, Noticiero Telemundo consisted of two half-hour evening newscasts: a seven-night-a-week general news broadcast focusing on news stories from the United States and around the world, with a focus on issues pertaining to the Latino American community; and a companion weeknight-only late news program produced out of the network's newly created Mexico City bureau, Noticiero Telemundo Internacional, which was produced by Telemundo Internacional (the latter program effectively served as a placeholder show, as it was pre-empted on many of Telemundo's news-producing O&O stations and select affiliates, and was only aired on those that did not operate their own news department, in the event that a station pre-empted their regular local newscasts during major national holidays or the network's national feed in markets where there was no in-market affiliate), an internationally focused news program produced out of its new bureau in Mexico City. Pedro Sevcec joined Noticias Telemundo to co-anchor the new in-house Noticiero Telemundo early evening newscast, joined by Maria Elvira Salazar, Salazar would leave the program in 2002, Ana Patricia Candani replaced Salazar (she had been anchoring Ocurrió Así). Later Candani left the program in 2004 to anchor Noticiero Telemundo Primera Hora (That program served as a placeholder show, as it was pre-empted on many of Telemundo's news-producing O&O stations and select affiliates, and was only aired on those that did not operate their own news department, or the network's national feed in markets where there was no in-market affiliate), with Sevcec anchoring the program solo for the remainder of his tenure as the program's lead anchor. The program established itself early on through various special project reports including "Crónicas de la Frontera" ("Chronicles from the Border"), in which correspondent Gustavo Mariel profiled immigrants risking their lives to cross into the United States–Mexico border to seek a better life, and "Ecstasy Un Viaje al Infierno" ("Ecstasy, A Voyage into Hell"), looking into the dangers of the party drug Rohypnol.

On December 14, 2009, Sevcec announced his departure from Noticiero Telemundo and the network's news division, effective immediately; José Díaz-Balart (who had been serving as a co-host and news anchor for the morning program Cada Dia with María Antonieta ("Every Day with Maria Antonieta") until it was cancelled in May 2008) was named as his replacement and took over as main anchor on December 15; Diaz-Balart would subsequently add a new weekly Sunday morning talk show Enfoque to his duties in February 2010.

Noticiero Telemundo began broadcasting in high definition on August 29, 2011, becoming the second of the three Spanish language network evening news programs to make the transition (almost one month after the network's newsmagazine Al Rojo Vivo made the transition to HD on October 4). Most news video from on-remote locations continued to be shot in standard definition at the time, while Telemundo's news bureaus underwent a conversion to HD, with all bureaus completing the transition in 2012.

The program would return to using a two-anchor format on May 15, 2013, when Noticias Telemundo announced that María Celeste Arrarás would become Diaz-Balart's co-anchor on the program, while remaining anchor of Al Rojo Vivo; the move came after the news division appointed Arrarás to serve as an occasional co-anchor alongside and substituting for Diaz-Balart on the newscast beginning the previous December. Arrarás was co-anchor until 2016.

On July 6, 2015, Noticiero Telemundo became the first national network newscast produce an entire broadcast using mobile devices. Journalists reporting for the special "Digital Day" broadcast were equipped with smartphones and tablet computers to record and transmit stories included on the broadcast, which was also streamed on Noticiero Telemundo's Periscope account, incorporating behind-the-scenes footage of the program's anchors and reporters during breaks within the program.

=== Noticias Telemundo (2016-present) ===
On December 12, 2016, the show was renamed Noticias Telemundo, in line with the news department that produces it.

== Weekend editions ==
Telemundo first offered weekend evening newscasts on September 8, 2001, under the title Noticiero Telemundo: Fin de Semana, with Veteran Colombian journalist and anchorwoman Ilia Calderón – who, with her appointment, became the first black Latina to anchor a Spanish language network newscast in the United States – anchoring the broadcasts.

In January 2007, Noticias Telemundo dropped all weekend news programming from its schedule, discontinuing the Saturday and Sunday editions of Noticiero Telemundo and newsmagazine Al Rojo Vivo, with their respective time periods replaced with broadcasts of Spanish dubbed versions of American feature films (with the move, Univision became the only Spanish-language broadcast network to carry a weekend edition of its evening newscast and the only one carrying any news programming on weekends – outside of sports news shows – altogether). Telemundo would not air a scheduled weekend edition of the newscast until Saturday, December 15, 2012, when it aired a special edition of Noticiero Telemundo – presented by main anchors José Díaz-Balart and María Celeste Arrarás – focusing on the Sandy Hook Elementary School shooting, followed by an hour-long tribute special on singer Jenni Rivera, Jenni Siempre Vivirá, which provided details on the investigation into the plane crash that killed Rivera and eleven others on-board near Monterrey, Mexico, en route from a concert performance on December 9, interviews with Rivera's family, other celebrities and fans.

On May 13, 2014, Telemundo announced that it would restore weekend editions of Noticiero Telemundo after seven years; it later announced on September 4, 2014, that the new Saturday and Sunday editions would premiere on October 4. Edgardo del Villar – who had been serving as news anchor for the network's morning news and lifestyle program Un Nuevo Día, and as a correspondent for Noticiero Telemundo and Al Rojo Vivo – was named anchor of the new weekend broadcasts. In announcing the expansion, then-executive vice president of news and alternative programming Alina Falcón stated that the addition of Noticiero Telemundo Fin de Semana "further confirms our commitment to inform our audience seven days a week, all year long." Noticiero Telemundo: Fin de Semana airs at 6:30 p.m. Eastern and Pacific Time (5:30 p.m. Central and Mountain). In December 2015, del Villar was joined as co-anchor of the Saturday and Sunday editions by Felicidad Aveleyra (who joined the network from Univision owned-and-operated station KMEX-DT in Los Angeles, where she served as anchor of its weeknight 6:00 and 11:00 p.m. newscasts).

On March 17, 2016, Telemundo announced that Luis Carlos Vélez and Felicidad Aveleyra would become weekend co-anchor, effective March 19. The change came after Vélez's announcement that he would step down from his post as the network's Executive Vice President of News to become a news anchor and correspondent for Noticias Telemundo. del Villar, who was removed as weekend anchor as a result, was not assigned to a new position with the network.

The weekend editions may occasionally be preempted due to Telemundo Deportes soccer and hockey telecasts that are scheduled to air within the program's normal time slot.

On Saturday November 19, the Saturday editions of Noticiero Telemundo were moved to 6:30 p.m. timeslot to compete against Univision's Saturday evening newscast (some local Telemundo affiliates moved their weekend 5:30 p.m. newscast to 6 p.m. to accompany the new network newscasts timeslot).

== On-air staff ==
=== Current anchors ===
- Julio Vaqueiro – Noticias Telemundo 6:30pm anchor (2021–present)
- Nicole Suárez - Noticias Telemundo Edición Mediodia co-anchor (2023–present)
- Octavio Pulido - Noticias Telemundo Edición Mediodía co-anchor (2023–present)
- Arantxa Loziaga - Noticias Telemundo En la Noche Anchor (2022–present)
- Johana Suárez - Noticias Telemundo Fin De Semana Anchor (2022–present)

=== Former anchors ===
- Lana Montalban (1987–1988)
- Jorge Gestoso (1988–1996)
- Maria Elvira Salazar (1988–1992, 2000–2002)
- Cecilia Bolocco (1992–1994)
- Patricia Janiot (1994–1996)
- Raul Peimbert (1996–1999)
- Guillermo Descalzi (1999)
- Pedro Sevcec (2000–2009)
- Ana Patricia Candiani (2002-2004)
- Edgardo del Villar – weekend anchor (2014–2016)
- María Celeste Arrarás – weeknight co-anchor (2012–2016)
- Sheyene Gerardi - Anchor (2017)
- Luis Carlos Vélez - weekend co-anchor (2016–2017)
- José Díaz-Balart - Anchor (2008-2021)
