= Noticias Telemundo =

News division of Telemundo

- Division of: Telemundo
- Key people: Luis Fernandez (Executive Vice President of News, Noticias Telemundo); Humberto Duran (Vice President of News, Noticias Telemundo); Joe Uva (COO, NBCUniversal Hispanic Enterprises and Content); Luis Silberwasser (President, Telemundo Network)
- Founded: 1999 (own division)
- Headquarters: Telemundo Center; 2350 NW 117th Place, Miami, Florida, U.S.
- Major bureaus: International Headquarters, 2350 NW 117th Place, Miami, Florida; Mexico Headquarters, Mexico City, Mexico; Puerto Rico Headquarters; San Juan, Puerto Rico
- Area served: United States; Puerto Rico
- Broadcast programs: Al Rojo Vivo con María Celeste; Enfoque; Hoy Día; Noticias Telemundo; Noticias Telemundo: Fin de Semana
- Owner: NBCUniversal News Group
- Website: www.telemundo.com/noticias/noticias-telemundo

Noticias Telemundo (Spanish for Telemundo News); Spanish pronunciation: [noˈtisjas teleˈmundo]) is Telemundo's news division. The division is owned by the NBCUniversal News Group, which is part of NBCUniversal, a division of Comcast. Noticias Telemundo is based out of the network's facilities in the Miami suburb of Hialeah, Florida.

The division produces a flagship nightly early-evening newscast of the same name, focusing on international news and stories of relevance to the network's main target demographic of Hispanic and Latino Americans. Other programs produced by the news division include morning news-talk show Hoy Día, newsmagazine series Al Rojo Vivo con María Celeste, and Sunday morning political affairs program Enfoque con Jose Diaz-Balart.

Noticias Telemundo maintains bureaus located at many of the network's television stations across the United States (particularly those owned by parent subsidiary Telemundo Station Group, that are owned-and-operated stations of the network) and throughout Latin America, and uses video content from English language sister network NBC's news division NBC News.

== Background ==
The history of Noticias Telemundo traces back to 1987, when the network debuted its first news program Noticiero Telemundo-HBC, a program produced through an outsourcing agreement with the Miami-based Hispanic-American Broadcasting Corporation that was anchored by Lana Montalban; following the program's cancellation, Montalban accepted an anchor position at the network's New York City owned-and-operated station WNJU, where she served as an anchor of its evening newscasts until 1992.

The following year, on March 24, 1988, Telemundo entered into a partnership with cable news channel CNN to produce two daily newscasts, titled Noticiero Telemundo CNN ("Telemundo CNN News"); CNN took over production of the network's newscasts on May 31 of that year. In addition, CNN also produced an hour-long weekend news review program, Resumen Semanal Telemundo-CNN, and news briefs that aired five times per day for Telemundo. Produced at the CNN Center in Atlanta, the program was anchored by Jorge Gestoso and Maria Elvira Salazar. Salazar later left the program to become a reporter at rival Univision's news division Noticiero Univision; Chilean native Cecilia Bolocco, a former Miss Universe, was named as Salazar's replacement. The final incarnation produced in Atlanta was co-anchored by Patricia Janiot. In 1992, Enrique Gratas joined the network to serve as anchor of Ocurrió Así, a nightly newsmagazine providing in-depth stories dealing with issues pertinent to U.S. Hispanics and investigative reports.

In 1994, Telemundo launched its own 24-hour cable news channel, Telenoticias, which was operated as a joint venture between Argentinean television network Artear, Spain broadcaster Antena 3 and Reuters. The venture was not successful and the partners later sold the channel to CBS Cable in 1996, which rebranded the network as CBS Telenoticias and increased its distribution across North, Central and South America. Following the sale of Telenoticias to CBS, Telemundo entered into a content partnership with the channel to produce early-evening and prime time newscasts that would air on the broadcast network. CBS sold Telenoticias back to Telemundo in February 2000, after which the network was relaunched as the entertainment-based Telemundo Internacional.

Noticias Telemundo was founded as an in-house network news division on August 25, 1999, under the auspices of former CBS News vice president Joe Peyronnin, who served as the Telemundo division's executive vice president until 2006. After Telemundo's agreement with CBS Telenoticias ended the day prior, the network launched two half-hour evening newscasts on January 1, 2000, the nightly general news broadcast Noticiero Telemundo, which was produced out of Telemundo's Hialeah, Florida headquarters; and the weeknight-only late news program Noticiero Telemundo Internacional (the latter program was pre-empted on many of Telemundo's news-producing O&O stations and select affiliates, only airing on affiliates that did not operate their own news department, in the event that a station pre-empted their regular local newscasts during major national holidays or the network's national feed in markets where there was no in-market affiliate), an internationally focused news program produced out of its new bureau in Mexico City.

In September 2000, the network launched a three-hour morning news program, Esta Mañana, the network's first national morning show entry, hosted by Jose Diaz-Balart (who joined the network from CBS, where he anchored CBS This Morning prior to its cancellation) and former Univision anchor Gloria Calzada. Additional news programs were created by the network in the wake of the September 11, 2001 attacks: Esta Manana was replaced by Hoy en el Mundo ("Today in the World") a program that ran from 7 a.m. to 9 a.m. on Telemundo, an news program focused on national and international stories anchored by Diaz-Balart and Marian de la Fuente; it also launched a companion early morning newscast at 6:00 a.m. for stations that didn't have a local morning newscast called Noticiero Telemundo Primera Hora ("First Hour"). Further more the launched a variety morning show that had a similar format to Esta Manaña called "De Mañanita" that aired from 9 a.m. to 10 a.m. Also in wake of the September 11, 2001 attacks Telemundo launched another news program that aired weeknights called "Un Nuevo Mundo, Una Nacion Unida" that aired at 7 P.M. that program was anchored by Pedro Sevcec and Ocurrió Así anchor Ana Patricia Candiani, the show replaced a weeknight novela called "Provacame" that show was rescheduled . In 2002, the network launched a late afternoon news and entertainment magazine series, similar in format to its Univision competitor Primer Impacto, Al Rojo Vivo con Maria Celeste.

In 2005, Telemundo signed longtime Univision anchor María Antonieta Collins to a long-term contract, in which she would host a program for the network. The network then cancelled Hoy en el Mundo on Telemundo and Primera Hora, replacing them on October 10, 2005, with a news and lifestyle program titled Cada Dia with Maria Antonieta ("Every Day with Maria Antonieta"); Collins hosted the program, with Diaz-Balart serving as co-host and also serving as anchor of another early morning news program titled Noticiero Telemundo: Primera Hora ("Telemundo Newscast: First Hour"), before leaving that program and being replaced as anchor by Ana Patricia Candiani.

In 2007, Telemundo discontinued the Saturday and Sunday editions of the flagship Noticiero Telemundo broadcast and Al Rojo Vivo, which were replaced with feature films and reality-based series (with the move, Univision became the only Spanish-language broadcast network to carry a weekend edition of its evening newscast and the only one carrying any non-sports news programming on weekends altogether); weekend editions of Noticiero Telemundo were restored on October 4, 2014, focusing on general news, health and consumer segments, analysis of the previous week's major stories and a preview of events occurring in the coming week (which was scheduled 90 minutes earlier than the flagship weeknight editions, at 5:00 p.m. Eastern and Pacific Time, to accommodate the network's prime time entertainment programming).

Cada Dia was cancelled in May 2008, after Collins announced that she would leave Telemundo when her contract expired in August of that year return to news anchoring and as a result of low ratings for the program; Noticiero Telemundo: Madrugada, meanwhile, was replaced by an hour-long music and dance program that was spun off from the network's Saturday afternoon series Descontrol. The former of the two morning news shows was replaced by a new hybrid news and lifestyle program (similar in format to Univision's ¡Despierta América!), ¡Levántate! ("Get Up"), which was initially broadcast and produced by out of the studios of the network's San Juan, Puerto Rico station WKAQ-TV. The hybrid program, which was retitled Un Nuevo Día ("A New Day") in July 2012, originally included local participation of the network's Miami owned-and-operated station WSCV from its studios in the suburb of Miramar, Florida, and bureaus located in New York City, Los Angeles and Mexico City. The show was later revamped in February 2011, discontinuing the local cut-ins and relocating its production operations to Telemundo's headquarters in Hialeah.

In 2011, Telemundo debuted a half-hour Sunday morning political and cultural affairs talk show Enfoque, hosted by Diaz-Balart, marking a restoration of weekend news programming on the network (outside of its weekend evening sports highlight program Titulares Telemundo); the program was expanded to one hour in January 2014.

On July 6, 2015, Noticiero Telemundo became the first national network newscast to produce an entire broadcast using mobile devices. Journalists reporting for the special "Digital Day" broadcast were equipped with smartphones and tablet computers to record and transmit stories included on the broadcast, which was also streamed on Noticiero Telemundo's Periscope account, incorporating behind-the-scenes footage of the program's anchors and reporters during breaks within the program.

== Programs ==
=== Current ===
- Al Rojo Vivo – newsmagazine (2002–present)
- Hoy Día – weekday morning news and lifestyle program (2021–present)
- Noticias Telemundo – flagship evening newscast (1996–present) (originally titled Noticiero Telemundo until 2016)
- Noticias Telemundo Fin De Semana – flagship weekend evening newscast (2001–2007 and 2014–present)
- Noticias Telemundo Mediodia - weekday afternoon newscast (2018–present)
- Noticias Telemundo: Coronavirus 'Un País En Alerta - (temporary name for new show due to the COVID-19 pandemic) to be named
- Noticias Telemundo en la Noche - weeknight late newscast (2020–present)
- Noticias Telemundo Ahora – weekday morning newscast (2025–present)

=== Former ===
- Cada Dia with María Antonieta (2005–2008)
- Está Mañana (2000-2002)
- Hoy en el Mundo (2002–2005)
- De Mañanita (2002-2005)
- Noticiero Telemundo CNN (1988–1996)
- Noticiero Telemundo Internacional (1999–2011)
- Noticiero Telemundo: Madrugada (2005–2008)
- Ocurrió Así (1992–1999)
- Telemundo HBC (1987–1988)
- Un Nuevo Día (2008–2021)

== On-air staff ==
=== Current on-air staff ===
- Jose Diaz-Balart – anchor of Breaking News & Specials at Noticias Telemundo, host of Enfoque
- Julio Vaqueiro – anchor of Noticias Telemundo
- Nacho Lozano – co-anchor of Noticias Telemundo Mediodia
- Arantxa Loziaga - anchor of the late-night editions of "Noticias Telemundo En La Noche"
- Johana Suarez - anchor of the weekend editions of "Noticias Telemundo Fin De Semana"
- Nicole Suarez - Anchor of "Hoy Día"

=== Notable former on-air staff ===
† Indicates deceased

- Enrique Gratas (later at Estrella TV)†
- Pedro Sevcec (now at WJAN-CD)
- Edgardo Del Villar (later at Telemundo O&O WNJU-TV)†
- Paulina Sodí (now at Univision's Streaming app Vix "La Voz De La Mañana) (2017-2021)
- Felicidad Avelyera (2015-2022)
- Ada Monzón, first female Puerto Rican meteorologist
