= Joe Peyronnin =

Television news executive

- Born: August 3, 1947 (age 79); Chicago, Illinois, U.S.
- Education: Columbia College Chicago; Roosevelt University
- Occupations: News executive and producer, journalism professor
- Employer: New York University
- Title: NYU Journalism Professor (2008–present) Hosftra Journalism Professor (2011–2019) Executive Vice President and founder of Telemundo News (1998–2005); President of Fox News (1995–1996); Senior Executive and Producer at CBS News (1970–1995)CBS News (1970–1995)
- Spouse: Susan Zirinsky (m. 1984)
- Awards: October 2022 – The Dean's Award issued by the Walter Heller School of Business of Roosevelt University, associated with outstanding alumni (MBA 1978) 2016–2017 – Teacher of the Year, Hofstra's School of Communication; 2002 – Recognized by the National Academy of Television Arts & Sciences for Telemundo's news coverage of the 9/11 Terrorist Attack; 1994 – Who's Who in America, 43rd edition 1975 - Breaking News Emmy Award WBBM-TV Chicago coverage train accident

Joseph Felix Peyronnin III (born August 3, 1947) was the executive vice president and founder of Telemundo News (1998–2006), the former President of Fox News, and a former senior executive and producer at CBS News (1970–1995). He is currently an adjunct journalism professor at New York University, and has served as an associate professor of journalism at Hofstra University (2011–2019). Peyronnin is a long time Trustee of Vibrant Emotional Health, overseers of the 988 Suicide & Crisis Lifeline, and a Trustee of Gracie Square Hospital in New York City. He has also been a member of the Council on Foreign Relations since 1994.

== Personal life ==
Joe Peyronnin was born in Chicago, Illinois, the son of Joseph F. Peyronnin, a senior executive in construction and contracting, and a World War II veteran, and Dorothy Hargreaves Peyronnin. The family settled in Deerfield, Illinois, in 1955. He graduated from Deerfield High School, has a Bachelor of Arts in Radio Broadcasting from Columbia College Chicago (1970), and a Masters of Business Administration from Roosevelt University's Walter Heller School of Business (1978). Peyronnin has been married to Susan Zirinsky, the former President of CBS News and currently President of See It Now Studios at Paramount Global, since 1984. They have one child, Zoe Peyronnin.

== CBS ==
Peyronnin began working at WEXI FM (now WCPY), a small Chicago area FM radio station, as a news announcer in the late 60's. He was hired out of college by WBBM-TV CBS Chicago as a desk assistant in their newsroom. He worked his way up to broadcast producer, and won a local Emmy Award. In 1976 CBS News promoted him to their Chicago bureau where he served as a producer covering stories in the Midwestern U.S.

In 1979 CBS News promoted Peyronnin to their Washington bureau where he worked as an associate producer for the CBS Evening News with Walter Cronkite. In that role he covered the Carter and Reagan White House, Congress, several presidential elections, and international stories, including the 1982 Lebanon War where he was stationed in Beirut. He was promoted to Senior Producer of the CBS Evening News in Washington, 1984. In 1987 he was promoted to CBS News Vice President and Washington Bureau Chief.

Peyronnin was named vice president and assistant to the president of CBS News in December 1988 based in New York. In that role he was the division's number two executive and oversaw all news programming and global newsgathering.

== Fox News ==
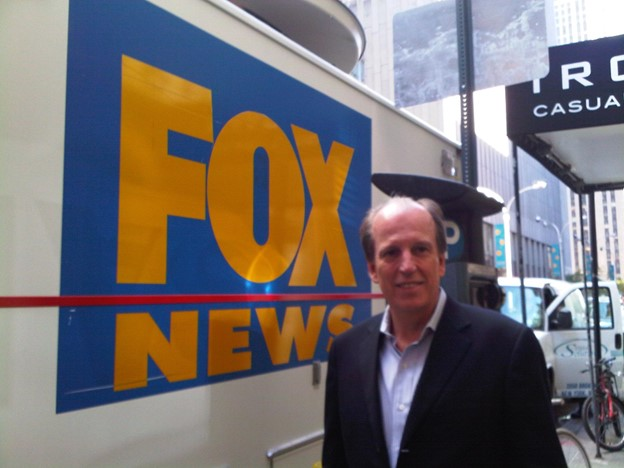
Peyronnin standing next to the first satellite truck owned by FOX News in 1995

Peyronnin was named president of Fox News (1995–1996) by NewsCorp CEO Rupert Murdoch in March 1995. Peyronnin put together an affiliate news service, produced news specials and developed plans for Fox News Sunday with Tony Snow. In early 1996 Murdoch hired Roger Ailes as chairman and CEO of Fox News and Cable. Ailes asked Peyronnin to stay on as president, and he described his plan to create an "alternative news channel." Ailes complained in particular about CBS News, at one point describing it as the "Communist Broadcasting System". Peyronnin resigned his position explaining to Ailes he would not do alternative journalism. He left Ailes with a core staff of producers and reporters. Al Franken wrote a brief synopsis of this period in his book Lies and the Lying Liars Who Tell Them.

== Telemundo ==
In November 1997 Sony bought a stake in the US-based Spanish-language broadcaster Telemundo. Peyronnin was hired in 1998 as a consultant to develop a plan for network and local news. In 1999, he was hired as Executive Vice President of News and Information Programming at Telemundo network. He founded the Telemundo network owned news organization in 1999. He oversaw the network's national newscast, Noticiero Telemundo; the development of morning news programming Esta Manana; the network's first weekend newscast, Fin De Semana; its first news magazines, Sin Fronteras and A Rojo Vivo; and its first Sunday public affairs program, Enfoque. He oversaw Telemundo's award-winning news coverage of the 9/11 terrorist attacks, for which Telemundo provided 133 hours of continuous live coverage, more than any other network.

NBC purchased Telemundo in 2001. Peyronnin was part of the management team that integrated Telemundo into the NBC organization. For the first time bi-lingual Telemundo reporters appeared on NBC News. Telemundo contributed to NBC News’ award-winning coverage of the American led coalition's invasion of Iraq in 2003. Peyronnin, who commuted weekly to Telemundo's Miami based offices from his home in New York City, stepped down at the end of 2005.

== Later career ==
Peyronnin became an investor and adviser to digital media companies (exa: VFinity). He continues to advocate for objective news coverage. As a contributor to the Huffington Post he wrote nearly 400 blog posts, an opinion piece for the New York Times, as a panelist on The Strategy Room on Fox News' streaming channel, and appearing on NPR. In 2008 NYU hired Peyronnin as an adjunct journalism professor. Hofstra University hired him in 2011 as a full-time associate journalism professor. In 2017 he was named "Teacher of the Year" at Hofstra's Lawrence Herbert School of Communication. Peyronnin continues to teach at NYU. In 2020, Peyronnin was asked to contribute the final book chapter, "The Truth Under Attack", for Fake News: Real Issues in Mass Communication and Journalism an anthological survey of technological, ethical, and legal issues raised by misinformation.

== Awards ==
- October 2022 – The Dean's Award issued by the Walter Heller School of Business of Roosevelt University, associated with outstanding alumni (MBA 1978)
- 2016–2017 – Teacher of the Year, Hofstra's School of Communication
- 2002 – Recognized by the National Academy of Television Arts & Sciences for Telemundo's news coverage of the 9/11 Terrorist Attack
- 1994 – Who's Who in America, 43rd edition
- 1975 – Breaking News Emmy Award WBBM-TV Chicago coverage train accident
