= CBS Telenoticias =

Defunct Latin American news channel

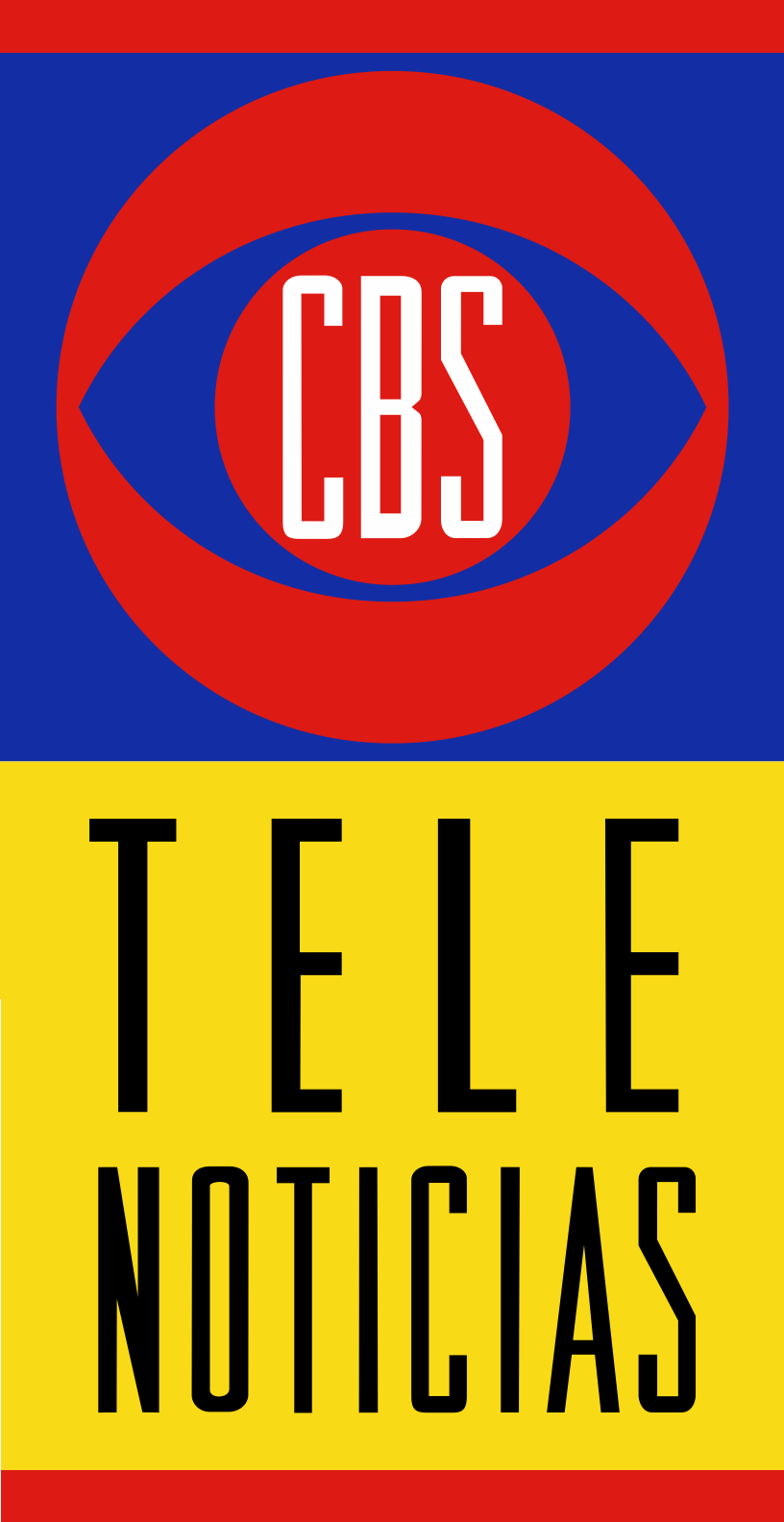
- Logo for CBS Telenoticias
- Broadcast area: Latin America
- Headquarters: Miami, Florida, U.S.

Programming
- Languages: Spanish; Portuguese
- Picture format: 480i (SDTV)

Ownership
- Owner: Telemundo (1994–1997; 2000); CBS (1997-1998 full ownership; 1998-1999 part ownership); Grupo Medcom (1998-2000 part ownership)
- Parent: Telemundo Group (1994–1997); CBS Corporation (1997-1998 full ownership; 1998-1999 part ownership); Viacom (1999-2000 part ownership); Sony Pictures Entertainment and Liberty Media (2000)

History
- Launched: 1 December 1994; 31 years ago
- Closed: 1 March 2000; 26 years ago
- Replaced by: Telemundo Internacional
- Former names: Telenoticias (1994–1997)

CBS Telenoticias (written as CBS Telenotícias in Brazil, formerly known simply as Telenoticias) was a subscription news television channel operated by CBS, headquartered in Miami. It was the first news channel to broadcast its programming in Spanish and Portuguese languages to Latin America.

== History ==
=== Early years: 1994-96 ===
Telemundo Group (then owned by investment firm Reliance Capital) announced that it would launch a 24-hour Spanish-language cable news channel that would be distributed in Latin America, Spain and the United States; at the time of the announcement, Telemundo was in the midst of negotiations with Reuters and the British Broadcasting Corporation (BBC) to become partners in the planned network, which it initially scheduled a target launch for later that year. Telemundo planned to use resources from Reuters Television and BBC World Service Television to provide content for international news stories, with BBC contributing its BBC Latin America Service's international newscasts and analysis programs.

While the BBC ultimately did not partner in the network, Reuters (which acquired a 42% interest) would reach an agreement to develop the network with Telemundo (which also maintained a 42% stake). Three other media companies acquired interests in the new venture, Argentine publishing and broadcasting owner Grupo Clarín (which owned 8%) and Spain-based Antena 3 (which owned the remaining 8%).

On January 25, 1994, the partners announced that the service would be named Telenoticias. The network launched on December 1, 1994, becoming the third 24-hour news channel to serve Latin America that was headquartered in the region (Mexican giant Televisa's ECO was the first, launched in 1988; Canal de Noticias NBC, a venture launched by eventual Telemundo parent NBC on March 15, 1993, was the second, as it operated from the Charlotte, North Carolina facilities of the NBC News Channel affiliate video service). Telenoticias – which broadcast its programming in Spanish and Portuguese – was operated out of Telemundo's headquarters in the Miami suburb of Hialeah, Florida. In addition to distribution on cable and satellite television, some Telenoticias programming was also carried by television stations in certain U.S. markets, including KUBD (now Ion Television owned-and-operated station KPXC-TV) in Denver; WSNS-TV in Chicago (which otherwise operated as a Telemundo owned-and-operated station); and KQBN-LP (now Azteca affiliate KUDF-LP) in Tucson, Arizona. Anchors employed by the channel during this time included Marian de la Fuente, Jose Gray, Carlos Maria Ruiz, Rodrigo Vera, Pablo Gato and Susana Roza Vigil.

=== CBS ownership (1996–1998) ===
From the beginning, all five of the network's owners did not maintain a smooth relationship, disagreeing on Telenoticias' management and content; ultimately, the partners opted to sell of the network. In late June 1996, the companies sold Telenoticias to CBS through its parent CBS Corporation (the company eventually merged into Viacom in 1999), marking the company's first cable television venture since it ran the short-lived arts-oriented network CBS Cable (which it eventually named its new cable division) in the early 1980s. By this point, Telenoticias was available to 20 million households in 22 countries.

Following the closure of the CBS purchase, the network was rebranded CBS Telenoticias on January 1, 1997. As part of the sale agreement, Telemundo entered into an agreement to outsource production responsibilities for the Telemundo network's national news program, Noticiero Telemundo, whose main anchor Raul Peimbert subsequently joined Telenoticias; the deal allowed CBS Telenoticias to produce the two weeknight-only newscasts, which aired at 6:30 and 10:30 p.m. Eastern Time (the latter having been moved into prime time as part of a programming realignment that removed an hour of telenovelas from the network's evening schedule to accommodate the move of local newscasts on Telemundo stations into the 10:00 p.m. hour), replacing an existing production agreement with CNN. The network also began utilizing resources from CBS Newspath to provide story content to supplement the newscasts, and based a small unit of reporters at the affiliate news service's headquarters in Washington, D.C. The network expanded its distribution into the United States in the fall of 1997, with the launch of a service that emphasized news content focusing on the United States, the Caribbean and Mexico that launched on the same date as CNN en Español; the U.S. service featured two issues-focused talk shows, along with rolling newscasts.

In late 1997, CBS Telenoticias began providing news programming content to Radio Unica, a radio network that launched in December of that year as the first nationally distributed Spanish-language radio network in the United States.

=== Launch in Brazil ===
The Portuguese language version debuted in October 1997 on the DirecTV Brasil line-up. Initially, it had about 12 hours of programming in Portuguese; the rest of the broadcast day was covered by CBS news programs. With the creation of the Portuguese language version of the channel, the cable operators NET and Multicanal, at the time owned by Grupo Globo, decided to remove the channel from their programming to avoid competition with GloboNews. In addition, the channel's launch was delayed several months as the satellite that was to transmit CBS Telenotícias, PanAmSat 5 – which went into orbit in August 1997 – did not become fully operational until October 12, and cable providers obtained satellite receivers to receive the signal beamed from PanAmSat 5 later than expected.

CBS Telenotícias scored an early coup. Beginning on December 15, 1997, it took over production of Jornal do SBT, the main newscast of SBT. The Brazilian network and CBS, also began sharing content. Eliakim Araújo and Leila Cordeiro hosted the news program from Miami, while Hermano Henning hosted the program from the SBT studios, located in Osasco, in the Greater São Paulo. This deal was similar to the Noticiero Telemundo production agreement.

TVA (currently Vivo TV) began including the channel in their line-up from February 1, 1998, in their basic package.

In March 1998, SBT started to broadcast five hours of programming from CBS Telenotícias through the night, known as SINAL (Sistema de Notícias da América Latina; Latin American News System in English). Telenotícias also established content sharing partnerships with Band and TV Cultura, but their contributions could not be shown on SBT.

=== Bankruptcy, and sales to Grupo Medcom and Telemundo (1998–2000) ===
During the first quarter of 1998 alone, Telenoticias and fellow CBS Cable-owned channel Eye on People lost a combined $9 million in revenue. In late 1998, CBS sold a 70% interest in the channel to Mexican-based Grupo Medcom, a concern operated by the Serna family; under the deal, CBS continued to provide news content resources through CBS Newspath (CBS also sold its stake in Eye on People to Discovery Communications, which subsequently rebranded the network as Discovery People). Financial problems ultimately trickled into Telenoticias' operations; as a result, CBS Telenoticias stopped producing Jornal do SBT in early 1999 (with SBT continuing to produce the program in-house until it ended in 2016). However, in July 1999, the network's financial problems got even worse; some of the telephones at one of the network's news bureaus were disconnected, employees received salary paychecks later than scheduled, and reimbursements were never paid out. By the end of that month, CBS Telenoticias laid off 77 staffers; several days later, the network filed for Chapter 11 bankruptcy. Despite the filing, the network gained affiliations with a few low-power television stations, such as K19BW (now KLEG-CD) in Dallas.

CBS sold its stake in Telenoticias to Sony Pictures Entertainment and Liberty Media in February 2000 for $2.35 million; the deal was approved in federal bankruptcy court, placing Telenoticias back under the auspices of Telemundo, which Sony and Liberty acquired months after Telenoticias' sale to CBS. The channel ultimately ceased operations on March 1, 2000. The Portuguese language division was dissolved as part of an agreement between Telemundo and Rede Globo to broadcast its telenovelas, and the Spanish-language channel would be replaced by the international version of Telemundo.
