= Bowling for Columbine =

2002 documentary film by Michael Moore

- Theatrical release poster
- Directed by: Michael Moore
- Written by: Michael Moore
- Based on: Causes of the Columbine High School massacre in 1999
- Produced by: Michael Moore; Kathleen Glynn; Jim Czarnecki; Charles Bishop; Michael Donovan; Kurt Engfehr
- Starring: Michael Moore
- Narrated by: Michael Moore
- Edited by: Kurt Engfehr
- Music by: Jeff Gibbs
- Production companies: Alliance Atlantis; Salter Street Films; Dog Eat Dog Films
- Distributed by: United Artists (United States; through MGM Distribution Co.); Prokino Filmverleih (Germany); Alliance Atlantis (International)
- Release dates: May 16, 2002 (Cannes); October 11, 2002 (United States); October 18, 2002 (Canada)
- Running time: 120 minutes
- Countries: United States; Canada; Germany
- Language: English
- Budget: $4 million
- Box office: $58 million

Bowling for Columbine is a 2002 documentary film written, produced, directed, and narrated by Michael Moore. The documentary film explores what Moore suggests are the primary causes for the Columbine High School massacre in 1999 and other acts of gun violence. He focuses on the background and environment in which the massacre took place and some common public opinions and assumptions about related issues. The film also looks into the nature of violence in the United States, and American violence abroad.

A critical and commercial success, the film brought Moore international attention as a rising filmmaker and won numerous awards, including the Academy Award for Best Documentary Feature, the Independent Spirit Award for Best Documentary Feature, a special 55th Anniversary Prize at the 2002 Cannes Film Festival, and the César Award for Best Foreign Film. The film is widely considered one of the greatest documentary films of all time.

== Summary ==
In Moore's discussions with various people—including South Park co-creator Matt Stone, the National Rifle Association's president Charlton Heston, Oklahoma City bombing suspect James Nichols, and musician Marilyn Manson—he seeks to explain why the Columbine massacre occurred and why the United States' violent crime rate (especially concerning crimes committed with firearms) is substantially higher than those of other nations.

== Film content ==
=== Bowling ===
The film's title refers to the story that Eric Harris and Dylan Klebold—the two students responsible for the Columbine High School massacre—attended a school bowling class at 6:00 AM on the day they committed the attacks at school, that commenced at 11:17 AM. Later investigations showed that this was based on mistaken recollections, and Glenn Moore of the Golden Police Department concluded that they were absent from school on the day the attack took place.

Moore also incorporates the concept of recreational bowling into the film in other ways. For example, the Michigan Militia use bowling pins for their target practice. When interviewing former classmates of the two boys, Moore notes that the students took a bowling class instead of physical education. He suggests that this might have very little educational value and the people he interviews generally agree, noting how Harris and Klebold led introverted lifestyles and had careless attitudes towards the game, and that nobody thought twice about it. Moore questions whether the school system is responding to the real needs of students or if they are reinforcing fear. Moore also interviews two young residents of Oscoda, Michigan. Moore suggests a culture of fear created by the government and the media leads Americans to arm themselves, to the advantage of gun-making companies. Moore suggests that bowling could have been just as responsible for the attacks on the school as Marilyn Manson, or even President Bill Clinton, who launched bombing attacks on Serbia at the time.

=== Free gun for opening a bank account ===
Michael Moore upon receiving his free rifle at the bank.

An early scene depicts a bank in northern Michigan that gives customers a free hunting rifle when they make a deposit of a certain size into a time deposit account. The film follows Moore as he goes to the bank, makes his deposit, fills out the forms, and awaits the result of a background check before walking out of the bank carrying a brand new Weatherby hunting rifle. Just before leaving the bank, Moore asks: "Do you think it's a little dangerous handing out guns at a bank?"

The Boston Review called this scene a fabrication that did not depict standard procedures for the bank:

[T]he bank doesn't ordinarily hand over guns to customers. Moore's people arranged this exchange well in advance. The required paperwork and waiting time for gun ownership was done long before the scene was shot and as a favor to Moore the rifle had been delivered to the bank so Moore could pick it up there rather than going to the gun dealer as is ordinarily required. One Michigan bank does indeed reward a savings account with a gift certificate for a rifle...But nothing else in this scene, according to the bank official, has anything to do with reality.

Similarly, The Wall Street Journal called the scene "staged".

=== "Happiness Is a Warm Gun" montage ===
About 20 minutes into the film, the Beatles song "Happiness Is a Warm Gun" plays during a montage in which footage of the following is shown:

- People buying guns
- Residents of Virgin, Utah, a town that passed a law requiring all residents to own guns
- People firing rifles at carnivals and shooting ranges
- Denise Ames operating a rifle
- Carey McWilliams, a blind gun enthusiast from Fargo, North Dakota
- Gary Plauché killing Jeff Doucet, who had kidnapped and sexually abused Plauché's son
- The televised suicide of Pennsylvania treasurer R. Budd Dwyer
- A 1993 murder where Emilio Nuñez shot and killed his ex-wife Maritza Martin during an interview on the Telemundo program Ocurrió Así
- The suicide of Daniel V. Jones, an AIDS and cancer patient who was protesting health maintenance organizations
- A man who takes his shirt off and is shot during a riot

=== Weapons of mass destruction ===
Early in the film, Moore links the violent behavior of the Columbine shooters to the presence of a large defense establishment manufacturing rocket technology in Littleton. It is implied that the presence of this facility within the community, and the acceptance of institutionalized violence as a solution to conflict, contributed to the mindset that led to the massacre.

Moore conducts an interview with Evan McCollum, Director of Communications at a Lockheed Martin plant near Columbine, and asks him:

So you don't think our kids say to themselves, 'Dad goes off to the factory every day, he builds missiles of mass destruction.' What's the difference between that mass destruction and the mass destruction over at Columbine High School?

McCollum responds:

I guess I don't see that specific connection because the missiles that you're talking about were built and designed to defend us from somebody else who would be aggressors against us.

Additionally, Moore shows footage of rockets/missiles being transported under the cover of darkness so locals won't realize what is being made in their community. Actually, they were transported in the late night or early morning so as to cause the least disruption to traffic.

After the release of the film, McCollum clarified that the plant no longer produces missiles (the plant manufactured parts for intercontinental ballistic missiles with a nuclear warhead in the mid-1980s), but rockets used for launching satellites:

I provided specific information to Moore about the space launch vehicles we build to launch spacecraft for NASA, NOAA, the Dept. of Defense and commercial customers, including DirecTV and EchoStar.

=== "What a Wonderful World" montage ===
The film cuts to a montage of American foreign policy decisions, with the intent to counter McCollum's statement by citing examples of how the United States has frequently been the aggressor nation. This montage is set to the song "What a Wonderful World", performed by Louis Armstrong.

The following is a transcript of the onscreen text in the Wonderful World segment:

1. 1953: U.S. overthrows Prime Minister Mosaddegh of Iran. U.S. installs Shah as dictator.
2. 1954: U.S. overthrows democratically elected President Árbenz of Guatemala. 200,000 civilians killed.
3. 1963: U.S. backs assassination of South Vietnamese President Diem.
4. 1963–75: American military kills 4 million civilians in Southeast Asia.
5. September 11, 1973: U.S. stages coup in Chile. Democratically elected President Salvador Allende assassinated. Dictator Augusto Pinochet installed. 5,000 Chileans murdered.
6. 1977: U.S. backs military rulers of El Salvador. 70,000 Salvadorans and four American nuns killed.
7. 1980s: U.S. trains Osama bin Laden and fellow terrorists to kill Soviets. CIA gives them $3 billion.
8. 1981: Reagan administration trains and funds "contras". 30,000 Nicaraguans die.
9. 1982: U.S. provides billions in aid to Saddam Hussein for weapons to kill Iranians.
10. 1983: White House secretly gives Iran weapons to help them kill Iraqis.
11. 1989: CIA agent Manuel Noriega (also serving as President of Panama) disobeys orders from Washington. U.S. invades Panama and removes Noriega. 3,000 Panamanian civilian casualties.
12. 1990: Iraq invades Kuwait with weapons from U.S.
13. 1991: U.S. enters Iraq. Bush reinstates dictator of Kuwait.
14. 1998: Clinton bombs "weapons factory" in Sudan. Factory turns out to be making aspirin.
15. 1991 to 2003: American planes bomb Iraq on a weekly basis. U.N. estimates 500,000 Iraqi children die from bombing and sanctions.
16. 2000–01: U.S. gives Taliban-ruled Afghanistan $245 million in "aid".
17. September 11, 2001: Osama bin Laden uses his expert CIA training to murder 3,000 people.

The montage ends with handheld-camera footage of United Airlines Flight 175 crashing into the South Tower of the World Trade Center on September 11, 2001, the audio consisting solely of the emotional reactions of the witnesses, recorded by the camera's microphone. On the website accompanying the film, Moore provides additional background information for this section.

=== Climate of fear ===
Moore contrasts his portrayal of the U.S. attitude toward guns and violence with the attitude prevailing in areas of Canada where gun ownership is at similar levels to the U.S. He illustrates his thesis by visiting neighborhoods in Windsor, Ontario, Canada near the Canada–U.S. border, where he finds front doors unlocked and much less concern over crime and security. In regards to the film, Farber states "Moore's thesis, which he later elaborated in Fahrenheit 9/11, is that the fear-mongering that permeates American society contributes to our epidemic of gun violence". Moore shows news stories in Canada which do not follow the "if it bleeds it leads" mentality. This adds to Moore's argument that the media is driving America's fear and their need for protection. The cartoon "A Brief History of the United States of America" encompasses Moore's view of where the fear in America started and how it has progressed and changed over the years.

In this section, there is a montage of several social pundits stating possible causes for gun violence. Many claim links with violence in television, cinema, and video games; towards the end of the montage, however, the same people all change their claims to Marilyn Manson's responsibility. Following this is an interview between Moore and Marilyn Manson. Manson shares his views about the United States' climate with Moore, stating that he believes U.S. society is based on "fear and consumption", citing Colgate commercials that promise "if you have bad breath, [people] are not going to talk to you" and other commercials containing fear-based messages. Manson also mentions that the media, under heavy government influence, had asserted that his influence on the acts of Klebold and Harris was far greater than that of President Clinton, who ordered more bombings on Kosovo on April 20, 1999, than any other day during the NATO campaign against Yugoslavia. When Moore asks Manson what he would say to the students at Columbine, Manson replies, "I wouldn't say a single word to them; I would listen to what they have to say, and that's what no one did."

South Park co-creator Matt Stone—who grew up in Littleton—agreed to talk with Moore about his hometown and the shooting in the film. Although he did not feel that Moore mischaracterized him or his statements in the film, he harbored ill feelings about the cartoon "A Brief History of the United States of America". Both Stone and his fellow South Park creator Trey Parker felt that the cartoon was done in a style very similar to theirs, and its proximity to Stone's interview may have led viewers to believe that they created the cartoon. "It was a good lesson in what Michael Moore does in films. He doesn't necessarily say explicitly this is what it is, but he creates meaning where there is none by cutting things together," Stone remarked in a later interview. As a humorous retort to this, Stone and Parker portrayed Moore as "a gibbering, overweight, hot-dog-eating buffoon" who ultimately commits a suicide bombing against the protagonists in their 2004 film Team America: World Police.

=== Statistics ===
Moore follows up by exploring popular explanations as to why gun violence is so high in the United States. He examines Marilyn Manson as a cause, but states that more German citizens listen to Marilyn Manson (per capita) and that the country has a larger Goth population than the United States, with less gun violence (Germany: 381 incidents per year). He examines violent movies, but notes that other countries have the same violent movies, showing The Matrix with French subtitles (France: 255 incidents per year). He also examines video games, but observes that many violent video games come from Japan (Japan: 39 incidents per year). He concludes his comparisons by considering the suggestion that the United States' violent history is the cause, but notes the similarly violent histories of Germany, Japan, France, and the United Kingdom (68 incidents per year). Moore ends this segment with gun-related-deaths-per-year statistics of the following countries:

| Country | Gun-Related Deaths | Per 100,000 |
|---|---|---|
| Japan | 39 | 0.030 |
| Australia | 65 | 0.292 |
| United Kingdom | 68 | 0.109 |
| Canada | 165 | 0.484 |
| France | 255 | 0.389 |
| Germany | 381 | 0.466 |
| United States | 11,127 | 3.601 |

=== Kmart refund ===
Moore takes two Columbine survivors, Mark Taylor and Richard Castaldo (along with Brooks Brown, who remains unidentified during the segment), to the Troy, Michigan headquarters of American superstore Kmart to claim a refund on the bullets still lodged in their bodies, which were purchased by the perpetrators at a Kmart store. Moore and the victims wait for hours in the building's lobby, speaking to several Kmart employees, who evade the issue. Moore then decides to visit a Kmart in nearby Sterling Heights, where they purchase the store's entire supply of ammunition, and the three return to the company's headquarters the following day with several members of the local media. The company's vice president of communications is quickly sent down to address Moore and the press, and announces that the company will phase out handgun ammunition sales within 90 days. "We've won," says Moore, in disbelief. "That was more than we asked for."

=== Charlton Heston interview ===
For the final scene of the film, Moore visits Charlton Heston's home and asks to speak to him via the speakerbox in front of his gated home. Heston declines to speak to him at the time, but agrees to look at his schedule for the next day. Moore returns and first shows his NRA card, which Heston expresses pleasure at. They go inside the large property and sit down to discuss American firearm violence. Heston's response includes the suggestions that the United States has a "history of violence" and more "mixed ethnicity" than other countries. He also states that he does not believe that the United States is any more violent than other countries. Moore then asks Heston if he would like to apologize for leading NRA rallies in Flint, Michigan (Moore's hometown) after the shooting death of a six-year-old girl at Buell Elementary School and in Littleton after the Columbine shooting. Heston claims he did not know about the girl's death or how soon the rally was after it. When Moore presses to know if he would have cancelled the rally, he declines to answer and walks out of the interview. Moore implores him not to leave and asks him to look at a picture of the girl. Heston turns around, but then turns back to continue his exit. Upon his exit, Moore leaves the picture outside the home. Moore was later criticized by some for his perceived "ambush" of the actor. Heston later announced he had been diagnosed with Alzheimer's disease.

"I'm uncomfortable watching the scene now, and I'm uncomfortable sitting there with him," Moore told Vanity Fair's Katey Rich in 2019. "But I wasn't going to not put it in the film either. He revealed his core beliefs. But I remember feeling kind of sad about it later. Here's a man who 40 years prior to that marched with Martin Luther King, and now in his elderly years had just turned into this angry white guy who believed that we should have these laws where it's O.K. to shoot first and ask questions later."

=== Dedication ===
The film is dedicated to the memory of three people who all died in gun related circumstances:

- John Alberts, a sound designer and mixer for much of Moore's work. He had initially been hired to do the sound work on the film, but killed himself with a gun in January 2001.
- Herbert "Sluggo" Cleaves Jr., the oldest child of two of Moore's closest friends. He was shot in the stomach in a drive-by shooting and died at an area hospital in February 2001.
- Laura Wilcox, a victim of handgun violence who was killed in the 2001 Nevada County shootings. Her death led to the implementation of Laura's Law, which allows compulsory treatment of patients with violent psychiatric disorders.

== Release ==
=== Critical reception ===
The film earned overwhelming positive reviews from critics. On the review aggregator Rotten Tomatoes, it holds a 95% approval rating based on 173 reviews, with an average rating of 8.20/10. The consensus states, "Though it may not always convince, Bowling for Columbine asks important questions and provokes thought." Another score aggregator, Metacritic, which assigns a weighted average rating in the 0–100 range based on reviews from top mainstream critics, calculated a score of 72 based on 32 reviews, signifying 'generally favorable reviews'.

Michael Wilmington of the Chicago Tribune wrote, "It's unnerving, stimulating, likely to provoke anger and sorrow on both political sides—and, above all, it's extremely funny." A.O. Scott of The New York Times wrote, "The slippery logic, tendentious grandstanding, and outright demagoguery on display in Bowling for Columbine should be enough to give pause to its most ardent partisans, while its disquieting insights into the culture of violence in America should occasion sober reflection from those who would prefer to stop their ears."

In a negative review, The Wall Street Journal said the film was "filled with so many inaccuracies and distortions that it ought to be classed as a work of fiction." The Boston Review said the film contained "deliberate falsehoods", highlighting the interview with Heston which Moore selectively edited and rearranged to "create the stupid, callous white guy he attacks." Desson Thomson of The Washington Post thought that the film lacked a coherent message, asking "A lot of this is amusing and somehow telling. There was a parody of this movie called 'Bowling for Midway', a conservative Utah family movie to counter Moore's movie, and this paralleled the Docudrama, 'This Divided State'. But what does it all add up to?"

The American Prospect published a piece by Garance Franke-Ruta criticizing the film for ignoring the role that municipal governance plays in crime in the United States, and ignoring African-American urban victims of violence while focusing on the unusual events of Columbine. "A decline in murders in New York City alone—from 1,927 in 1993 to 643 in 2001—had, for example, a considerable impact on the declining national rate. Not a lot of those killers or victims were the sort of sports-hunters or militiamen Moore goes out of his way to interview and make fun of."

=== MPAA rating ===
The film was rated R by the Motion Picture Association of America, which means that children under the age of 17 were not admitted to see the film theatrically unless under supervision. Film critic Roger Ebert chastized the MPAA for this move as "banning teenagers from those films they most need to see". Ebert had criticized the MPAA rating system on previous occasions. The film was noted for "some violent images and language".

=== Gross revenue ===
With a budget of $4 million, Bowling for Columbine grossed $58,008,423 worldwide, including $21,576,018 in the United States. The documentary also broke box office records internationally, becoming the highest-grossing documentary in the United Kingdom, Australia, and Austria. These records were later eclipsed by Moore's next documentary, Fahrenheit 9/11.

== Awards and nominations ==
- 2002 Winner, 55th Anniversary Prize, 2002 Cannes Film Festival
- 2002 Winner, VPRO IDFA Audience Award, International Documentary Film Festival Amsterdam
- 2003 Winner, César Awards, Best Foreign Film
- 2003 Winner, International Documentary Association (IDA) - Best Documentary of All Time
- 2003 Winner, Academy Award, Best Documentary Feature

During the screening at the 2002 Cannes Film Festival the film received a 13-minute standing ovation. It also won "Most Popular International Film" at the 2002 Vancouver International Film Festival.

Moore was both applauded and booed at the Academy Awards on March 23, 2003, when he used his acceptance speech as an opportunity to proclaim his opposition to the presidency of George W. Bush and the United States-led invasion of Iraq, which had begun just a few days earlier.

In 2005, it was voted the third most popular film in the British Channel 4 program The 50 Greatest Documentaries of all time.

== Home media ==
Bowling for Columbine was released on VHS and DVD by MGM Home Entertainment on August 19, 2003. The film was released on DVD and Blu-ray in a digital restoration with supplementary features by the Criterion Collection in June 2018.
