= People en Español =

Spanish-language American online magazine

- People en Español cover with Jennifer Lopez (February 2016)
- Editor: Maria Morales
- Categories: Celebrity, human interest, news
- Frequency: Monthly
- Format: Print (1996–2022); Online only (2022–present)
- Total circulation: 569,081 (2011)
- Founded: 1996; 30 years ago
- Final issue: April 2022 (print)
- Company: People Inc.
- Country: United States
- Language: Spanish
- Website: peopleenespanol.com

People en Español is a Spanish-language American online magazine. Distinguishing itself from its English-language counterpart, People en Español's original editorial content combines coverage from the Hispanic and general world of entertainment, articles on fashion and beauty, and human interest stories. As of 2009, it was the Spanish-language magazine with the largest readership in the United States, reaching 7.1 million readers with each issue.

Dotdash Meredith began publishing it in 1996, originally as the Spanish-language edition of its publication People. It was created and launched by Time Warner media executive Lisa Garcia Quiroz. Angelo Figueroa was the magazine's founding managing editor, who led the editorial department for its first five years. In 2022, it ceased printed editions and releases its issues online.

== History ==
Time Inc. launched the Spanish-language edition of People magazine in 1996. The company has said in The New York Times that the new publication emerged after a 1995 issue of the original magazine was distributed with two distinct covers, one featuring slain Tejano singer Selena and another cover with cast members from Friends; the Selena cover sold out while the other did not.

Though the original idea was that Spanish-language translations of articles from the English magazine would comprise half the content of the newer publication, People en Español over time came to have a mix of 90% original content and 10% translated material perceived by editors to have inter-cultural importance.

Because the readership comprises Spanish-speakers of diverse backgrounds, the editorial staff goes to great lengths to use as neutral a variety of Spanish as possible. Staff member Betty Cortina told The Washington Post in 1996, "We police each other as we edit, making sure that we maintain a high-level, slang-free Spanish. We're trying to bust the myth that everyone wants a different kind of Spanish."

The magazine has received a number of accolades, including being named one of the "Most Notable Magazine Launches of the Past 20 Years" by Media Industry News (MIN). In April 2006, its publisher at the time, Jacqueline Hernández, was named Adweek Marketing y Medios' Executive of the Year. In March, 2007, People en Español was listed on Adweek's Hot List "10 under 50" for the fourth consecutive year.

=== Peopleenespanol.com ===
PeopleEnEspanol.com logo.

Peopleenespanol was originally established as the accompanying website of the magazine, covering the latest Hispanic celebrity news, photos, gossip, fashion and beauty. In April 2007, a bilingual version of the site was developed for the first time, debuting with the launch of "Los 50 Más Bellos" 2007 exclusive content. On October 19, 2007, the website was redesigned and relaunched with new content channels and video player.

In 2014, People en Español launched an in-book insert in English called Chica, targeted at millennial Latinas. In 2016, Chica launched as an English language content vertical in the site. Charo Henríquez served as editor of People en Español from 2015 to 2017.

In February 2022, People en Español announced it would end print circulation and switch to an all digital format.

== Special issues ==
Among the eleven issues that People en Español releases a year, there are several special issues including June's "Los 50 Más Bellos" (50 Most Beautiful), and December's "Estrella del Año" (Star of the Year). Special issues debuting in 2007 include February's "Los 100 Hispanos Más Influyentes" (100 Most Influential Hispanics) and November's "Sexiest Man Alive" issue, similar to People magazine's established franchise.

== Los 50 Más Bellos ==
Since 1997, every June issue celebrates the most attractive Latino stars from the world of film, television, music, sports and politics. The list began with the Spring 1997 issue as the "25 Bellezas" (25 Beauties). In 2004, then-editor Richard Pérez-Feria increased the list to 50 and renamed the issue "50 Más Bellos" (50 Most Beautiful), in line with the People magazine franchise. For the June 2007 issue, then-editor Peter Castro selected the first non-Hispanic star to grace the Most Beautiful cover by placing Beyoncé Knowles along with seven other Latin stars on the cover, and including her within the magazine as the 51st "honorary beauty."

Since 2002, the magazine has hosted an annual celebrity-attended event honoring the Most Beautiful in New York City during Television upfront week in May. Telemundo produced a two-hour special around the event from 2003 to 2007.

=== Most Beautiful Cover Subjects ===
| Year | Cover Person | Notes |
|---|---|---|
| 2011 | Elizabeth Gutiérrez, Kate del Castillo, William Levy, Alejandra Guzmán, Blanca Soto, Angelique Boyer, Dulce Maria, Ilia Calderon | Spread Cover |
| 2010 | Belinda, Daisy Fuentes, Fernando Colunga, Jacqueline Bracamontes, Giselle Blondet, Sofía Vergara, Olga Tañón, Adamari López | Spread Cover |
| 2009 | Maite Perroni, Eva Longoria, Catherine Siachoque, Karla Monroig, Dayana Mendoza, Ana de la Reguera, Edith González, Ana Bárbara, Bárbara Bermudo, Lili Estefan | Spread Cover |
| 2008 | Christina Aguilera, Dayanara Torres, Danna García, Sofía Vergara, Angélica Rivera, Ivy Queen, Myrka Dellanos, Marlene Favela, | Spread Cover |
| 2007 | Angélica Vale, Adamari López, Alejandro Fernández, Beyoncé Knowles, Mario Lopez, Candela Ferro, Bárbara Bermudo, Ludwika Paleta | Spread Cover |
| 2006 | Jennifer Lopez | Spread Cover |
| 2005 | Paulina Rubio, María Celeste Arrarás, Dayanara Torres, Gloria Estefan, Paola Rey, Daisy Fuentes, Sonia Braga, Inés Rivero, Karyme Lozano | Three Page Cover. Six different versions of the cover featuring "divas" in different order were produced for different regions. |
| 2004 | Juan Soler, Myrka Dellanos, Roselyn Sánchez, Bárbara Mori, Nicholas Gonzalez, Michelle Rodriguez, Eduardo Verastegui, Luis Fonsi | Spread Cover |
| 2003 | Thalía | Final year to be called "Las 25 Bellezas" |
| 2002 | Paulina Rubio | |
| 2001 | Shakira | |
| 2000 | Juan Soler | |
| 1999 | Alejandro Fernández | |
| 1998 | Carlos Ponce | |
| 1997 | Ricky Martin | |

=== Bello 51 ===
In 2008 and 2009, People en Español teamed up with Yahoo! En Espanol and Telemundo to launch a nationwide search for the "51st Most Beautiful (El Bello 51)" to be featured in its "50 Most Beautiful" issue. The "51st Most Beautiful" search provides a unique opportunity for a non-celebrity to be featured in this celebrated issue. From January to February, Yahoo! En Espanol users had the opportunity to submit their photos at 51bello.com to compete for the title of People en Español's "51st Most Beautiful." In the weeks that follow, 25 finalists, as selected by People en Español, Yahoo! En Espanol and Telemundo, were to be posted on 51bello.com. During this time users were able to view contestant photos and profiles, comment and vote for their favorites.

== Estrellas del Año ==
People en Español introduced the "Estrella del Año" (Star of the Year) issue in 2004, revealing the year's most unforgettable Hispanic personality, along with the significant events that defined the year. The release of this December/January issue is followed by a celebrity-attended event in Miami. In 2007, the magazine introduced the franchise as Estrellas del Año, honoring multiple entertainers that defined Hispanic entertainment. The Estrellas del Año issue has since been retired and replaced with the Premios People en Español issue, which made its debut in November 2009.

=== Estrellas del Año cover subjects ===
| Year | Cover Person | Notes |
|---|---|---|
| 2008 | Shakira, Charytín and Chayanne | Issue featured 3 consecutive front covers. Chayanne was on the front of Puerto Rico newsstand edition |
| 2007 | Angélica Vale, Adamari López and Kate del Castillo | First issue as a multi-celebrity "Estrellas del Año" package |
| 2006 | Adamari López and Luis Fonsi | First issue with "Estrellas del Año" logo due to honoring of Lopez and Fonsi as a romantic pair. |
| 2005 | Paulina Rubio | |
| 2004 | Myrka Dellanos | |

== Exclusives ==
The magazine has been known to break world exclusives pertaining to Hispanic celebrities.

Puerto Rican actress Adamari López gave the magazine a world exclusive for their May 2006 issue, speaking for the first time since her breast cancer diagnosis kept her away from the media. Lopez shared with the magazine's editors the details of battling her illness and her relationship with the popular singer Luis Fonsi.

In an exclusive interview in the March 2007 issue, Mexican soap opera legend Verónica Castro, spoke about her estranged son, singer Cristian Castro, and the real reason for the animosity with daughter-in-law, Valeria Liberman. The actress also discussed her disappointment when Cristian Castro caused quite a media stir after his reconciliation with his father, comic Manuel Valdés.

In late August 2007, the magazine revealed that Cristian Castro had separated from his second wife. An exclusive interview was published in the October 2007 issue (on sale September 3, 2007) with a cover line quoting "Quiero Ser Libre (I Want to Be Free)." Despite personally speaking to the magazine, Castro later denied what he said in the interview and hiding the divorce suit he presented in Miami. Castro emphasized that he will always lie to the press about his personal life. "I don't want the press to know about my personal life. I'm not here to share it; I'm here to sing. I will always lie to the press. Always expect lies about my personal life." He has since admitted to filing for divorce, but withdrew papers the next day.

In the November 2008 issue, People en Español took an in depth look at the marital troubles between Cuban-American journalist Myrka Dellanos and her husband of only six months, Ulysses Alonzo. Friends and sources close to the couple spoke exclusively with People en Español detailing what really lead to Dellanos' frantic 911 call and the battery charges against Alonzo.

== Official title ==
The company usually gives the title in all capital letters as PEOPLE EN ESPAÑOL when being discussed in Spanish (including on its own website). Any references in English are as People en Español (including on the company's own media kit). This follows English-language conventions of capitalization, as the Spanish language does not capitalize proper nouns relating to nationality or language.

== See also ==
- Hispanic
