= Carey McWilliams =

Carey McWilliams may refer to:

- Carey McWilliams (journalist) (1905–1980), American journalist and lawyer
- Carey McWilliams (marksman) (born 1973), blind marksman, author, and skydiver

== See also ==
- Wilson Carey McWilliams (1933–2005), American political scientist, son of the journalist
