= Sevcec =

- Genre: Talk show
- Created by: Joaquin Blaya
- Presented by: Pedro Sevcec
- Theme music composer: Omar Marchant
- Country of origin: United States
- Original language: Spanish
- No. of seasons: 5

Production
- Production locations: Raleigh Studios; Hollywood, California, United States
- Running time: 60 minutes

Original release
- Network: Telemundo
- Release: 1994 – 1999

Sevcec is a Spanish-language talk show, hosted by journalist Pedro Sevcec and broadcast by Telemundo from 1994 until 1999. It aired weekdays at 4:00 p.m. from 1994 through 1998 and at 2:00 p.m from 1998-1999 Eastern Time.

== Broadcast history ==
The show was created in 1994 by Telemundo's then-president Joaquin Blaya, who also helped create the Cristina show during his years as president of rival network Univision. Pedro Sevcec, who at the time was a co-anchor and reporter for Ocurrió Así, was selected to host and the show was titled Sevcec after his last name. It was the first American Spanish-language talk show to have a male host, with Sevcec being dubbed the "Latin Phil Donahue".

The show became a success, taping over 1,200 episodes and winning seven Emmy Awards. However, with the show being up against the long-running Cristina in the 4:00 p.m. timeslot, Sevcec's ratings began to decline and it was cancelled in 1999. Laura en America took over the timeslot upon its arrival to the network that year.
