= Jacqueline Hernández =

American multimedia businesswoman

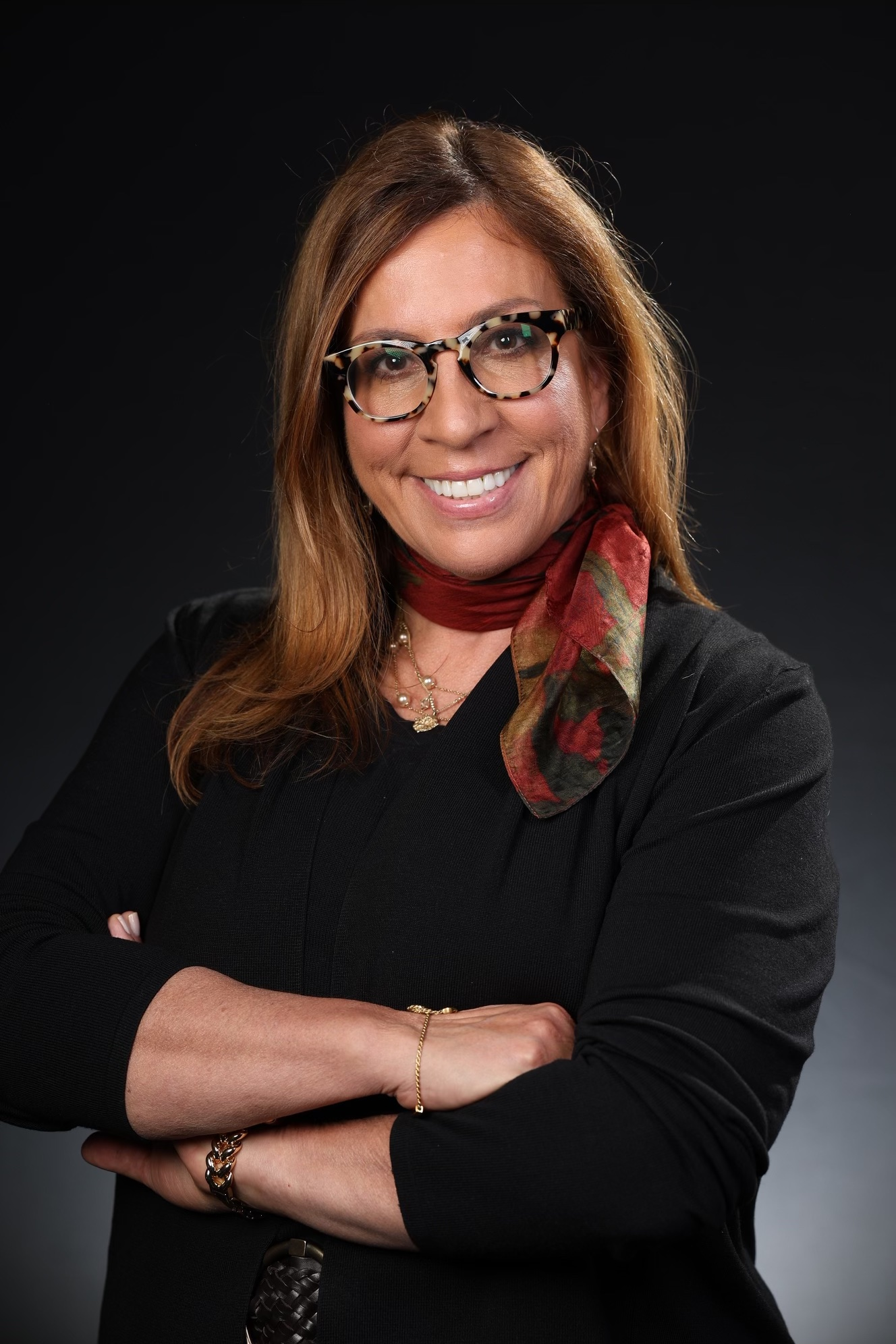
- Born: Manhattan, New York
- Education: B.A., Tufts University; M.B.A., Baruch College
- Occupations: Founder, New Majority Ready
- Employer: New Majority Ready
- Known for: Media executive leadership; Generation Z and multicultural marketing
- Spouse: Jack Rico
- Website: https://newmajorityready.com

Jacqueline Hernández is an American business executive and entrepreneur. She is the founder and chief executive officer of New Majority Ready, a marketing strategy and content development firm. Hernández serves on the boards of directors of Victoria's Secret & Co. and MediaCo Holding Inc.

Hernández previously served as interim chief executive officer of MediaCo Holding, chief marketing officer of NBCUniversal Hispanic Enterprises and Content, chief operating officer of Telemundo Enterprises, and president of Combate Americas. Earlier in her career, she was publisher of People en Español and Teen People.

Her career has spanned media, marketing, and business operations, with a focus on multicultural and youth audiences.

== Personal life ==
Hernández was born in New York City to Diego and Mercedes Hernández. She attended high school at the Birch Wathen Lenox School in Manhattan and graduated a year ahead of schedule. During that year, she attended Advanced Placement classes at Cornell University in Ithaca, New York.

Jacqueline went on to attend Tufts University in Medford, Massachusetts, where she graduated with a B.A. in English and art history in 1988. She later completed graduate studies with an M.B.A. in marketing from Baruch College.

She currently lives in New York City and is married to journalist and television personality Jack Rico, former host of NBC and Telemundo's Consumer 101.

== Professional career ==
=== MediaCo (2024) ===
Jacqueline Hernández was appointed interim chief executive officer of MediaCo Holding Inc. following MediaCo's acquisition of Estrella Media's content, digital and commercial operations. The transaction brought EstrellaTV and its digital operations together with MediaCo's New York radio stations HOT 97 and WBLS. Hernández served as interim CEO from April 17 to October 28, 2024.

=== New Majority Ready (2019 - Present) ===
Hernández is the founder and CEO of New Majority Ready, a marketing and content development firm launched in 2019. The company helps businesses and brands adapt their strategies to an evolving multicultural demographic landscape with an approach that includes marketing strategy, brand positioning, creative direction, data analysis, innovative audience strategies, and relevant content creation.

Hernández and Adriana Waterston are co-authors of the forthcoming book Gen Z AF, which examines Generation Z and its implications for marketing.

=== Combate Americas ===
Hernández joined Combate Americas as president to help drive the company's continued growth and the launch of several events. Under her leadership, the company secured distribution deals with DAZN and GOL, as well as a worldwide streaming agreement with Facebook Watch. Hernández's contributions were recognized in 2019 when Cynopsis named her one of the Leading Women in Sports.

=== NBCUniversal (2014 - 2017) ===
Hernández was promoted to Chief Marketing Officer for NBCUniversal Hispanic Enterprises and Content, directly reporting to the chairman. In this role, she led marketing efforts across NBCU's television, cable, digital, theme parks and film properties to strengthen their reach and engagement with Hispanic audiences.

This initiative entailed cross-promotions across all of NBCUniversal's properties, including the Latin Billboard Awards and "VIVA TODAY," a week-long celebration of Hispanic culture on the TODAY Show.

In 2014, Hernández described ambicultural U.S. Hispanics as "200 percenters," meaning 100 percent Latino and 100 percent American.

=== NBCUniversal Telemundo Enterprises (2008 - 2014) ===
Jacqueline Hernández assumed the role of Chief Operating Officer at Telemundo Media in April 2008. In this position, she was responsible for overseeing the P&L and running operations for domestic revenue, brand marketing, consumer insights, and branded entertainment. Additionally, she oversaw mun2, Telemundo's cable youth network, and led Telemundo Media's Digital and Emerging Business team to strengthen the network's digital footprint.

Hernández worked towards unifying all sales, marketing, and domestic growth platforms for the integrated Telemundo network and its station group. She was instrumental in launching Hispanics at NBCU, a company-wide initiative aimed at integrating Hispanic media more thoroughly into the broader company framework.

In 2012, she led Telemundo's rebranding campaign, "The Power of T," which aimed to represent the network's audience's dual identity and connection to Latin roots and their contemporary American lifestyle. Telemundo experienced a 19% increase in its national prime-time audience reaching 1.2 million viewers and increasing ad revenue by 20%. Hernández's accomplishments have been recognized with various awards, including being named one of Advertising Age's "100 Most Influential Women in Advertising" and one of Broadcasting & Cable's 2011 Next Wave of Leaders.

=== People en Español (2004 - 2008) ===
In 2004, Hernández was appointed publisher of People en Español's print and digital properties, marking her initial focus on the U.S. Hispanic demographic. The following year, she also took on the role of publisher for Teen People. Under her leadership, People en Español experienced consecutive annual double-digit circulation growth for three years. In March 2007, the publication was included on Adweek's Hot List "10 under 50" for four consecutive years. Hernández also played a pivotal role in the bilingual relaunch of PeopleEnEspañol.com, the magazine's website. As a result of her work during this time, she was named Adweek's "Marketing y Medios" 'Executive of the Year' in 2006, and was recognized as one of Advertising Age's "Women to Watch in 2007.

=== Turner Broadcasting (2000 -2004) ===
Hernández was employed by CNN International in 2000 to oversee the company's international interactive strategy, where she led more than 20 individual country websites, including in-language sites for Latin America (CNNenEspanol.com), Brazil (CNNbrazil.com), and Japan (CNN.co.jp). She was later responsible for managing television and integrated sponsorships on Turner's international media properties, including TNT Latin America and Cartoon Network.

=== Time Inc. (1996 - 2000) ===
In 1996, following prior work at The Boston Globe and The Village Voice, Hernández joined Time Inc., where she was marketing director of Time Inc. Latin America and International. She received the President's Award for playing a lead role in developing the first bilingual, cross-platform media program reaching audiences across TIME, CNN, CNNenEspañol, and Fortune.

== Board of directors positions ==
=== Victoria's Secret ===
In 2021, Hernández was appointed to the board of directors of Victoria's Secret & Co., a publicly traded retailer listed on the New York Stock Exchange under the ticker symbol VSXY. She serves on the Human Capital and Compensation Committee and the Nominating and Governance Committee.

=== Estrella Media ===
Hernández previously served on the board of directors of Estrella Media, where she was a member of the Compensation Committee.

=== Isos Acquisition Corporation ===
Hernández held the role of Director at Isos Acquisition Corporation, a special-purpose acquisition company. This special purpose acquisition company facilitated a merger between itself and Bowlero Corp, valuing the combined company at $2.6 billion. Upon the completion of the merger in December 2021, Bowlero became a publicly traded company listed on the NYSE under the ticker symbol “BOWL.”

== Awards and honors ==
2025: Baruch College Alumni Changemakers Award

2022: Al Día News “Archetype Award” (Media)

2019: Cynopsis Top Women In Media (Sports)

2017: Fortune's The 50 Most Powerful Latinas of 2017

2016: CableFax's “Most Powerful Women in Cable”

2014: The Hollywood Reporter's "Top 25 Latinos in Entertainment"

2013: The Hollywood Reporter's "Power 100 Women in Entertainment"

2013: CableFax’s “The Top 50 Most Powerful Women in Cable”

2013: Promax BDA's “Brand Builder Awards”

2013: CableFax's “The 100 Cable's Top Power Players”

2013: Multichannel News “Wonder Women”

2012: The Hollywood Reporter's “Power 100 Women in Entertainment”

2012: Advertising Age's "100 Most Influential Women in Advertising”

2011: People en Español Magazine's “25 Mujeres Más Poderosas”

2011: CableFax's “Programming Hall of Fame Inductee”

2011: The Imagen Foundation's “Most Powerful and Influential Latinos in Entertainment”

2011: The Innovator ADColor Award

2009: People en Español Magazine's “25 Mujeres Más Poderosas”

2007: Advertising Age's “Women to Watch in 2007”

2006: Adweek's Marketing y Medios "Executive of the Year"

2005: Advertising Age's “Top 10 Power Players in Hispanic Media”
