= María Celeste Arrarás =

Puerto Rican journalist (born 1960)

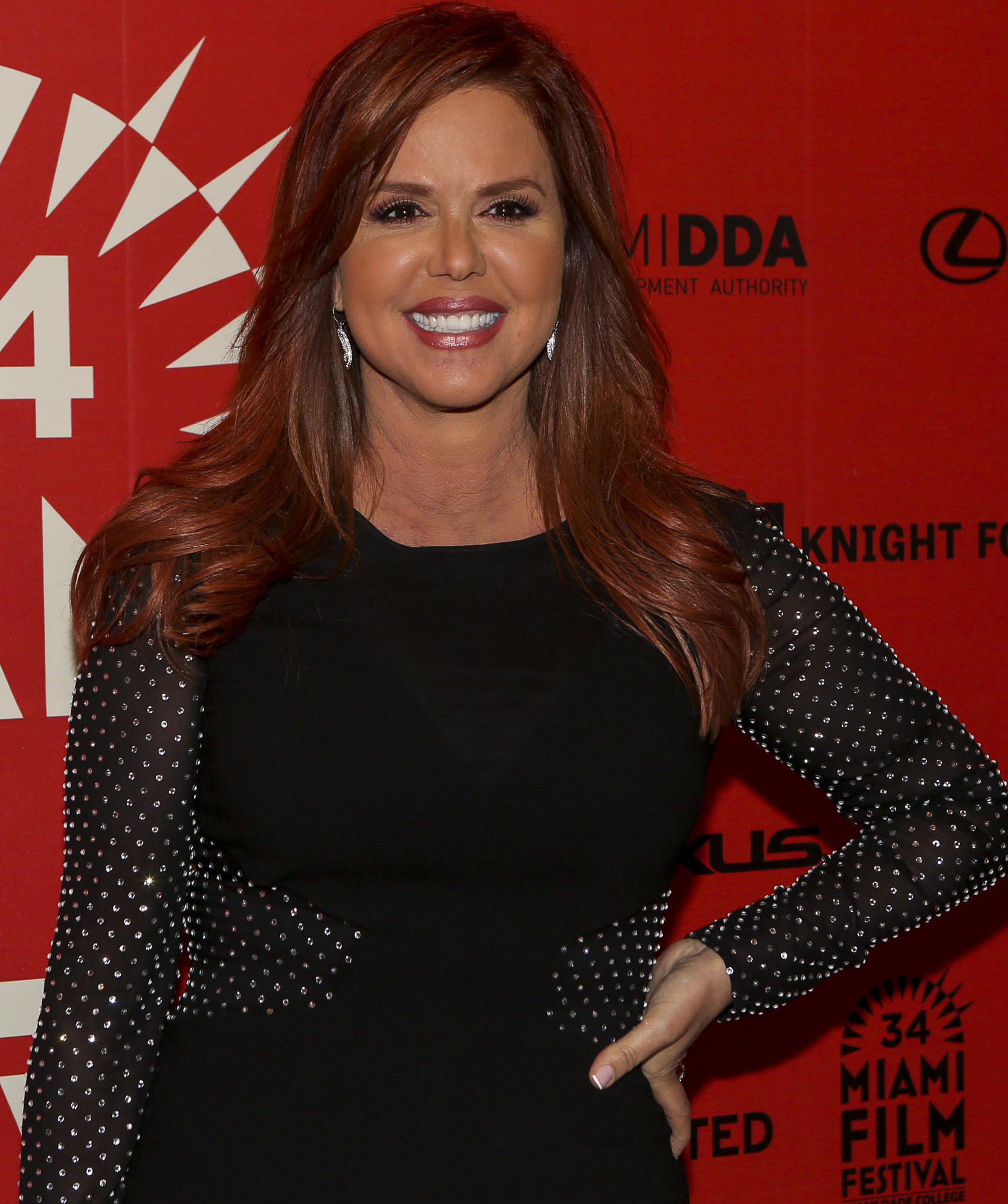
- Arrarás at the 2017 Miami International Film Festival
- Born: María Celeste Arrarás Mangual; September 27, 1960 (age 66); Mayagüez, Puerto Rico
- Education: Loyola University New Orleans (BA)
- Spouse: 3
- Partner: Raúl Quintero (2022-2024; his death)
- Children: 3
- Website: Official website

María Celeste Arrarás Mangual (born September 27, 1960), better known as María Celeste, is a Puerto Rican broadcast journalist, author, and television personality, who has won three national Emmy Awards for journalism. In 2005, she became the first female recipient of the Legacy Award by Broadcast and Multi Channel for outstanding achievement in Hispanic Television. In 2006, Arrarás was included on the cover of Newsweek magazine, as one of the 20 most powerful women of the next generation of leaders.” In August 2018, María Celeste was awarded with a Doctorate Honoris Causa from the Universidad Central de Bayamon in Puerto Rico, in recognition for her philanthropic work. Until August 2020, Arrarás spent two decades as the host and managing editor of Al Rojo Vivo con María Celeste. Her program aired daily in the U.S. and in 15 Latin American countries, for a total daily audience of 35 million viewers. Her popularity has made her one of the most influential Hispanic figures in social platforms, with millions of followers around the world and in 2019 she made her debut in the Hollywood Reporter's Social Climber Chart at #5 of all TV Personalities. ,

Maria Celeste is also executive producer and screenplay writer for Selena’s Secret, a miniseries based on the bestselling book of the same title that she wrote about the murder of singer Selena Quintanilla, known as the Queen of Tejano Music. The mini series aired on Amazon Prime video, TNT Latin America and on Telemundo. In 2019, Maria Celeste received the St Jude Hospital Lifetime Achievement Award.

As of the Summer of 2021 Maria Celeste has joined CNN en Español as the host of their new Sunday Prime Time show called DocuFilms con María Celeste Arrarás. In her capacity as a writer, she also became the first Hispanic opinion maker contributor for Facebook’s new platform “Bulletin”. She also launched her YouTube channel and premiered MC Live, a weekly one-on-one interview program that quickly surpassed 1 million views.

== Early life and education ==
María Celeste Arrarás was born in Mayagüez, Puerto Rico, the first child of José Enrique Arrarás, a politician, lawyer, and educator, and Astrid Mangual, a homemaker and chemist.

In 1971, she won three medals (one gold, one silver, and one bronze) at the Central American and Caribbean Swimming Championships. She qualified to compete at the 1976 Summer Olympics in Montreal, Canada, but was unable to compete after she contracted mononucleosis, one week before the games began.

In 1978, Arrarás left her native Puerto Rico to attend Loyola University in New Orleans, Louisiana, where she majored in communications at Loyola University. In 2016, Arrarás returned to Loyola University, where she was inducted into the School of Mass Communication's Den of Distinction and was honored by Loyola University for her career in television.

== Television career ==
=== Early career ===
Arrarás began her broadcasting career in 1986 when she was employed by a local Puerto Rican television station, Channel 24, as a news anchor and reporter. There, Arrarás traveled covering major news events, such as the fall of the Soviet Union in Moscow and Leningrad, and she received several journalistic awards for her reports. In 1987 the Univision affiliate in New York City WXTV hired her as the co-anchor of its local news show.

=== Univision (1987–2002) ===
Shortly after being hired by Univision, Arrarás became Los Angeles Bureau Chief. In January 1990, when the network moved to Miami, she was named the national news anchor for Noticiero Univision weekend edition.

In 1992, Arrarás was named co-anchor of a new television news program, Noticias y Mas, alongside Myrka Dellanos, which would become Primer Impacto in 1994. The show's popularity resulted in a large franchise for Univision including Primer Impacto Extra, Primer Impacto Edicion Nocturna, and the weekly show Ver Para Creer, all of which were hosted by Arrarás and Dellanos. Arrarás would continue to hold her positions until 2002, when she left the show and joined rival network Telemundo.

=== Telemundo (2002–2020) ===
The defection of María Celeste Arrarás from Univision, North America's largest Spanish-language network, to the rival Telemundo broadcasting group in 2002 sent shockwaves in the industry and was heralded as the start of a new era for Hispanic media. Arrarás's arrival coincided with news that the National Broadcasting Company (NBC)'s $2.7 billion acquisition of the Spanish-language news and entertainment provider had just won U.S. government approval. Arrarás was to host her own Telemundo show, but would also file English-language reports for Dateline, NBC's top-rated prime-time newsmagazine, and work as a guest co-host in NBC's Today show. Arrarás's hire—and the Telemundo/NBC venture—was seen as a sign of an increased Hispanic presence in mainstream media news organizations, and The New York Times journalist Mirta Ojito called the new, lucrative contract for this popular journalist "NBC's first coup in the Latino media". In 2002, the same day that NBC Universal acquired Telemundo as part of their larger network, Arrarás took her former position at Telemundo, becoming the host and Managing Editor of the show Al Rojo Vivo con María Celeste

In 2004, Arrarás co-hosted the Brown-Black Democratic Presidential Debate in Iowa for MSNBC.

Arrarás has crossed-over to the English market. Since 2002 Arrarás has been invited as a guest co-host of NBC's Today show, and according to The New York Times, "Ms. Arrarás's high-profile sally into national network television, in the spot previously occupied by Ms. Couric no less, was groundbreaking for a Spanish-accented broadcaster." She has also contributed to different NBC programs including Dateline and Nightly News. On the night of María Celeste's debut as a contributor for Dateline NBC, the show experienced a dramatic audience increase in both Hispanic and Anglo demographics. NBC president Andrew Lack told the Los Angeles Times, "[María Celeste] was one of the highest segments at Dateline that quarter." He described her as "a serious, smart journalist".

In 2012, Arrarás became co-anchor of Noticiero Telemundo alongside Jose Diaz-Balart. In September 2014 Maria Celeste and her team won an Emmy for its coverage of the election of Pope Francis. One news source stated, the addition of María Celeste is the latest development in a strategy that consolidated "Noticiero Telemundo" as the national newscast with the fastest growing audience on both Spanish and English-language television. In 2016, Arrarás was awarded her third Emmy Award for "Francisco in America", Telemundo's special coverage of Pope Francis's historic visit to Cuba and the USA on September.

After spending four years at the head of Al Rojo Vivo con María Celeste and Noticiero Telemundo, Arraras opted to "dedicate herself fully to Al Rojo Vivo con María Celeste". At that time, she received her third Emmy Award and extended her contract with Telemundo for several more years.

In February 2016, Arrarás served as a panelist for the Republican Party presidential debate held in Houston. Arrarás was cited for her performance. The Washington Post praised her unconventional way of framing issues and said categorically that "she played an important fact-checking role" in that debate.

In the summer of 2016, Arrarás celebrated her 30-year career in television, and was reunited with her former co-host of Primer Impacto, Myrka Dellanos, for a special edition of Al Rojo Vivo commemorating the anniversary. She was recognized by the city of Los Angeles with a resolution commending her work. Puerto Rico, her birthplace, also honored Arrarás by granting her a star on their "Paseo de la Fama de Puerto Rico", their walk of fame. The government also held a special ceremony for Arrarás at the House of Representatives Capitol Building to commemorate her achievements.

On 5 August 2020, Telemundo laid off Arrarás, as part of NBCUniversal's wave of layoffs after poor earnings caused by the COVID-19 pandemic.

=== CNN en Español, Facebook's Bulletin & MC Live (2021) ===
As of the Summer of 2021 Arraras will be part of the staff of CNN en Español, as the host of their Sunday Prime Time show called DocuFilms con María Celeste Arrarás. In her capacity as a writer, she also became the first Hispanic opinion maker contributor for Facebook’s new platform “Bulletin”. In 2021, she also launched her YouTube channel and premiered MC Live, a weekly one-on-one interview program that quickly surpassed 1 million views.

== Awards and honors ==
- In June 2005 she became the first Hispanic journalist to receive a National Emmy in recognition for her career achievements.
- In 2013 she received the Silver Circle Award from the National Academy of Television Arts and Sciences for her outstanding career in journalism.
- In September 2014, and in 2016, Arrarás won two further Emmy awards with the Telemundo news team for their coverage of the election of Pope Francis, and the pontiff's first visit to Cuba.
- In 2016 The Hispanic Association of Corporate Responsibility (HACR) presented Arrarás with a lifetime achievement award to commemorate her 30 years in television and her contributions for the advancement of the Hispanic community in the U.S.
- In 2003 Arrarás was the recipient of the Award for Outstanding Achievement in Hispanic Television presented to her by Broadcasting & Cable and Multichannel News at the Hispanic Television Summit, produced by Schramm Marketing Group.
- In May 2003 Arrarás was honored with her name and hand-prints on a plaque on display in Mexico City's Paseo de los Grandes (Walk of the Great Ones).
- In 2012 she was named "Best Journalist doing Social Good in Social Media" by LATISM, the largest Hispanic social media organization.
- In 2013 she was given the most "social" celebrity award in Premios Tu Mundo because of her mass audience and communication with fans.
- In 2001 she was awarded the PETA Humanitarian Award for her dedication to animal rights campaigns around the globe.
- In 1999 Arrarás won the Génesis, award (National Ark Trust Fund) in recognition for her outstanding work in raising awareness of animal protection issues.
- In 2009 she was named the "Hero of the Environment" by the Monterey Bay Aquarium for her efforts in raising awareness about conserving the planet and its ecosystems.
- In 2012 she was awarded the title of "Ocean Defender" by Wildcoast in recognition for her efforts to defend the earth's coasts and oceans.
- In 2016, The National Council of La Raza (NCLR) presented Arrarás with its Rubén Salazar Award for Communications to commemorate her 30 years in television and her contributions for the advancement of the Hispanic community.
- In 2018, Maria Celeste joins Las Vegas Walk of Stars.
- In 2018, She was the Recipient of Hispanicize 2018 Latinovator Award.
- In 2019, St Jude Children's Research Hospital recognizes Maria Celeste for her philanthropic work on behalf of children with cancer honoring her with the 2019 St. Jude Hospital Lifetime Achievement Award.

== Books ==
Arrarás is also an investigative reporter and writer, and has authored several books.

In 1997, Arrarás wrote Selena‘s Secret: The Revealing Story Behind Her Tragic Death (released in Spanish as El Secreto De Selena: La Reveladora Historia Detrás De Su Trágica Muerte), published by Simon & Schuster. The book describes her in-depth “investigation” surrounding the events that led to the death of singer Selena Quintanilla.

In 2007, Arrarás wrote The Magic Cane (released in Spanish as El Bastón Mágico), a children's fable published by Scholastic.

In 2009, Arrarás published Make Your Life Prime Time: How to Have It All Without Losing Your Soul, (released in Spanish as Vive Tu Vida Al Rojo Vivo: Secretos Para Triunfar En Todo), published by Atria.

== Public image ==
Often cited as the “Hispanic TV Queen”, Arrarás has been described by The New York Times as “a household name in Spanish-speaking homes across the country, and a darling of the Spanish-language media, which turned her into a cover girl for magazine articles that ranged from fitness to the supermom syndrome". She is one of the most popular celebrities today, with over 50 magazine covers under her belt. In 2006, she appeared on the cover of Newsweek after the magazine selected her as one of the “20 Most Powerful Women” of the next generation of leaders. Later that year, Newsweek also had her on the cover of its special international edition dedicated to “Women and Leadership”. She has been featured on the cover of People en Español magazine more than 15 times.

Arrarás has been the judge of the Miss Universe Pageant on two occasions. The first was the 52nd Miss Universe pageant, held in June 2003, where Amelia Vega became the first Dominican candidate to be crowned. Then again in 2006, when Puerto Rican beauty Zuleyka Rivera was crowned in Los Angeles.

She is a vocal environmental and animal rights activist. She has been noted for speaking out against the exploitation of animals, especially in spectacles such as rodeos, aquariums, cock-fights, and circuses. In December 2001, she even went in front of the Puerto Rican Legislature to advocate for a ban in the Island on circuses that forced wild animals to perform as part of their shows. Currently Arrarás is working with The Humane Society of the United States and Humane Society International on a campaign to dramatically improve the welfare of the more than 300,000 stray dogs and one million stray cats in the island.

Maria Celeste is a supporter of Para la Naturaleza, a non-profit organization dedicated to environmental conservation and historic preservation in Puerto Rico. She is also an avid supporter and advocate of other organizations including, Autism Speaks, an autism advocacy organization in the United States that sponsors autism research and conducts awareness and outreach activities aimed at families, governments, and the public.

== Personal life ==
Arrarás currently lives in Miami with her three children, Julian Enrique, Lara Giuliana, and Adrian Vadim.

Since 2022 was in a relationship with the businessman, Raúl Quintero, and on May 3, 2024, Arrarás announced the death of her partner, due to a sudden heart attack.

== See also ==
- List of Puerto Ricans
- List of television presenters
- History of women in Puerto Rico
