= 2007 MacArthur Park rallies =

Immigration policy protests in Los Angeles, California, US

- Date: May 1, 2007
- Location: MacArthur Park, Los Angeles, California
- Caused by: Police attempt to disperse rally

Parties
Protestors	Los Angeles Police Department

Casualties and losses
33 injured 5 arrests	7 injured
- 9 journalists injured

The 2007 MacArthur Park rallies, also known as the May Day Melee, were two May Day rallies demanding amnesty for illegal immigrants which occurred on May 1, 2007, at MacArthur Park, in Los Angeles.

When the protest overflowed onto city streets, police drove motorcycles through the crowd, then ordered the crowd to disperse. Some people began throwing plastic bottles and rocks at officers. Members of the Los Angeles Police Department then used batons and rubber bullets in a manner later found by the LAPD's own investigation, as well as by the courts, to be excessive. After community mobilization, pressure from the Mayor, and an extensive internal review, LAPD Chief William Bratton apologized, the commanding officer was demoted, 17 other officers faced penalties, and the LAPD paid more than $13 million in damages.

== Incident ==
Organizers obtained the necessary permits to hold a rally at MacArthur Park on May 1, 2007 until 21:00. At about 17:15 a few protesters began blocking the street, which the rally permit expressly prohibited. The police made numerous requests for the protesters to move from the street and abide by the conditions of the permit. The protesters defied the police requests and began gathering in larger numbers on the street. When the attempts by police to move the crowd failed, police commanders declared the gathering an unlawful assembly. The formal order for the crowd to disperse was given in English, being broadcast from a police helicopter circling the park, from police cars, and from hand-held megaphones. A significant portion of the crowd, many who spoke and understood only Spanish, ignored this order and did not disperse. Police officers formed a line and advanced slowly to clear the area. The officers proceeded about 50 feet at a time, allowing those complying with the dispersal order to retreat. Most protesters left the area at this point, however, some that had stayed began to throw rocks and bottles at the advancing officers.

Altogether, the estimated 600 police officers fired 146 foam-rubber projectiles. 33 marchers and 9 journalists were injured. One woman reported suffering a miscarriage after injury by the police. Five people were arrested. Seven police officers were injured.

The incident received considerable attention from news media because several reporters were also pushed and injured, notably Christina Gonzalez from L.A.'s Fox 11 News (KTTV), and Telemundo's National Evening Broadcaster, Pedro Sevcec. CBS 2/KCAL 9 (KCBS-TV, KCAL-TV) reporter Mark Coogan and his cameraman Carl Stein were also accosted. Stein was struck on the ribs by LAPD batons. Patricia Nazario, a reporter for KPCC, was beaten in the ribs and back, before being struck over the head with a baton. ABC 7 (KABC-TV) reporter Sid Garcia was hit by a rubber bullet, but it ricocheted off him. Patti Ballaz, a camerawoman for KTTV who was injured, filed a claim for unspecified damages against the city and the police department.

== Response by government officials ==
At a press conference later in the day, Police Chief William J. Bratton indicated that an investigation was underway to "determine if the use of force was appropriate," going on to state that "the vast majority of people who were [at MacArthur Park] were behaving appropriately." Bratton indicated he may ask the FBI to investigate the chain of events.

At the time of the events, Los Angeles Mayor Antonio Villaraigosa was on a trip to El Salvador. He cut his trip short three days later, in order to personally oversee the investigation of the chain of events, and asked Police Chief Bratton to oversee a "complete and comprehensive review of this incident, including deployment, tactics, and use of force." At a Sunday morning mass at Cathedral of Our Lady of the Angels on May 6, Villaraigosa said "I come today with a heavy heart ... Nobody, nobody should be victimized in a way we saw women, children and families victimized just a few days ago."

Los Angeles city council member Herb Wesson, whose district includes neighborhoods near MacArthur Park, criticized the police response by comparing it to beating of civil rights leaders in the South in the 1960s. He praised Bratton's response, though, saying "I'm proud that the chief said quickly that some inappropriate actions took place." Fabian Núñez, Speaker of the California Assembly whose district includes MacArthur Park where the events took place, condemned the actions of the police by saying "To say we are outraged is an understatement ... We want those responsible in the highest levels of the LAPD to pay consequences." Robert Baker, president of the Police union, responded, calling Wesson's and Núñez's words "police bashing that erroneously insinuates racial bias".

== Investigations ==
Four separate investigations were created to investigate the incident, one of them being a special task force set up by city council president Eric Garcetti. The task force is composed of five councilmembers, and is co-chaired by Los Angeles city councilmembers Ed Reyes and Jack Weiss. The FBI also investigated the incidents for civil rights violations.

On May 17, the American Civil Liberties Union filed a request with U.S. District Judge Gary A. Feess to look into whether the incident at MacArthur Park violated a 2001 consent decree which was a result of the Rampart scandal. If the judge finds the LAPD in violation of the decree, federal oversight of the LAPD could be extended beyond the current deadline of 2009.

On May 29, Chief Bratton presented preliminary findings of an internal police investigation to the civilian police commission, and on May 30 he presented the preliminary findings to the Los Angeles City Council. According to Bratton, the main reasons for the mêlée were "a command and control breakdown," [which] began at the planning stages and dominoed throughout the event itself".

On October 9, five months after the incident, the LAPD released the results of an internal investigation.

== Community response ==
On May 17, approximately 2,000 to 3,000 people marched in protest of the events that took place on May 1. The march started at a church 10 blocks west of MacArthur Park with a "town hall meeting", and ended at MacArthur Park. The march was peaceful, without a single arrest, and the town hall meeting featured speakers such as Mayor Antonio Villaraigosa and Assembly Speaker Fabian Núñez, who later marched with the protesters. Police Chief William Bratton was also present at the march and town hall meeting.

== Fallout ==
On May 7, 2007, Chief William J. Bratton announced a departmental reorganization. Cayler "Lee" Carter, who was a deputy chief and the highest-ranking official at scene, was demoted to commander and assigned home duty. On May 17, Carter announced his resignation from the LAPD, effective June 6. In his May 7 announcement, Bratton also announced that Carter's deputy, Louis Gray, would be reassigned to the operations bureau, and that about 60 officers who were involved in the incident would be taken off the street, pending the outcome of the investigations.

On May 9, the Multi-Ethnic Immigrant Workers Organizing Network filed a class-action suit against the Los Angeles Police Department and the city. In February 2009, the City Council approved a $12.85 million to settle nine lawsuits against the city.

On May 30, Bratton announced the creation of a new Incident Management & Training Bureau, and assigned Deputy Chief Michael Hillmann to head the newly created bureau.

Over a year later, on July 8, 2008, the LAPD announced "that 17 officers and two sergeants from the department's elite Metropolitan Division should be punished for their roles in [the incident]". The recommended punishment was not publicized, and could range from a simple reprimand to termination. Critics decried the announcement, saying that only officers "whose actions were captured on video" were recommended for punishment. Chief William Bratton asked for four officers to be dismissed, however no officers were fired.
