= Ocurrió Así =

- Genre: News magazine
- Created by: Fran Mires
- Presented by: Enrique Gratas (1990–1999); Pedro Sevcec (1999); Ana Patricia Candiani (2000–2002); Candela Ferro (2001–2002)
- Country of origin: United States
- Original language: Spanish

Production
- Running time: 60 minutes

Original release
- Network: Telemundo
- Release: October 8, 1990 – April 26, 2002

Related
- Al Rojo Vivo

Ocurrió así (Spanish: It Happened Like So) is Spanish-language network Telemundo's first original investigative news magazine that launched on October 8, 1990, to April 26, 2002. The show was originally hosted by Enrique Gratas from 1990 until he left the network in 1999. Pedro Sevcec, a previous reporter for the show, returned as a temporary host that year. The show was later re-launched in 2000 with Ana Patricia Candiani hosting. Candela Ferro joined the program in 2001, and both remained until its cancellation in 2002, when it was replaced by Al Rojo Vivo.

== Broadcast history ==
The original Ocurrió Así logo.

Ocurrió Así premiered on October 8, 1990, with Enrique Gratas as host, airing in the 5:00 p.m. timeslot. It became an instant hit, winning six Emmy Awards, and becoming the leading program for the network. Ratings, however, gradually started to slip due in part to facing competition from rival network Univision's Primer Impacto in the same timeslot. Gratas left the show in 1999, and Pedro Sevcec took over as host for the remainder of the year. When Sevcec got promoted to main anchor of Noticiero Telemundo in January 2000, Ana Patricia Candiani became the new host of Ocurrió Así, with Candela Ferro joining as co-host in 2001. These changes did not improve the show's ratings, and Ocurrió Así went off the air in 2002. The program was replaced by Al Rojo Vivo, hosted by former Primer Impacto anchor Maria Celeste Arraras.

== Incidents ==
One of the more infamous moments in Ocurrió así was the 1993 murder of Maritza Martin, which occurred on January 18, and was caught on camera. Originally, the segment was to be an interview in a graveyard where Emilio Núñez was visiting his deceased daughter. He blamed her suicide on Martin following an intense dispute on Thanksgiving of 1992. During the interview, Martin unexpectedly arrived to visit her daughter's grave. Upon facing Maritza, Núñez headed back to his car; as the interviewer tried to question Maritza, Núñez suddenly reappeared with a gun and shot Martin 12 times, killing her. The murder would later be used in the 2002 documentary Bowling for Columbine.
