= Murder of Maritza Martin =

1993 murder in North Lauderdale, Florida, US

Coordinates: 26°12′30″N 80°12′09″W

- A video of Maritza Martin moments before she was shot to death.
- Location: North Lauderdale, Florida, U.S.
- Date: January 18, 1993
- Attack type: Murder by shooting
- Victim: Maritza Martin
- Perpetrator: Emilio Nuñez
- Charges: First-degree murder Unlawful flight to avoid prosecution
- Verdict: Guilty
- Judge: Daniel True Andrews

On January 18, 1993, Maritza Martin Munoz, a 33-year-old Cuban-American woman, was shot to death by her 34-year-old ex-husband, Emilio Nuñez, at Our Lady Queen of Heaven Cemetery in North Lauderdale, Florida, United States. Nuñez had been interviewed by Ocurrió Así television reporter Ingrid Cruz, who accompanied him when he visited his daughter's grave. While the crew was filming Nuñez at the cemetery, Martin arrived for her visit, and Cruz confronted Martin, who was sitting silently in her vehicle, insisting that Martin answer her questions. Martin and Nuñez's 15-year-old daughter, Yoandra, had committed suicide in November 1992 following their discovery of her being 13 weeks pregnant, and Nuñez had blamed the incident on Martin. Nuñez believed that their daughter had been abused by her stepfather and murdered or driven to suicide by her mother. Investigators rejected both theories. Martin had raised Yoandra; Nuñez was prevented from having contact with her.

As Cruz continued banging on Martin's car window, trying to get her to answer questions, Nuñez left the grave site and returned to his vehicle. Martin then left her car, noted Nuñez's license plate number, and turned towards the grave, while ignoring Cruz's questions. As Martin started silently walking towards the grave with Cruz still asking questions, Nuñez suddenly returned with a 9mm semi-automatic pistol, shot Martin in the back of the head, then shot her several more times after she fell to the ground. The cameraman filmed the shots while Cruz started screaming and ran towards the station vehicle. The footage was used in the 1993 shockumentary film Traces of Death. It was also shown in the 2002 documentary film Bowling for Columbine.

Martin left behind an eighteen-month-old son. She was buried next to her daughter.

In 2000, Nuñez was found guilty by a Fort Lauderdale, Florida jury. He was sentenced to life imprisonment with the possibility of parole after serving 25 years.

== See also ==
- Murders of Alison Parker and Adam Ward
