= Al Rojo Vivo (2002 TV program) =

American Spanish-language television news program

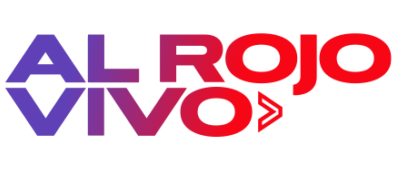
- Presented by: María Celeste Arrarás; Jessica Carrillo; Lourdes Stephen
- Country of origin: United States
- Original language: Spanish

Production
- Running time: 1 hour
- Production company: Noticias Telemundo

Original release
- Network: Telemundo
- Release: April 29, 2002 – present

Related
- Ocurrió Así

Al Rojo Vivo (Red Hot) is a Spanish language news program on the American television network Telemundo, which has been broadcast on that network since 2002, replacing the long-running Ocurrió Así. The name derives from the Spanish language expression meaning heated until red hot, the glowing color of an object between about 500 °C and 800 °C. As in English, it can be used to indicate intense emotion or a situation ready to be shaped or forged by public opinion.

The show is very similar to its Univision competitor, Primer Impacto, featuring a mix of tabloid and entertainment news, sports, weather, and human interest stories. The show has a tamer and less aggressive approach compared to its competitor, however, with less coverage of crime stories and more lighter fare.

The show was hosted by María Celeste Arrarás from its inception, just after resigning from Primer Impacto and giving birth to her first baby. She was the main face of the show until August 5, 2020, when she was laid off as part of cost-cutting measures by Telemundo's parent company NBCUniversal. After an interim period in which Arrarás' main fill-ins up to that time, Myrka Dellanos and correspondents Rodner Figueroa, Rebeka Smyth and Jessica Carrillo, anchored the broadcast on rotation, the show switched to a dual presentation on October 26, 2020, with Carrillo promoted as co-anchor with newcomer Antonio Texeira, brought over from Telemundo O&O KBLR in Las Vegas. The new presenting team was poorly received upon launch, critics opining that it was too similar to its competitor, and lacked the flair of Arrarás.
