= Hoy Día =

Spanish language television morning show

- Genre: Morning show
- Presented by: Penélope Menchaca; Lissette "Chiky BomBom" Eduardo; Carlos Calderon; Clovis Nienow
- Country of origin: United States
- Original language: Spanish

Production
- Production locations: Miami, Florida
- Running time: 180 minutes (with commercials)
- Production company: Noticias Telemundo

Original release
- Network: Telemundo
- Release: February 15, 2021 – present

Hoy Día (Today) is an American Spanish-language morning television show broadcast by Telemundo. The show is broadcast from Telemundo Center in Miami, and is hosted by Penélope Menchaca, Lisette Eduardo, and Carlos Calderon, Clovis Nienow, and Pancho Uresti as guest presenter.

The series premiered on February 15, 2021, replacing Telemundo's previous morning show Un Nuevo Día. It was initially produced by Noticias Telemundo and had a format closer to English-language morning shows such as NBC's Today, with a mix of hard news and lifestyle content (as opposed to competitors such as Univision's Despierta América, which typically focus on entertainment and tabloid-based content).

In November 2022, Telemundo moved the program to its entertainment division; after a hiatus for the 2022 FIFA World Cup, the show was relaunched in December 2022 with an entertainment-driven format similar to its predecessor.

== History ==
In January 2021, Telemundo announced that it would replace its existing morning show Un Nuevo Día with a new program, Hoy Día, beginning February 15, 2021.

The new program would be hosted by former Noticias Univision anchor Arantxa Loizaga, Nacho Lozano (coming from Imagen Television in Mexico), and Noticias Telemundo correspondent Nicole Suárez. The first half of the program carried a focus on news headlines and discussion, with weather segments provided by meteorologist Carlos Robles (coming from KTMD in Houston, Texas), while the second half was oriented more towards lifestyle and entertainment topics, which were hosted by Adamari López and Stephanie Himonidis (who continued from Un Nuevo Día).

Loizaga stated that Hoy Día would be comparable to Today—its English-language equivalent on NBC, and explained that the program would carry a stronger focus on hard news rather than entertainment news and tabloid content. She believed that amid ongoing events impacting the Latino community (such as the COVID-19 pandemic), viewers needed the information that would allow them to "make the right decisions for themselves and their families."

=== 2022 revamp ===
On November 18, 2022, Hoy Día went on hiatus for Telemundo Deportes coverage of the 2022 FIFA World Cup. During the hiatus, Telemundo laid off or reassigned nearly all of Hoy Día's on-air talent (aside from López). This came amid the transfer of the program from Noticias Telemundo to the network's entertainment division, which would reposition it with a "variety, news and entertainment format".

On November 30, 2022, Telemundo announced that Hoy Día would be relaunched with its new format on December 5, 2022, with López joined as host by Penelope Menchaca, Lissette "Chiky Bombom" Eduardo, Miss Universe 2020 winner Andrea Meza, and rotating guest panelists. After featuring guests hosts for over a month, it was announced on January 24, 2023, that actor Daniel Arenas would be joining the show as a permanent co-host. Arenas officially joined the program on January 25, 2023. On April 6, 2023, it was announced that Adamari López would be leaving the show after 11 years on the network. López was the last holdout from the shows previous eras as she was one of the original hosts of Un Nuevo Dia and the only one to not leave the show after the 2022 revamp. On a written statement Telemundo reiterated this was a mutual decision taken between López and the network and that they were grateful at López's dedication to her role in Telemundo. As of October 10, 2023, Danilo Carrera joined the morning show as presenter alongside Menchaca, Meza, Eduardo and Arenas. In 2024, Carlos Calderon joined as co-host, while Daniel Arenas decided to exit the show to focus on other projects.

== Hoy Día Puerto Rico ==
Hoy Día
- Title card
- Also known as: Hoy Día Puerto Rico
- Genre: News program
- Presented by: Ivonne Orsini; Grenda Rivera; Pamela Noa; Jasond Calderon; Gianluca Perotti; Roberto Cortes
- Country of origin: Puerto Rico
- Original language: Spanish

Production
- Executive producer: Dialma Santiago
- Production locations: Studio 7 and 8 at Telemundo de Puerto Rico, San Juan, Puerto Rico
- Camera setup: Multi-camera
- Running time: 180 Minutes

Original release
- Network: Telemundo Puerto Rico
- Release: February 15, 2021 – present

In December 2020, Telemundo's Puerto Rico station WKAQ-TV announced that it would launch a new local morning show in February 2021. On January 5, 2021, it was announced that Ivonne Orsini and Ramon "Gato" Gomez, who at the time worked with rival station WAPA, would be jumping to Telemundo to host the morning show. On January 13, 2021, it was announced that Orisini and Gomez would also be joined by former Senator and WAPA reporter Zoe Laboy as a political reporter.

On January 19, 2021, it was announced that the new program would be branded as Hoy Dia Puerto Rico — a local version of Telemundo's then-forthcoming relaunch of its morning show in the mainland, and that weekend anchor Grenda Rivera and meteorologist Elizabeth Robaina would also be joining the show to host a news segment and a weather/traffic segment respectively. It was stated that the program would have a magazine style format, and air weekdays from 8:00 a.m. to 10:00 a.m. 5 months after the show premiered, WKAQ-TV promoted Robaina to the early evening newscasts, with WKAQ chief meteorologist Roberto Cortez moving to Hoy Dìa. During its 2023 Upfront presentation, WKAQ-TV announced that Douglas Candelario will be joining Hoy Día Puerto Rico. Candelario worked for over a decade with rival station WAPA-TV where he reached popularity with his DIY/Home Gardening segments during their morning newscast. He'll bring those DIY, Home and Gardening projects to his segment Cosas de Douglas (Douglas' Things) which will air on the show every Monday, Wednesday and Friday at the 8:30am hour starting December 12, 2022.

On January 13, 2023 it was announced on air that local radio host Jacky Fontánez would be joining Hoy Día Puerto Rico as a host. Fontánez had been guest hosting the show for a week before the announcement was made that she would be joining full time. With Fontánez's arrival the show debuted a new segment called Mi Punto de Vista (My Point of View) where Fontánez joins co-host Ivonne Orsini, news anchor Grenda Rivera and a guest in discussing hot topics.

On February 3, 2023, nearly 2 years after the premiere of the show, it was announced that Ramon "Gato" Gómez would be leaving Hoy Día Puerto Rico as he prepared to join WKAQ's coverage of the 2023 BSN Basketball Tournament. Gómez, a former BSN player himself, informed the audience of his exit as WKAQ announced they now have the exclusive broadcast rights of every BSN game and that Gómez would be part of those broadcasts. Jacky Fontánez and Ivonne Orsini will continue as hosts of the show moving forward. On February 21, 2023, it was announced that radio-host and internet personality, Pamela Noa would also be joining the show as a host.

On January 8, 2024, two new talents joined the show as hosts. Carlos McConnie and Jasond Calderón (who's also a cast member on the station's comedy show Raymond y sus Amigos) would now join Orsini, Fontánez and Noa as hosts of the show moving forward. The show also announced it would expand its run time later in the year adding a new hour of the show from 10:00 a.m. to 11:00 a.m.. The extra hour will be called Hoy Día Puerto Rico: 10 a.m. and it will have a different set of hosts from the original 8-10 a.m. version of the show.

On January 2026, it was announced that Carlos McConnie and Jacky Fontanez would be leaving the program. It was also announced that Chef Marylin would also not be part of the show moving forward. The exits were attributed to budget cuts within the show's production.

On June 11, 2026, the show expanded to three hours, now running from 8:00 a.m.-11:00 a.m. and serving as a lead in to the 11:00 a.m. broadcast of Telenoticias.

=== Notable current on-air staff ===
- Ivonne Orsini - Host
- Pamela Noa - Host
- Jasond Calderón - Host
- Gianluca Perotti - Host
- Grenda Rivera - News Anchor
- Roberto Cortes - Chief Meteorologist
- Desiree Lowry - Beauty Correspondent
- Suzette Baco - Lifestyle Guru
- Peter Hornedo - Borinqueando el Fin de Semana
- Juan Carlos Pedreira - Zona Digital
- Dayana Perozo - Nutritionist
- Dr. Guillermo Colón

=== Former on-air staff ===
- Zoe Laboy - Political Analyst (now at TeleOnce)
- Jacky Fontánez - Host (now at Día a Día con Raymond y Dagmar)
- Ramón "Gato" Gomez - Host
- Carlos McConnie - Host
- Chef Marylin - Sazón Del Día
- Douglas Candelario - Las Cosas de Douglas (now at WAPA-TV)
