= Pedro Sevcec =

Uruguayan television personality and journalist

- Born: Pedro Ricardo Sevcec; July 14, 1954 (age 71); Montevideo, Uruguay
- Occupation(s): Television personality, journalist
- Years active: 1976–present
- Spouse: Raquelin Gonzalez (1997–present)

Pedro Ricardo Sevcec (born July 14, 1954) is a Uruguayan television personality and journalist best known as the former anchor of Noticiero Telemundo in the United States, from 2000 to 2009. Sevcec previously served as reporter for Ocurrio Asi before hosting his own talk show on the network. He currently hosts Sevcec on MegaTV since 2021 and has his own afternoon drive radio show on WSUA Miami- Radio Caracol 1260 AM called La Ventana con Pedro Sevcec.

== Early career ==
Upon arriving to the United States, Sevcec started working as a correspondent for Spanish International Network. In 1986, Sevcec switched over to Telemundo, where he served as journalist and reporter for its network news. Sevcec served as co-anchor and reporter for Ocurrio Asi in 1993, alongside Enrique Gratas. He later hosted his own talk show, Sevcec which ran from 1994 to 1999, when it was replaced by Laura en America. Sevcec returned to Ocurrió Así as host for a brief period in 1999 after its original host Enrique Gratas left Telemundo that year.

== Noticiero Telemundo ==
In 2000, Sevcec became the main anchor for Noticiero Telemundo, where he remained for the next nine years. During this time, he interviewed numerous presidents and world leaders, including then-president George W. Bush. In September 2001, he and Brit Hume of Fox News Channel were the only two journalists to attend President Bush's first state dinner.

=== Incidents ===
On February 17, 2004, a bomb exploded in an Iraqi school where Sevcec was filming a report about the opening of the school, with no one being injured. He also survived a shooting between guerrillas and the military in El Salvador years before.

Sevcec was involved in the Los Angeles May Day Mêlée that took part on May 1, 2007. In video footage of the incident, Sevcec is seen running away from oncoming police officers just as his evening live broadcast was taking place. In an interview, he recounted how police were hitting women and children as they were running away.

=== Departure from Telemundo ===
On December 16, 2009, Telemundo announced that Pedro Sevcec was being replaced as anchor of the Noticiero Telemundo nightly newscast with Jose Diaz-Balart, a veteran anchor and reporter. The Miami Herald reported that Telemundo was replacing Sevcec as "part of a big new push at Telemundo toward news integration -- not just between shows, but between the network's broadcast, cable and digital operations as well."

In 2011, Sevcec joined WJAN-CD América Teve 41 and began hosting Sevcec A Fondo, until his 2021 departure and currently presents "Sevcec" on WSBS-TV Channel 22 and syndicated nationally via MegaTV.
