= Myrka Dellanos =

American entertainer

- Born: Myrka Bárbara Dellanos; May 27, 1965 (age 61); Havana, Cuba
- Occupations: Television and radio host, journalist, author, socialite
- Spouses: Alejandro Loynáz (m. 1991; div. 1998) David Matthews (m. 2000; div. 2002) Ulyses Daniel Alonso (m. 2008; div. 2009)
- Partner: Luis Miguel (2003–2005)
- Children: 1 (Alexa, with Loynáz)

Myrka Bárbara Dellanos (born May 27, 1965) is a Cuban-American television and radio host, journalist, and author.

== Education and career ==
Born in Philadelphia, Pennsylvania, on May 27, 1965, Dellanos graduated from the University of Miami with a bachelor's degree in journalism in 1986. Myrka got her first break in 1992 when she co-hosted the popular Univision news program Primer Impacto (First Impact). Dellanos would continue to serve as co-host of Primer Impacto until 2004 when she was chosen as the "Star of the Year" by readers of the magazine People en Español. Dellanos also served as the host of the celebrations of Hispanic Heritage Month at the White House in Washington, DC., and she was appointed by U.S. President George W. Bush as a member of the Freedom Corps, a group consisting of 25 people who work together to promote charitable giving. Later, Dellanos turned towards social service and other humanitarian causes, such as providing help for orphaned children and for victims of domestic abuse.

She was named in 2013 spokesperson for "I Am Second", a movement meant to provide spiritual inspiration and hope to individuals dealing with various life issues, such as abortion, divorce, and child abuse. Myrka has won the Hispanic Leadership Award by the Hispanic Heritage Council: she was named in 2003 as "Person of the Year" by the Organization of Ibero-American Journalists; Myrka was named in 2001 as the Hispanic of the Year by Direct Marketing Association of America: she was also chosen as a Goodwill Ambassador for the International Rescue Committee, which is part of the United Nations and helps rescuing refugees; Dellanos, after an 8-year absence from broadcast journalism, returned in 2013 to television as host and contributor for American-based Hispanic network Estrella TV and its news-magazine En la Mira with Enrique Gratas. Dellanos has authored several books, including Succeed and Be Happy: Things I Learned Thanks to God, My Mom, and Life. March 2022 began cohosting "La Mesa Caliente" on Telemundo, a round table show similar to "The View".

In 2023, she was a guest judge of the 71st edition of Miss Universe, held at the New Orleans Morial Convention Center in New Orleans, Louisiana, United States.

== Personal life ==
In 1991, Dellanos married Dr. Alejandro Loynáz: on 30 December 1993, she gave birth to the couple's only daughter, Alexa. When their daughter was 4 years old, Dellanos and Loynáz divorced in 1998. Dellanos married David Matthews in 2000, but they were divorced in 2002; Dellanos started a highly publicized relationship in 2003 with Mexican singer Luis Miguel, whom she was previously engaged to before ending their story in June 2005.

Dellanos on 8 April 2008 married a Cuban-born pharmaceutical representative, Ulyses Daniel Alonso, at a private ceremony in Coral Gables, Florida: this couple later appeared on the 2 July 2008 cover of the magazine People en Español. On 25 August 2008, Alonso was arrested and charged with domestic battery. The following day a police report was released that detailed the events leading to his arrest. On 29 August 2008, the CGPD - Coral Gables Police Department - released audio of the 9-1-1 call made by Dellanos. On 18 March 2009, she and Alonso filed for divorce, citing irreconcilable differences.
