= Candela Ferro =

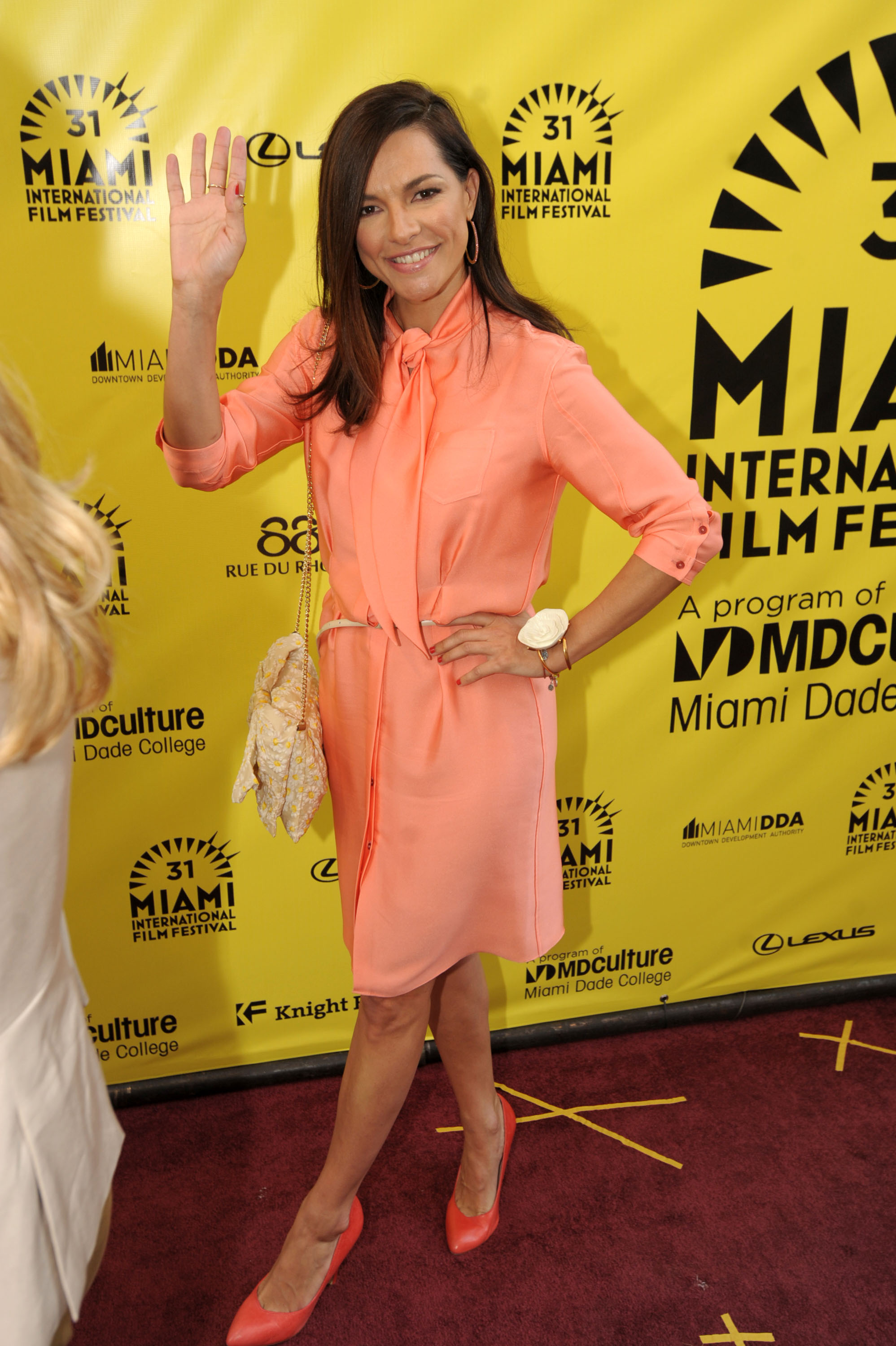
- Ferro at the 2014 Miami International Film Festival
- Born: Candela Ferro; November 13, 1973 (age 51); Reconquista, Argentina
- Occupation(s): Host, Journalist, TV Personality

Candela Ferro (born November 13, 1973, in Reconquista, Argentina) is an Argentine journalist, model, and host of Telemundo's Al Rojo Vivo: Fin de Semana con Candela Ferro and the E! Latin show Mil Preguntas, Una Estrella con Candela Ferro (1,000 Questions, 1 Star).

== Biography ==
=== Early life ===
At an early age she realized she loved entertaining people, she would mimic Libertad Lamarque, a famous Argentine tango vocalist, and she would passionately recite poems by García Lorca, her favorite writer and one of the most influential Spanish writers of all time.

She studied Communications at the University of Buenos Aires, thinking that she would be able to showcase her many talents through this career. At age 18, she began working in a local TV show called Domingo Total (Total Sunday), which was broadcast live every weekend. She also worked as an entertainment reporter for the show De Boca en Boca (From Mouth to Mouth) at ATC Television. For two years she anchored a show focused on women’s issues, current events and celebrity interviews on ‘Utilísima Satelital,’ also in Argentina.

=== Career ===
In 2001, Ferro traveled to the United States with the aspiration of becoming a journalist and a TV presenter. And in the year 2001, Candela’s life took a spectacular turn for the best, when she was approached by Telemundo to work as a writer, producer and presenter for the network. Since joining Telemundo, now part of the NBC family, Candela has had the honor of hosting the Latin Billboard Music Awards in 2001, 2004, 2005 and 2006, an event that is watched by millions of viewers throughout the world. She hosted for 4 consecutive years the Macy's Thanksgiving Day Parade for Telemundo (simulcast by NBC) and the Miss Universe Pageant from Panama in 2003, from Ecuador in 2004, Thailand in 2005, Los Angeles in 2006, from Mexico in 2007, from Vietnam in 2008, from Bahamas in 2009 and Las Vegas in 2010.

In 2002, Candela presented the INTE Awards (Spanish Television Industry Awards) in Miami, the Golden Globe Awards in Spanish and the Red Carpet pre-show to the Tribute to Celia Cruz.

In 2003, she was nominated as Best Female Presenter of the Year in the INTE Awards. In 2004, she hosted the Hispanic Heritage Awards and has been the host of Premio de la Gente in Los Angeles three times. In 2005 she hosted the live special of the Wedding of Charles and Camilla for E! Entertainment Latin America. As part as her collaborations with the cable network, she recently interviewed Ricky Martin in the special entitled “Ricky Martin en Candela.”

In 2007 and 2008, Candela was the host of the new weekend edition of Telemundo's Al Rojo Vivo called Al Rojo Vivo: Fin de Semana con Candela Ferro.

The Argentinean journalist interviewed Brad Pitt and Cate Blanchett in an exclusive one and one for Warner Channel Latin America, for the premiere of the movie "The Curious Case of Benjamin Button".

In 2006 Candela joined E! Entertainment Latin America, for her own show Mil Preguntas Una Estrella Con Candela Ferro, a cycle of interviews that would reveal her as one of the best interviewers, sage and curious of the television in Spanish market, sharing an hour of conversations with Penélope Cruz, Jennifer López, Javier Bardem, Ricky Martin, Thalía, Paulina Rubio, Gloria Trevi, Daddy Yankee, Enrique Iglesias, Belinda, Alejandro Fernández and Alejandra Guzmán.

== Television ==
Telemundo Network | News Anchor| TV Presenter Miami, FL | (2001-2011) Hosted multiple live events and anchored “Ocurrio Así “ (2001-2003) "Al Rojo Vivo con Candela Ferro." (2007-2008) Ridley’s Aunque Usted No Lo Crea “ (2003-2006) “Decisiones “ (2006-2008)

E! Entertainment Television | TV Host Miami, FL | (2003 - 2009) Interviewed celebrities and artist around the world.

Univision Online Web Series | TV Host

- TREsemmé, Miami, FL

(2013 - 2014)

Fox Telecolombia | TV Host Colombia | (2013) Hosted reality tv show "Cocineros Al Límite."

Mega TV | TV Presenter Miami, FL | 2012-2013) Anchored news magazine "Las Tres Caras de la Moneda."

Warner Bros | TV Host Miami, FL | (2010-2012) Covered special events worldwide and interviewed celebrities for movies premieres.

Discovery | TV Host Miami, FL | (2011- 2012) Hosted special events, including interviews with Carolina Herrera and "Sex and The City" cast.
