= Carey McWilliams (marksman) =

American outdoorsman and novelist

- Born: Fargo, North Dakota, U.S.
- Occupations: Author; Outdoorsman; Firearms Safety Consultant for the Blind
- Spouse: Victoria McWilliams (m. 2004)

Carey McWilliams is an American author, outdoorsman and firearms safety consultant. He gained prominence in 2001, when he became the first blind person to acquire a concealed weapons permit to allow him to carry a firearm for self-defense.

== Life ==
McWilliams was born the son of Janice McWilliams. His blindness, caused by a late-blooming birth defect that failed to appear at birth, occurred at age ten. Despite complete blindness, at age 14, McWilliams joined the Civil Air Patrol, where he had the opportunity to co-pilot many small aircraft. It was through the cadet program that he learned to disassemble, clean, reassemble and fire his first gun, the M16.

After passing a pistol marksmanship course through the Army ROTC with a GPA of 4.0 at 18. At 27 he passed all shooting and written exams to receive his first concealed weapons permit from North Dakota in September 2000. In 2005, he became a figure in the National Gun Debate when he publicly opposed a move by his home state's legislature to remove the shooting portion of the CCW permit, stating that such allowed the carrying of loaded firearms by individuals who may have no knowledge of safe gun operation. Despite opposition from many sides of the gun issue, he has pursued other state's carry permits, obtaining CCW permits from Arizona, Florida, Utah and Virginia. In 2018, he passed all enhanced written and live-fire requirements to be issued a North Dakota enhanced class 1 concealed weapons permit, allowing him to carry a loaded firearm in 40 states with reciprocity.

In 2021, McWilliams obtained a permit to carry a loaded handgun from the state of Minnesota after two previous attempts in 2006 and again in 2016.

McWilliams married singer and minister Victoria Rice from Moorhead, Minnesota in 2004 in Germany. Rice has cerebral palsy.

== Bibliography ==
- Carey McWilliams: Moonlight's Meridian: Nuclear Terrorism And the Undead, Red Lead Books 2005 - ISBN 0-8059-8029-6
- Carey McWilliams: Guide Dogs and Guns: America's First Blind Marksman Fires Back, Airleaf Publishing 2007 - ISBN 978-1-60002-295-1

Republished: Washington, D.C.: National Library Service for the Blind and Physically Handicapped, Library of Congress, 2008.
Dewey No.: 362.41092 B ANF
Book Number: RC 65699 (2 sound cassettes (C-90): analog, 15/16 ips, 4 track, mono.
Book Number: DB 65699 (access: downloadable talking book)
http://hdl.loc.gov/loc.nls/db.65699

Carey McWilliams: A Shooting Guide for the Blind, Page Publishing 2018 - ISBN 9781642143225
