= Lana Montalban =

Argentine journalist

Lana Montalbán is an Argentine journalist, television anchor, and producer. Her career has spanned over thirty years across both the United States and Argentina, and she has been recognized with multiple awards for best anchorwoman.

== Career ==
Montalbán began her career in broadcast journalism in the United States, anchoring the national news for Telemundo HBC in 1987 and subsequently at WNJU (channel 47) in New York City until 1992. She then returned to her native Buenos Aires to anchor and produce Edición Plus, an investigative journalism program on the Telefé national network, which won the Martín Fierro Award for best news show in Argentina. Also on Telefé, she served as prime-time anchor, reporter, and producer for Panorama Internacional.

Montalbán subsequently anchored the prime-time nightly news on Channel 9 and Channel 7, both national networks in Argentina. She also worked as anchor, producer, and director for Perfiles Productions, and as a freelance correspondent and producer for Canal 13.

In the United States, Montalbán served as a correspondent for NBC News and as a freelance correspondent for CNN. She produced Historias Para Contar for Univision, on which she also served as a current events columnist for Despierta América. She anchored En Exclusivo and co-anchored Mundo Hola on Hola TV. She later anchored the talk show Pura Lana on Siempre Mujer Channel.

In addition to Spanish, her native language, Montalbán speaks fluent English, Portuguese, and Italian, as well as basic French. She currently lives in Miami, Florida.

== Books ==
Montalbán published an anthology of journalism in Spain entitled 101 Relatos del Periodismo. She also self-published Lullaby / Canción de Cuna, a bilingual children's book, with all proceeds donated to charities supporting children in Ukraine. The latter received an international award for children's literature.

== Awards ==
- Martín Fierro Award for best news show in Argentina, for Edición Plus
- International award for children's literature, for Lullaby / Canción de Cuna
