= Raul Peimbert =

Mexican-American newscaster (born 1962)

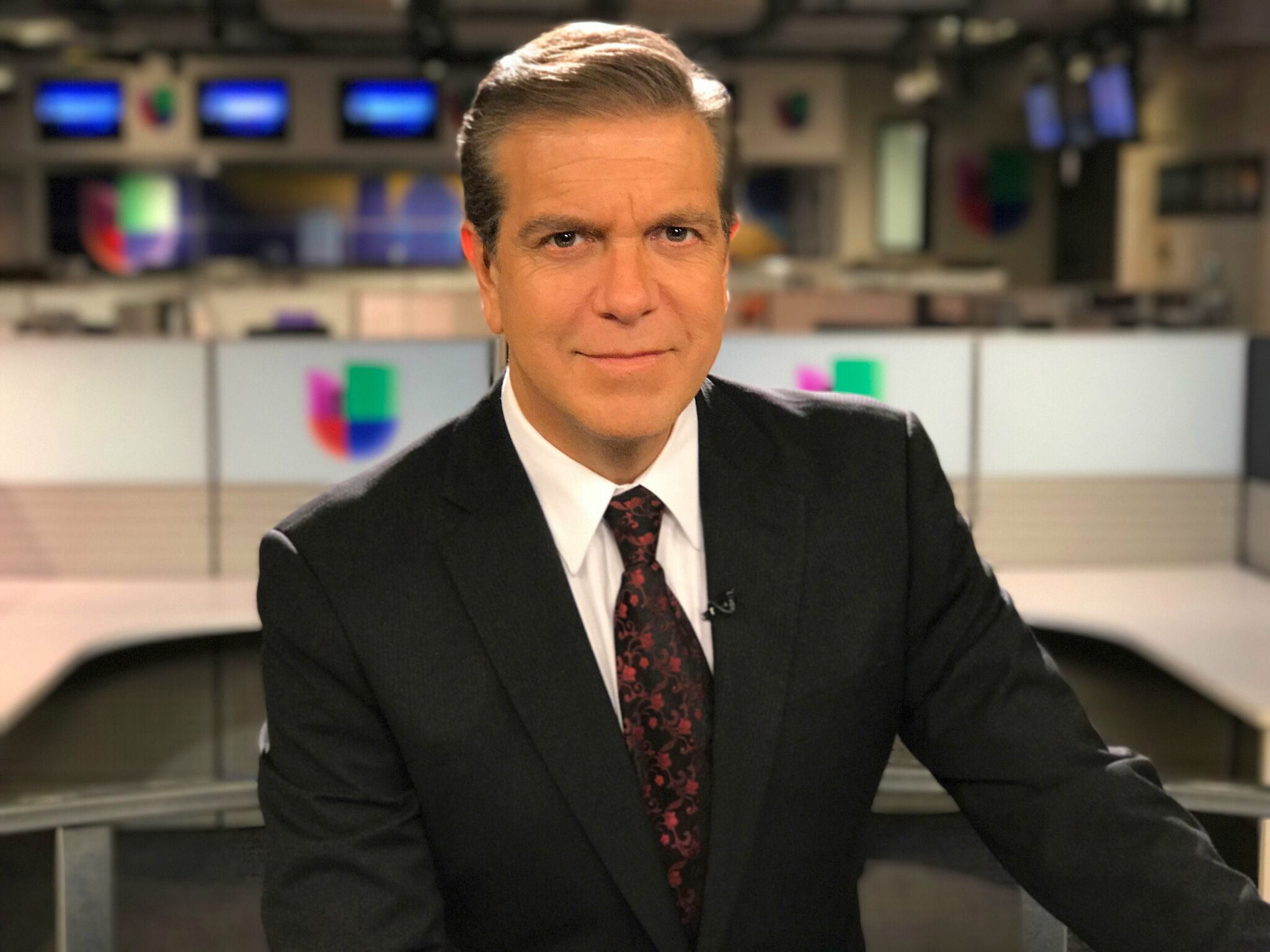
- Born: Raúl Peimbert Diaz; March 15, 1962 (age 64); Livermore, California, U.S.
- Occupations: News Anchor, Journalist, Editorialist

Raul Peimbert Diaz (born March 15, 1962) is a Mexican-American newscaster. He is the eldest son of Raul Peimbert Gaytan and Aura Diaz de Peimbert. Born in Livermore, California on March 15, 1962, he was raised in Mexico.

He got his start in television at a young age, as a news editor for a station in Guadalajara. He went on to anchor the news first in Xalapa, Ver., Mexico for Channel 4 (TV_MAS) later in the city of Veracruz, for the local Televisa Station.

In 1991 he began his career in Spanish-language television in the United States, first as co-anchor at Univision and later at Telemundo as main news anchor.

A few months later, along with the news show, he started a new program “América Habla con Raul Peimbert,” a one-on one interview show that has allowed him to be one of the few Hispanic journalists that has interviewed more than 40 Latin American presidents, among them: Felipe Calderon Hinojosa (Mexico), Vicente Fox Quesada (Mexico), Carlos Salinas de Gortari (Mexico), Ernesto Zedillo (Mexico), Carlos Saúl Menem (Argentina), Alberto Fujimori (Peru), César Gaviria (Colombia), Ernesto Samper (Colombia), Eduardo Frei (Chile), Ernesto Pérez Balladares (Panama), Armando Calderón Sol (El Salvador), Rafael Caldera (Venezuela), Jaime Paz Zamora (Bolivia), Gonzalo Sánchez de Lozada (Bolivia), Juan Carlos Wasmosy (Paraguay), Carlos Roberto Reina (Honduras), José López Portillo (Mexico), Miguel de la Madrid (Mexico), Joaquín Balaguer (Dominican Republic), Antonio Saca (El Salvador), Daniel Ortega (Nicaragua), Hugo Chávez (Venezuela), Leonel Fernández (Dominican Republic), Bill Clinton (United States).

His work goes beyond the boundaries of news; “America Habla” has allowed him to interview personalities such as Plácido Domingo, Rigoberta Menchú, Isabel Allende, Jacobo Zabludovsky, Carlos Fuentes, Joan Manuel Serrat, Elena Poniatowska, Mercedes Sosa, Oswaldo Guayasamín, José Luis Cuevas, Alberto Cortez, and Facundo Cabral.

Other special assignments include all the visits of Pope John Paul II to Latin America, the ongoing news coverage of the murdered presidential Mexican candidate, Luis Donaldo Colosio, the Los Angeles earthquake, the Federal Building explosion in Oklahoma, the terrorist attack on the twin towers in New York, the LA fires, the floods in the state of Tabasco, Mexico in 2007 and Hurricane Harvey in 2017, among others.

The National Academy of Television, Arts and Sciences has recognized Raul Peimbert with more than 35 nominations and 28 Emmy Awards.

Among many other awards and recognitions, he received the “Crystal Apple”, in New York, for his work with the Hispanic community.

That same year in Los Angeles, California, Richard Riordan, the mayor, declared Peimbert “Guest of Honor” and in Mexico he received “La Presea de la Libertad de Expresión”.

In 1995, the Hispanic Council of United States of America, bestowed the award of “Don Quijote” in recognition of his extraordinary labor in favor of the Hispanic culture and tradition.

In 1998, he joined Radio Unica, a Hispanic Radio Network, where he hosted “Muy Temprano”, with his wife Fulvia Peimbert.

He also presented the news for MVS Noticias in Mexico City and eventually became the news anchor at Telemundo in Los Angeles.

In 2002, he was hired as a General Coordinator of Media Affairs for the government of the State of Veracruz, Mexico. He gave up the position in 2004 after Miguel Alemán Velasco, the former governor, left the office.

From November 2005 to December 2011, Peimbert worked for Univision affiliate KMEX in Los Angeles as a primary anchor. In 2012 he took a lead anchor position at KXLN, Houston's Univision affiliate.

In 2007, the George Foster Peabody Awards has granted recognition to Raul Peimbert for his participation in "Ya Es Hora", a social campaign produced by Univision Communications.

Peimbert has been married to Fulvia Camargo Peimbert since 1986; they have a daughter, Alejandra Peimbert
