= Enrique Gratas =

Argentine journalist and television host

- Born: Enrique O. Gratas; November 25, 1944; Bahía Blanca, Buenos Aires, Argentina
- Died: October 8, 2015 (aged 70); Los Angeles, California, U.S.
- Occupations: Television personality, journalist
- Years active: 1966–2015

Enrique O. Gratas (born Gratás; November 25, 1944 – October 8, 2015) was an Argentine journalist and television personality known for being the original host of Ocurrió Así on Telemundo, and the former anchor of Univision's Última Hora (Last Hour), the second most popular Spanish newscast in the United States.

== Biography ==
Born in Bahía Blanca, Gratas started working in Argentina as a radio speaker in 1966 and moved to television news a year later. He moved to the United States in 1971 and worked as a correspondent for Argentine television.

Later he joined the sport division of KWHY-TV in Los Angeles. In 1978 he conducted the first Spanish-language sports program from KMEX-TV, also in Los Angeles. From 1982 to 1985 he was the news director of WXTV in New York City.

In 1989, he moved to Miami where Executive Producer Fran Mires brought him in to anchor Telemundo's flagship show, the network's first daily investigative news magazine Ocurrio asi ("It happened like this"). When Gratas left Telemundo Network in 1999, Pedro Sevcec took over the show temporarily before being replaced by Ana Patricia Candiani the following year.

In October 2000, Gratas launched Última Hora on Univision, which successfully continued to be aired for 10 years. Gratas was laid off in March 2009 along with 300 other Univision employees.

Together with Jorge Ramos and María Elena Salinas, they are considered amongst the most respected Spanish-language television journalists in the United States and Latin America.

Enrique Gratas last worked as the news anchor of Noticiero con Enrique Gratas on Estrella TV.

== Health issues and death ==
Late in September 2015, Gratas recorded a video message where he declared to the public that he had an undisclosed disease. On October 8, 2015, Gratas died in Los Angeles at age 70. The cause of death was cancer, according to the Chicago Tribune.

== Noted work ==
Among many others, Gratas interviewed:

- George W. Bush, Donald Rumsfeld and Colin Powell
- Jessica Lynch (first to interview her)
- Yolanda Saldívar (the person convicted for the murder of famous Tejano singer Selena Quintanilla)

He has also covered a number of major events, such as:

- Every American president since Richard Nixon
- Events from Watergate to the 9-11 attacks in New York City
- Numerous Democratic and Republican conventions
- Anchored coverage of the new Millennium for the Univision Network
- Both wars in Iraq
- Luis Colosio's assassination (1994)
- Olympic bombing in Atlanta (1996)
- 2000 U.S. presidential elections
- Several hurricanes
- The political crises in Argentina and Venezuela

== Recognitions ==
- 1996 Suncoast Regional Emmy Award
- Premio Paoli (Puerto Rico), for his commitment to journalism
- 1998 Señor Internacional
- Golden Globe nominee for best News Anchor
- 2005 City of Hope Cancer Center Award

== See also ==
- List of television reporters/Argentina
- List of television presenters/Argentina
