= List of television presenters =

A list of notable television presenters (British) or MCs (USA), (Latin America), by country of production:

== Albania ==
- Arian Demolli
- Leon Menkshi

== Argentina ==
- Mike Amigorena
- Mariana Anghileri
- Guillermo Arduino
- Lucho Avilés
- Thelma Biral
- Tato Bores
- Walter Bruno
- Nicolás Cabré
- Mónica Cahen D'Anvers
- Antonio Carrizo
- Moria Casan
- Claudia Ciardone
- Jésica Cirio
- Patricia Dal
- Nancy Dupláa
- Laura Natalia Esquivel
- Eduardo Feinmann
- Lourdes Cecilia Fernández
- Cacho Fontana
- Ricardo Forster
- Ricardo Fort
- Guillermo Francella
- Andrea Frigerio
- Catherine Fulop
- Ante Garmaz
- Antonio Gasalla
- Susana Giménez
- Sergio Goycochea
- Mariano Grondona
- Jorge Guinzburg
- Daniel Hadad
- Ruth Infarinato
- Guido Kaczka
- Ambar La Fox
- Jorge Lanata
- Héctor Larrea
- Raúl Lavié
- Mirtha Legrand
- Nelida Lobato
- Gianni Lunadei
- Valeria Lynch
- Isabel Macedo
- Lucía Maciel
- Jorge Marrale
- Duilio Marzio
- César Mascetti
- Tita Merello
- Juan Carlos Mesa
- Carlos Montero
- Norma Morandini
- Cris Morena
- Fernando Niembro
- Victoria Onetto
- Sebastián Ortega
- Horacio Pagani
- Mario Pergolini
- Reina Reech
- Nicolas Repetto
- Jorge Rial
- Calu Rivero
- Belén Rodríguez
- Juan Carlos Rousselot
- Sabrina Sabrok
- Donato De Santis
- Héctor Scotta
- Pedro Sevcec
- Gerardo Sofovich
- Soledad Solaro
- Adrián Suar
- Silvia Süller
- Marcelo Tinelli
- Daniel Viotto
- Romina Yan
- Jaime Yankelevich
- Fabio Zerpa

== Armenia ==
- Aida Nersissyan

== Australia ==
- John Burgess
- Martin Dougan (2019 only)
- Larry Emdur
- Tracy Grimshaw
- Jo Hall
- Peter Hitchener
- Sonia Kruger
- Rove McManus
- Darren McMullen
- George Negus
- Bert Newton
- Charli Robinson
- Naomi Robson
- Angela Tsun
- Ian Turpie

== Belgium ==
- Thomas Ancora
- Johan Anthierens
- Luc Appermont
- Siegfried Bracke
- Virginie de Clausade
- Tony Corsari
- Tom De Cock
- Ben Crabbé
- Maria Del Rio
- Claude Delacroix
- Mark Demesmaeker
- Bart De Pauw
- Virginie Efira
- Michel Follet
- Jonas Geirnaert
- Evi Hanssen
- Jean-Pierre Hautier
- Paule Herreman
- Ingeborg (singer)
- Bart Kaëll
- Kamagurka
- An Lemmens
- Jan Leyers
- Goedele Liekens
- Miel Louw
- Maureen Louys
- Nawell Madani
- Hugo Matthysen
- Jacques Mercier
- Karen Minier
- Helena Noguerra
- Bart Peeters
- Jo Röpcke
- Herr Seele
- Dré Steemans
- Mark Uytterhoeven
- Thomas Van Hamme
- Tom Van Landuyt
- Erik Van Looy
- Francesca Vanthielen
- Marcel Vanthilt
- André Vermeulen
- Johan Verstreken
- Koen Wauters
- Yasmine (singer)

== Brazil ==
- Camila Alves
- Angélica
- Sandra Annenberg
- Giovanna Antonelli
- Abelardo Barbosa
- Eliana
- Pedro Bial
- Caio Blinder
- Galvão Bueno
- Hebe Camargo
- Luigi Cani
- Scheila Carvalho
- Chacrinha
- Daniella Cicarelli
- Carolina Ferraz
- Aguinaldo Filho
- Amanda Françozo
- Adriane Galisteu
- Adriane Garcia
- Raul Gil
- Luciana Gimenez
- Márcia Goldschmidt
- Serginho Groisman
- Natália Guimarães
- Clodovil Hernandes
- Ana Hickmann
- Luciano Huck
- Carlos Eduardo Imperial
- João Inácio Junior
- João Kléber
- Glenda Kozlowski
- Fernanda Lima
- Cristina Lyra
- Luísa Mell
- Luisa Micheletti
- Marcos Mion
- Fernanda Motta
- Luciano Leitão Pedrosa
- Patrícia Poeta
- Osmar Santos
- Silvio Santos
- Fausto Silva
- Jô Soares
- Wallace Souza
- Íris Stefanelli
- Supla
- Marcelo Tas
- Xuxa

== Canada ==
- Bryan Baeumler
- Sugar (née Stephanie Beard)
- Bob Blumer
- Rick Campanelli
- Cindy Cheung
- Alyson Court
- Christine Cushing
- Roy Ward Dickson
- Ed the Sock
- Rob Feenie
- Mary Lou Finlay
- Sook-Yin Lee
- Peter Mansbridge
- Ben Mulroney
- Nardwuar the Human Serviette
- Knowlton Nash
- Anna Olson
- Rob Rainford
- Lloyd Robertson
- Evan Solomon
- Devon Soltendieck
- George Stroumboulopoulos
- Sarah Taylor
- Benny Yau

== Chile ==
- Pepe Abad
- Sigrid Alegría
- Raquel Argandoña
- Cecilia Bolocco
- Diana Bolocco
- Eduardo Bonvallet
- Roberto Bruce
- Felipe Camiroaga
- Claudia Conserva
- Javiera Contador
- Mariana Derderián
- Karen Doggenweiler
- Don Francisco
- Cristian de la Fuente
- Juan José Gurruchaga
- Margot Kahl
- Katty Kowaleczko
- Yamna Lobos
- Pablo Mackenna
- Raúl Mata
- Carolina Mestrovic
- Soledad Onetto
- Bárbara Rebolledo
- Maura Rivera
- Fernando Solabarrieta
- Tonka Tomicic
- Gabriela Velasco
- Julia Vial

== Colombia ==
- Carolina Acevedo
- Juan David Agudelo
- Adriana Arboleda
- Alejandra Azcárate
- Jorge Barón
- Félix de Bedout
- Silvia Corzo
- María Lucía Fernández
- Margarita Rosa de Francisco
- Jaime Garzón
- Amparo Grisales
- Patricia Janiot
- Paulo Laserna Phillips
- Lina Marulanda
- Néstor Morales
- Hernán Orjuela
- Indhira Serrano
- Manuel Teodoro
- Diana Turbay
- Maria Cristina Uribe
- Jota Mario Valencia
- Virginia Vallejo
- Adriana Vargas
- Sofía Vergara
- Carlos Vives
- Inés María Zabaraín

== Costa Rica ==
- Maribel Guardia

== Cuba ==
- Rosaura Andreu
- Lili Estefan
- Liz Evora
- Niurka Marcos
- Raul de Molina

== Dominican Republic ==
- Nancy Alvarez
- Freddy Beras-Goico
- Charytín
- Ruth Ocumárez
- Birmania Rios
- Celines Toribio
- Vielka Valenzuela
- Amelia Vega
- Sandra Zaiter

== Egypt ==
- Sarah Khalifa

== El Salvador ==
- Ana Yancy Clavel
- Mauricio Funes
- Willie Maldonado

== France ==
- Cyril Hanouna
- Rachid Arhab
- Arthur
- François Bachy
- Thierry Beccaro
- Laurent Boyer
- Denis Brogniart
- Philippe Dana
- Fabienne Égal
- Flavie Flament
- Alex Goude
- Thomas Hugues
- Éric Jean-Jean
- Frédéric Joly
- Yvan Le Bolloc'h
- Gaël Leforestier
- Frédéric Lopez
- Nelson Monfort
- Laurent Petitguillaume
- Stéphane Plaza
- Jean-Luc Reichmann
- Michel Robbe
- Philippe Risoli
- Laurent Romejko

== Germany ==
- Götz Alsmann
- Hugo Egon Balder
- Alfred Biolek
- Jan Böhmermann
- Guido Cantz
- Elton
- Frank Elstner
- Joachim Fuchsberger
- Oliver Geissen
- Thomas Gottschalk
- Dieter Thomas Heck
- Klaas Heufer-Umlauf
- Vera Int-Veen
- Günther Jauch
- Hape Kerkeling
- Ulla Kock am Brink
- Kurt Krömer
- Hans-Joachim Kulenkampff
- Robert Lembke
- Jürgen von der Lippe
- Ingolf Lück
- Ralph Morgenstern
- Carmen Nebel
- Kai Pflaume
- Jörg Pilawa
- Oliver Pocher
- Stefan Raab
- Ilja Richter
- Hans Rosenthal
- Michael Schanze
- Harald Schmidt
- Margarethe Schreinemakers
- Wim Thoelke
- Christine Westermann
- Joko Winterscheidt
- Sonja Zietlow

== Guatemala ==
- Héctor Sandarti

== Honduras ==
- Renato Alvarez
- Aníbal Barrow
- Aldo Calderón van Dyke
- Maity Interiano
- Oscar Kilgore
- Juan Fernando Lobo
- Satcha Pretto
- David Romero Ellner
- Jonathan Roussel

== Hong Kong ==
- Bill Chan
- Nadia Chan
- Natalis Chan
- Adam Cheng
- Ronald Cheng
- Heidi Chu
- Linda Chung
- Chung King Fai
- Hacken Lee
- Joey Leung
- Patricia Liu
- Lydia Sum
- Tam Yuk Ying
- Angela Tong
- Natalie Tong
- Eric Tsang
- Kate Tsui
- Liza Wang
- Dayo Wong
- Natalie Wong
- Shirley Yeung

== Iceland ==
- Hemmi Gunn

== India ==
- Sudhir Chaudhary
- Rohit Sardana
- Arnab Goswami
- Rohit Gandhi

== Israel ==
- Gil Hovav

== Italy ==
- Aldo, Giovanni & Giacomo
- Pippo Baudo
- Paula Bellini
- Mike Bongiorno
- Paolo Bonolis
- Adriano Celentano
- Walter Chiari
- Antonella Clerici
- Corrado
- Maurizio Costanzo
- Rita Dalla Chiesa
- Maria De Filippi
- Barbara D'Urso
- Fiorello
- Michelle Hunziker
- Paolo Limiti
- Giancarlo Magalli
- Alessia Marcuzzi
- Davide Mengacci
- Gianni Morandi
- Giorgio Panariello
- Michele Santoro
- Gerry Scotti
- Enzo Tortora
- Mara Venier
- Simona Ventura
- Bruno Vespa

== Japan ==
- Hiroshi Abe
- Sawako Agawa
- Kinya Aikawa
- Sanma Akashiya
- Yukio Aoshima
- Satoshi Hatakeyama
- Junichi Ishida
- Yujiro Ishihara
- Norio Ishizawa
- Takeshi Kitano
- Tetsuko Kuroyanagi
- Monta Mino
- Hikari Ota
- Norikazu Otsuka
- Ikki Sawamura
- Masao Sueda
- Shinichi Takeda

== Malaysia ==
- Alvin Anthons
- Jalaluddin Hassan
- Sarimah Ibrahim
- Daphne Iking
- Hani Mohsin
- Aznil Nawawi
- Peter Pek
- Afdlin Shauki
- Aishah Sinclair
- Hannah Tan
- Lillian Too

== Malta ==
- Gillian Attard
- Peppi Azzoppardi
- Clint Bajada
- Claudette Pace
- Frederick Zammit

== Mexico ==
- Javier Alatorre
- Rebecca de Alba
- Alfonso de Anda
- Raul Araiza
- Fernando Arau
- Carmen Aristegui
- Pedro Armendáriz Jr.
- Lolita Ayala
- Mauricio Barcelata
- Renato Bartilotti
- Luz Blanchet
- Wendy Braga
- Erika Buenfil
- Verónica Castro
- Omar Chaparro
- María Antonieta Collins
- César Costa
- Tony Dalton
- Anabel Ferreira
- Omar Fierro
- Laura Flores
- Rosana Franco
- Gabriela Frías
- Miguel Galván
- Bibi Gaytán
- Maribel Guardia
- Lourdes Guerrero
- Enrique Guzmán
- Plutarco Haza
- Martha Higareda
- Israel Jaitovich
- Ernesto Laguardia
- Olivia Leyva
- José Ángel Llamas
- María Eugenia Llamas
- Joaquín López-Doriga
- Renato López
- Carlos Loret de Mola
- Lucero
- Tony MacFarland
- Adrián Makala
- Bianca Marroquín
- José Marroquín
- Karla Martínez
- Penélope Menchaca
- Rafael Mercadante
- Adela Micha
- César Millán
- Galilea Montijo
- Montserrat Oliver
- Guillermo Ortega Ruiz
- Jorge Ortiz de Pinedo
- Dominika Paleta
- Silvia Pinal
- Jorge Poza
- Kristoff Raczynski
- Adal Ramones
- Jorge Ramos
- Marco Antonio Regil
- Lorena Rojas
- Alessandra Rosaldo
- Diego Schoening
- Héctor Soberón
- Ilana Sod
- Camila Sodi
- Javier Solórzano
- Paco Stanley
- Alan Tacher
- Tatiana
- Arath de la Torre
- Gloria Trevi
- Angélica Vale
- Raúl Velasco
- Horacio Villalobos
- Abraham Zabludovsky
- Jacobo Zabludovsky
- Jorge Zarza

== Netherlands ==
- Marijke Amado
- Patty Brard
- Lou van Burg
- Rudi Carrell
- Sylvie Meis
- Linda de Mol

== New Zealand ==
- Judy Bailey
- Hilary Barry
- Dominic Bowden
- Clint Brown
- Geoff Bryan
- Jim Hickey
- John Hawkesby
- Kate Hawkesby
- Tony Johnston
- Hamish McKay
- Mike McRoberts
- Tony Veitch
- Peter Williams

== Peru ==
- Gastón Acurio
- Tati Alcántara
- Augusto Álvarez Rodrich
- Laura Bozzo
- Augusto Ferrando
- Kiko Ledgard
- Jimena Lindo
- Guido Lombardi
- Pablo de Madalengoitia
- Santiago Magill
- María Julia Mantilla
- Maricarmen Marín
- Gianella Neyra
- Ana María Picasso
- Luis Ángel Pinasco
- Gisela Ponce de León
- Tula Rodríguez
- Jaime Salinas
- Johanna San Miguel
- Karen Schwarz
- Ricky Tosso
- Gisela Valcárcel
- Sandra Vergara
- Patty Wong
- Antonio Zapata

== Poland ==
- Aleksandra Szwed

== Puerto Rico ==
- José Miguel Agrelot
- María Celeste Arrarás
- Raymond Arrieta
- Shanira Blanco
- Giselle Blondet
- Yoyo Boing
- Jesse Calderón
- Awilda Carbia
- Deborah Carthy-Deu
- Paquito Cordero
- Sonya Cortés
- Dagmar
- Dreuxilla Divine
- Carmen Dominicci
- Daniela Droz
- Alexandra Fuentes
- El Gangster
- Alfred D. Herger
- Rafael Jose
- Carmen Jovet
- Sunshine Logroño
- Johnny Lozada
- Marisol Malaret
- Hector Marcano
- Walter Mercado
- Eddie Miró
- Rafo Muñiz
- Tommy Muñiz
- Sonia Noemí
- Luis Francisco Ojeda
- Cary Oliver
- Juan Manuel García Passalacqua
- Silverio Pérez
- Carlos Ponce
- Rafael Quiñones Vidal
- Luis Antonio Rivera
- Johanna Rosaly
- Xavier Serbiá
- Luis Vigoreaux
- Luisito Vigoreaux
- Jennifer Wolff

== Romania ==
- Dan Diaconescu
- Gabriela Cristea
- Gabriela Firea
- Șerban Huidu
- Cabral Ibacka
- Robert Turcescu

== Spain ==
- Adriana Abenia
- Silvia Abril
- Carmen Alcayde
- Anabel Alonso
- Emilio Aragón
- Eva Arguiñano
- Karlos Arguiñano
- Miriam Díaz Aroca
- Lorena Berdún
- Ana Blanco
- Pepa Bueno
- Rosa María Calaf
- María Teresa Campos
- David Cantero
- Jaime Cantizano
- Sara Carbonero
- Xosé Castro Roig
- Alberto Chicote
- Jesús Cintora
- Berta Collado
- Patricia Conde
- Penélope Cruz
- Juan Echanove
- Pedro Erquicia
- Jordi Estadella
- Belén Esteban
- Florentino Fernández
- Jorge Fernández Madinabeitia
- Sonia Ferrer
- Carles Francino
- Iñaki Gabilondo
- José Luis Garci
- Ramón García
- Concha García Campoy
- Ana García-Siñeriz
- Antonio Garrido
- Isabel Gemio
- Mayra Gómez Kemp
- Jordi González Belart
- El Gran Wyoming
- Cayetana Guillén Cuervo
- Eva Hache
- Carmen Hornillos
- Màxim Huerta
- Jordi Hurtado
- Anne Igartiburu
- José María Íñigo
- Boris Izaguirre
- Silvia Jato
- Iker Jiménez
- Federico Jiménez Losantos
- Dolores Johnson Sastre
- Paloma Lago
- Manolo Lama
- Carlos Latre
- Kiko Ledgard
- Juan Ramón Lucas
- Luis Mariñas
- Ángel Martín
- Dani Mateo
- Carmen Maura
- Risto Mejide
- Lorenzo Milá
- Mercedes Milá
- Luis Miravitlles
- Kira Miró
- José Mota
- Pablo Motos
- Miki Nadal
- Ana Obregón
- Letizia Ortiz
- Bertín Osborne
- Paz Padilla
- Cristina Pardo
- Ana Pastor
- Arturo Pérez-Reverte
- Hilario Pino
- Pedro Piqueras
- Matías Prats Luque
- Eduard Punset
- Miguel de la Quadra-Salcedo
- Ana Rosa Quintana
- Ivonne Reyes
- Félix Rodríguez de la Fuente
- Berto Romero
- Constantino Romero
- Pilar Rubio
- Belén Rueda
- Sandra Sabatés
- Encarna Sánchez
- Raquel Sánchez-Silva
- J. J. Santos
- Rosa María Sardá
- Carmen Sevilla
- Anna Simon
- Carlos Sobera
- Juan Tamariz
- Cristina Tàrrega
- Adela Úcar
- Alfredo Urdaci
- Laura Valenzuela
- Jesús Vázquez
- Jorge Javier Vázquez
- Paula Vázquez Picallo
- Concha Velasco
- Samanta Villar
- Usun Yoon

== Sri Lanka ==
- Lasantha Wickrematunge

== South Korea ==
- Kang Ho-dong
- Yoo Jae-suk

== United Kingdom ==
- Michelle Ackerley
- Katya Adler
- Ayo Akinwolere
- Matt Allwright
- Eamonn Andrews
- Alexander Armstrong
- Katy Ashworth
- Michael Aspel
- David Attenborough
- Richard Ayoade
- Bl1nk Bot 3 (Warrick Brownlow-Pike)
- Steve Backshall
- Richard Bacon
- Bill Bailey
- Danny Baker
- Matt Baker
- Nick Baker
- Clare Balding
- Zoe Ball
- Matt Barbet
- Liz Barker
- Sue Barker
- John Barrowman
- Chris Beardshaw
- Tanya Beckett
- Angellica Bell
- Graham Bell
- Jon Bentley
- Alex Beresford
- Christine Bleakley
- David Bobin
- Liz Bonnin
- Ned Boulting
- Jason Bradbury
- Julia Bradbury
- Fern Britton
- Dionne Bromfield
- Natalie Brown
- Fiona Bruce
- Dan Jones
- Gordon Buchanan
- Michael Buerk
- Cerrie Burnell
- Mike Bushell
- Ashleigh Butler
- Susan Calman
- Dallas Campbell
- Nicky Campbell
- Alan Carr
- Jimmy Carr
- Liz Carr
- Adrian Chiles
- Radzi Chinyanganya
- Rylan Clark
- Jeremy Clarkson
- Nick Clegg
- Jo Coburn
- Dougie Colon
- Brian Conley
- James Corden (occasionally)
- Victoria Coren Mitchell
- Fearne Cotton
- Tess Daly
- Josie d'Arby
- Aidan Davis
- Evan Davis
- Warwick Davis
- Andy Day
- Cat Deeley (occasionally)
- Joel Defries
- Ortis Deley
- Alfie Deyes (occasionally)
- David Dickinson
- David Dimbleby
- Monty Don
- Declan Donnelly of Ant & Dec
- Stacey Dooley
- Martin Dougan
- Jill Douglas
- Tyger Drew-Honey
- Mark Durden-Smith
- Noel Edmonds
- Huw Edwards
- Jonathan Edwards
- Rick Edwards
- Gavin Esler
- Chris Evans
- Vanessa Feltz
- Judy Finnigan of Richard & Judy
- India Fisher
- Caroline Flack
- Adam Fleming
- Justin Fletcher
- Sean Fletcher
- Shannon Flynn
- Kate Garraway
- Mel Giedroyc
- JB Gill
- Peter Ginn
- Ruth Goodman
- Dave Gorman
- Joanna Gosling
- Lizzie Greenwood-Hughes
- Bear Grylls
- Robert Hall
- Laura Hamilton
- Richard Hammond
- Ellie Harrison
- Jasmine Harman
- Barney Harwood
- Charlotte Hawkins
- Tom Heap
- Nelufar Hedayat
- Nick Hewer
- Fanny Hill
- Jane Hill
- Chris Hollins
- Eamonn Holmes
- Sarah-Jane Honeywell
- Jules Hudson
- Bettany Hughes
- London Hughes
- Martin Hughes-Games
- Ben Hull
- Kate Humble
- Marvin Humes
- Rochelle Humes
- John Humphrys
- Gemma Hunt
- Mishal Husain
- Gary Imlach
- John Inverdale
- Hazel Irvine
- Chris Jarvis
- Chris Johnson
- Aled Jones
- Alex Jones
- Gethin Jones
- Phil Jones
- Steve Jones
- Jon Kay
- Peter Kay
- Vernon Kay
- Lorraine Kelly
- Patrick Kielty
- Carol Kirkwood
- Carol Klein
- Nick Knowles
- Laura Kuenssberg
- Jeremy Kyle
- Dave Lamb
- Ruth Langsford
- Pui Fan Lee
- Ed Leigh
- Keith Lemon (Leigh Francis)
- Gary Lineker
- Dominic Littlewood
- Georgia Lock
- Gabby Logan
- Charlie Luxton
- Richard Madeley of Richard & Judy
- Jason Manford
- Andrew Marr
- Nigel Marven
- Sam Matterface
- James May
- Davina McCall
- Kevin McCloud
- Richard McCourt of Dick and Dom
- Simon McCoy
- George McGavin
- Steph McGovern
- Paddy McGuinness
- Lee McKenzie
- Andrea McLean
- Anthony McPartlin of Ant & Dec
- Ray Mears
- Melinda Messenger
- Louise Minchin
- Jason Mohammad
- Piers Morgan
- Stephen Mulhern
- Naga Munchetty
- Dermot Murnaghan
- Sheree Murphy
- Clive Myrie
- Andrew Neil
- Mark Nicholas
- Sam Nixon of Sam & Mark
- Graham Norton
- Bill Oddie
- Melvin Odoom
- Ore Oduba
- Dermot O'Leary
- Neil Oliver
- Richard Osman
- Nicholas Owen
- Chris Packham
- Jeremy Paxman
- Daniel Pearson
- Sue Perkins
- Suzi Perry
- Andi Peters
- Ed Petrie
- Fiona Phillips
- Matthew Pinsent
- Johny Pitts
- Lauren Platt
- Caroline Quentin
- Anita Rani
- Esther Rantzen
- Sophie Raworth
- Alex Riley
- Susanna Reid
- Mark Rhodes of Sam & Mark
- Rachel Riley
- Shane Richie
- Ted Robbins
- Anne Robinson
- Tony Robinson
- Linda Robson
- Gaby Roslin
- Jonathan Ross
- Justin Rowlatt
- Lindsey Russell
- Zoe Salmon
- Cat Sandion
- Natalie Sawyer
- Phillip Schofield
- John Sergeant
- Sonali Shah
- Suzanne Shaw
- Brendan Sheerin
- Ben Shephard
- Ben Shires
- Ranvir Singh
- Helen Skelton
- Sidney Sloane
- Dan Snow
- Jon Snow
- Jon Sopel
- Cel Spellman
- Charlie Stayt
- Jeff Stelling
- Iain Stirling
- Michaela Strachan
- Joe Sugg
- Joe Swash
- Joe Swift
- Chris Tarrant
- Dodge T. Dog (Warrick Brownlow-Pike)
- Hacker T. Dog (Phil Fletcher)
- Katie Thistleton
- Kate Thornton
- Alan Titchmarsh
- Sandi Toksvig
- Inel Tomlinson of Johnny & Inel
- Bill Turnbull
- Chris van Tulleken of Dr. Chris & Dr. Xand
- Xand van Tulleken of Dr. Chris & Dr. Xand
- Johnny Vaughan
- Jeremy Vine
- Dougie Vipond
- Carol Vorderman
- David Walliams
- Dan Walker
- Rob Walker
- Bradley Walsh
- Holly Walsh
- Kirsty Wark
- Sian Welby
- Rebecca Wilcox
- Rav Wilding
- Naomi Wilkinson
- Tim Willcox
- Amy Williams
- Mark Williams
- Sian Williams
- Emma Willis
- Holly Willoughby
- Claudia Winkleman
- Alex Winters
- Dale Winton
- Duncan Wisbey
- Richard Wisker
- Terry Wogan
- James Wong
- Tim Wonnacott
- Dominic Wood of Dick and Dom
- Victoria Wood
- Grace Woodward
- Mark Wright
- Reggie Yates

== United States ==
- Uzo Aduba
- Jacqueline Anderson
- Tom Arnold
- Tracy Austin
- Bob Barker
- Tom Bergeron
- Paul Bouche
- Hayvi Bouzo
- Brooke Burke
- Carol Burnett
- Nick Cannon
- Drew Carey
- Jann Carl
- Johnny Carson
- Julie Chen Moonves
- Bob Circosta
- Dick Clark
- Roy Clark
- James Corden
- Don Cornelius
- Walter Cronkite
- Cat Deeley
- Ellen DeGeneres
- Hugh Downs
- Jimmy Fallon
- Whoopi Goldberg
- Samantha Harris
- Mary Hart
- Jimmy Kimmel
- Jay Leno
- David Letterman
- Dean Martin
- Ed McMahon
- Nancy O'Dell
- Rosie O'Donnell
- Marlin Perkins
- Regis Philbin
- Jeff Probst
- Birmania Rios
- Kelly Ripa
- Joan Rivers
- Pat Sajak
- Lauren Sanchez
- Cristina Saralegui
- Ryan Seacrest
- Mark Steines
- Jon Stewart
- Ed Sullivan
- Alex Trebek
- Vanna White
- Wendy Williams
- Oprah Winfrey
- Jerome T. Youngman

== Venezuela ==
- Cristina Abuhazi
- Eylen Adrian
- Juan Carlos Alarcón
- Leo Aldana
- Henry Altuve
- Andreína Álvarez
- Cayito Aponte
- Antonio Aragon
- Osman Aray
- Noheli Arteaga
- Alfonzo Alvarez Gallardo
- Miguel Avalos
- Corina Azopardo
- Goizeder Azúa
- Michelle Badillo
- Antonella Baricelli
- Samir Bazzi
- Paula Bellini
- Amador Bendayán
- Josemith Bermúdez
- Shia Bertoni
- Annarella Bono
- Bolivia Bottome
- Napoleon Bravo
- Ely Bravo
- Alexandra Braun
- Karina Braun
- Luis Brito Arocha
- Rafael "Pollo" Brito
- Nelson Bustamante
- Sergio Cabrera
- Mariela Capriles
- Enza Carbone
- Roland Carreño
- Judith Castillo
- Corina Castro
- María Teresa Chacín
- Luis Chataing
- Hugo Chavez
- Catherine Correia
- Milka Chulina
- Ana Teresa Cifuentes
- Mariela Celis
- Gilberto Correa
- Catherine Correia
- Liana Cortijo
- Efrain de la Cerda
- Chiquinquira Delgado
- Maite Delgado
- Amaury José Díaz
- Dhameliz Díaz
- Bettsimar Diaz
- Javier Diaz
- Joselo Diaz
- Simon Diaz
- Simón Díaz Jr.
- Dino D’Avanzo
- María de Lourdes Devonish
- Wanda D'Isidoro
- Daniela di Giacomo
- Isa Dobles
- Cappy Donzella
- Susana Duijm
- Eva Ekvall
- Alfredo Escalante
- Gaby Espino
- Carlos Fraga
- Patricia Fuenmayor
- Catherine Fulop
- Flor Garcia
- Maria Laura Garcia
- Oscar Garcia
- Viviana Gibelli
- Paul Gillman
- Flavia Gleske
- Cesar Gonzalez
- Guillermo Gonzalez
- Luis Guillermo Gonzalez
- Raul Gonzalez
- Rafael Guinand
- Amanda Gutierrez
- Eva Gutierrez
- Carlos Guzman
- Jose Hernandez
- Richard Hernandez
- Flor Isava-Fonseca
- Boris Izaguirre
- Sofia Imber
- Ly Jonaitis
- Daniela Kosán
- Esthefany Kolman
- Marco Antonio Lacavalerie
- Dayra Lambis
- Miguelangel Landa
- Cynthia Lander
- Raquel Lares
- Eladio Lárez
- Leyla Leal
- Alfredo Ledezma
- Terry J. Leon
- Jean Paul Leroux
- Ivan Loscher
- Gioia Lombardini
- Diony López
- Gonzalo López Silvero
- Concetta Lo Dolce
- Albany Lozada
- Rudy Marquez
- Belen Marrero
- Willy Martin
- Aurora Martinez
- Cecilia Martínez
- Daniel Martinez
- Oscar Martinez
- Tito Martínez del Box
- Adriana Marval
- Carlos Mata
- Andrea Matthies
- Mercy Mayorca
- Luis Eduardo Mejías
- Milagros Mendoza
- Neyla Moronta
- Pedro Jose Mena
- Debora Menicucci
- Carlos Misle
- Juan Manuel Montesinos
- Hector Monteverde
- Maria Eugenia Mosquera
- Nestor Luis Negron
- Luis Olavarrieta
- Miriam Ochoa
- Frederik Oldenburg
- Carlos Omobono
- Rosanna Ordonez
- Scarlet Ortiz
- Fanny Otatti
- Renny Ottolina
- Bárbara Palacios
- Isabel Palacios
- Mónica Pasqualotto
- Mary Pili Hernandez
- Gustavo Pierral
- Rosario Prieto
- Carmen Victoria Perez
- Neyda Plessman
- Erasmo Provenza
- Hannelly Quintero
- Ninon Racca
- Abelardo Raidi
- Cecilia Ramirez
- Bob Rangel
- Melisa Rauseo
- Veronica Razquin
- Ivonne Reyes
- Desiree Rolando
- Norelys Rodríguez
- Rashel Rodriguez
- Ruddy Rodríguez
- Kerly Ruiz
- Mariángel Ruiz
- Rodolfo Saglimbeni
- Jalymar Salomón
- Emilio Santana
- Raul Sanz Machado
- Marietta Santana
- Andy Salandy
- Chelique Sarabia
- Daniel Sarcos
- Altagracia Sarmiento
- Ana La Salvia
- Leda Santodomingo
- Victor Saume
- Carlos Serfaty
- Nina Sicilia
- Henrys Silva
- Jason Silva
- Simoney
- Daniel Somaroo
- Stayfree
- Marianne Suarez
- Layla Sukar
- Miguel Thodée
- Lilian Tintori
- Ricardo Tirado
- Pedro Trebbau
- Luis Turmero
- Orlando Urdaneta
- Anna Vaccarella
- Caterina Valentino
- Winston Vallenilla
- Clemente Vargas Jr.
- Erika de la Vega
- Hilda Vera Fortique
- Gabriela Vergara
- José Manuel Vieira
- Leonardo Villalobos
- Rudolfo Wellish
- Doris Wels
- Aida Yespica
- Nestor Zavarce
- Eglantina Zingg
- Norah Zurita

== Middle East ==
- es:Nirvana El-Abd

== See also ==
- List of news presenters
