= Starstruck (2022 TV series) =

British television talent series

- Genre: Talent show
- Created by: Banijay
- Directed by: David Tench (music)
- Presented by: Olly Murs
- Judges: Adam Lambert; Beverley Knight; Sheridan Smith (2022); Shania Twain (2023); Ronan Keating (guest); Jason Manford
- Theme music composer: Marc Sylvan
- Country of origin: United Kingdom
- Original language: English
- No. of series: 2
- No. of episodes: 15

Production
- Executive producers: Cat Lawson; Leanne Witcoop; Dom Waugh
- Producers: Kim Allinson (series); Elaine O’Brien (line)
- Production location: ITV Studios Bovingdon
- Camera setup: Multi-camera
- Running time: 75–90 minutes (inc. adverts)
- Production company: Remarkable Entertainment

Original release
- Network: ITV
- Release: 12 February 2022 – 8 April 2023

Related
- Stars in Their Eyes; Soundmixshow

Starstruck is a British television talent series that has aired on ITV from 12 February 2022 to 8 April 2023. It features a singing contest in which members of the public impersonate showbiz stars. The series is presented by Olly Murs with a judging panel, in the first series, consisting of Adam Lambert, Beverley Knight, Jason Manford and Sheridan Smith. Smith left the show after the first series due to other commitments and was replaced by Shania Twain. The series is described by some media outlets as a revived and reformatted version of Stars in Their Eyes. In September 2023, it was announced that the show had been cancelled after two series.

== Background and history ==
In March 2020, it was reported that ITV would replace The X Factor with a second revival/reformat of Stars in Their Eyes later in the year, however this time with a celebrity panel of judges. In December 2020, new reports suggested that ITV would revive the show in Autumn 2021, under the new name of Starstruck, with Sheridan Smith, Adam Lambert, Beverley Knight and Jason Manford as judges. In April 2021, it was reported that Olly Murs would host the show. It began filming that month at ITV Studios Bovingdon, and was expected to air that summer. In August, ITV previewed Starstruck at the Edinburgh International Television Festival and in October, it was confirmed that the series would air in 2022.

The show was finally scheduled for broadcast in February 2022, with the change to the format being that three 'tribute artists' will perform at the same time as each other, with four different music acts covered each week. Six 75 minute programmes were ordered by the network along with a 90 minute final which saw the winner take home a £50,000 prize. The first series was won by Rachael Hawnt performing as Cher.

In April 2022, ITV announced that Starstruck would be returning for a second season with the same judging panel. However in August 2022, it was confirmed that Smith would not be returning as a judge for the second series due to schedule conflicts and filming commitments. On 30 August 2022, Shania Twain announced via her Instagram channel that she would join series 2 as a judge. This was confirmed by ITV the next day. The second series began airing on 18 February 2023 on ITV1 and ITVX, and was filmed in September 2022 at ITV Studios Bovingdon. Ronan Keating was a guest judge in place of Twain, who was absent due to schedule conflicts, for two episodes. The series was won by Abbie Edwards performing as Adele.

== Cancellation ==
In June 2023, it was reported that plans for a third series had been put on hold but could return in the future. However in September 2023, presenter Olly Murs confirmed that the show had been axed.

== Series overview ==
Series	Start date	End date	Episodes
1	12 February 2022	2 April 2022	7
2	18 February 2023	8 April 2023	8

== Series 1 (2022) ==
=== Episode 1 (12 February) ===
Order	Team	Appeared as...	Performing...	Result
1	Rob Lea	Freddie Mercury of Queen	"Don't Stop Me Now"	Through to sing-off
1	Michael Callisto	Freddie Mercury of Queen	"Don't Stop Me Now"	Through to sing-off
1	Joe Gash	Freddie Mercury of Queen	"Don't Stop Me Now"	Through to sing-off
2	Connie Lamb	Ariana Grande	"One Last Time"	Eliminated
2	Ellis Wood	Ariana Grande	"One Last Time"	Eliminated
2	Abi Tucker	Ariana Grande	"One Last Time"	Eliminated
3	Dayton Grey	Marvin Gaye	"Let's Get It On"	Eliminated
3	Jordan Charles	Marvin Gaye	"Let's Get It On"	Eliminated
3	Coffee	Marvin Gaye	"Let's Get It On"	Eliminated
4	Harriet Richardson-Cockerline	Lady Gaga	"Bad Romance"	Eliminated
4	Georgia Tarring	Lady Gaga	"Bad Romance"	Eliminated
4	Ella McCready	Lady Gaga	"Bad Romance"	Eliminated

Sing-off

Contestant	Performing...	Result
Rob Lea	"Somebody to Love"	Through to the final
Michael Callisto	"Somebody to Love"	Eliminated
Joe Gash	"Somebody to Love"	Eliminated

=== Episode 2 (19 February) ===
Order	Team	Appeared as...	Performing...	Result
1	Rachael Hawnt	Cher	"If I Could Turn Back Time"	Through to sing-off
1	Sarah Kemp	Cher	"If I Could Turn Back Time"	Through to sing-off
1	Paul Houldsworth	Cher	"If I Could Turn Back Time"	Through to sing-off
2	Elesha Moses	Alicia Keys	"Empire State of Mind (Part II) Broken Down"	Eliminated
2	Natalie Powell	Alicia Keys	"Empire State of Mind (Part II) Broken Down"	Eliminated
2	Farida Matthews	Alicia Keys	"Empire State of Mind (Part II) Broken Down"	Eliminated
3	Louis Nayler	George Michael	"Faith"	Eliminated
3	Mark Williams	George Michael	"Faith"	Eliminated
3	Craig Webb	George Michael	"Faith"	Eliminated
4	Jordan Williams	Michael Bublé	"Feeling Good"	Eliminated
4	Josh Hindle	Michael Bublé	"Feeling Good"	Eliminated
4	Jack Clarke	Michael Bublé	"Feeling Good"	Eliminated

Sing-off

Contestant	Performing...	Result
Rachael Hawnt	"Strong Enough"	Through to the final
Sarah Kemp	"Strong Enough"	Eliminated
Paul Houldsworth	"Strong Enough"	Eliminated

=== Episode 3 (26 February) ===
Order	Team	Appeared as...	Performing...	Result
1	Landi Oshinowo	Tina Turner	"Proud Mary"	Through to sing-off
1	Annastasia Baker	Tina Turner	"Proud Mary"	Through to sing-off
1	Holly Bannis	Tina Turner	"Proud Mary"	Through to sing-off
2	Jak Cooper	Rag'n'Bone Man	"Human"	Eliminated
2	Liam Price	Rag'n'Bone Man	"Human"	Eliminated
2	Richard Comfort	Rag'n'Bone Man	"Human"	Eliminated
3	Luke Stanley	Olly Murs	"Dance with Me Tonight"	Eliminated
3	Anthony	Olly Murs	"Dance with Me Tonight"	Eliminated
3	Simon Walker	Olly Murs	"Dance with Me Tonight"	Eliminated
4	Kayleigh Marie Morgan	Celine Dion	"My Heart Will Go On"	Eliminated
4	Esther Fletcher	Celine Dion	"My Heart Will Go On"	Eliminated
4	Frankie Swoffer	Celine Dion	"My Heart Will Go On"	Eliminated

Sing-off

Contestant	Performing...	Result
Landi Oshinowo	"What's Love Got to Do with It"	Eliminated
Annastasia Baker	"What's Love Got to Do with It"	Through to the final
Holly Bannis	"What's Love Got to Do with It"	Eliminated

=== Episode 4 (5 March) ===
Order	Team	Appeared as...	Performing...	Result
1	Gareth Jenkins	Elton John	"I'm Still Standing"	Eliminated
1	James Lewis	Elton John	"I'm Still Standing"	Eliminated
1	Steve Hollington	Elton John	"I'm Still Standing"	Eliminated
2	Amy Harriet	Billie Eilish	"No Time to Die"	Through to sing-off
2	Frankie Maddin	Billie Eilish	"No Time to Die"	Through to sing-off
2	Claudia Thompson	Billie Eilish	"No Time to Die"	Through to sing-off
3	Abigail Patrick	Kylie Minogue	"Spinning Around"	Eliminated
3	Suzy Hopwood	Kylie Minogue	"Spinning Around"	Eliminated
3	Anne Martin	Kylie Minogue	"Spinning Around"	Eliminated
4	Jason Andrew	John Legend	"All of Me"	Eliminated
4	Clinton-Elvis	John Legend	"All of Me"	Eliminated
4	Gershom Brown	John Legend	"All of Me"	Eliminated

Sing-off

Contestant	Performing...	Result
Amy Harriet	"Everything I Wanted"	Eliminated
Frankie Maddin	"Everything I Wanted"	Through to the final
Claudia Thompson	"Everything I Wanted"	Eliminated

=== Episode 5 (12 March) ===
Order	Team	Appeared as...	Performing...	Result
1	Taryn McMahon	Whitney Houston	"I Wanna Dance with Somebody (Who Loves Me)"	Eliminated
1	Viquichele Cross	Whitney Houston	"I Wanna Dance with Somebody (Who Loves Me)"	Eliminated
1	Zindzi Thomas	Whitney Houston	"I Wanna Dance with Somebody (Who Loves Me)"	Eliminated
2	James Shields	Gary Barlow of Take That	"Greatest Day"	Eliminated
2	James Hutchinson	Gary Barlow of Take That	"Greatest Day"	Eliminated
2	Craig Halford	Gary Barlow of Take That	"Greatest Day"	Eliminated
3	Joe Bradwell	Harry Styles of One Direction	"Watermelon Sugar"	Eliminated
3	Brandon Hunt	Harry Styles of One Direction	"Watermelon Sugar"	Eliminated
3	Steffan Mcgechie	Harry Styles of One Direction	"Watermelon Sugar"	Eliminated
4	Keeley Smith	Barbra Streisand	"Don't Rain on My Parade"	Through to sing-off
4	Kearra Bethany	Barbra Streisand	"Don't Rain on My Parade"	Through to sing-off
4	Ailesha Austen	Barbra Streisand	"Don't Rain on My Parade"	Through to sing-off

Sing-off

Contestant	Performing...	Result
Keeley Smith	"The Way We Were"	Through to the final
Kearra Bethany	"The Way We Were"	Eliminated
Ailesha Austen	"The Way We Were"	Eliminated

=== Episode 6 (26 March) ===
Order	Team	Appeared as...	Performing...	Result
1	Kezia Povey	Miley Cyrus	"Midnight Sky"	Eliminated
1	Emma Wright	Miley Cyrus	"Midnight Sky"	Eliminated
1	Luce	Miley Cyrus	"Midnight Sky"	Eliminated
2	Jared Richer	Justin Timberlake	"Rock Your Body"	Eliminated
2	Gathan Cheema	Justin Timberlake	"Rock Your Body"	Eliminated
2	Ryan Hunter	Justin Timberlake	"Rock Your Body"	Eliminated
3	Patsy Balfour	Amy Winehouse	"Rehab"	Eliminated
3	Emily Wallbank	Amy Winehouse	"Rehab"	Eliminated
3	Eboney Jayne O Brien	Amy Winehouse	"Rehab"	Eliminated
4	Nick James	Lionel Richie	"Dancing on the Ceiling"	Through to sing-off
4	Jack Brindle	Lionel Richie	"Dancing on the Ceiling"	Through to sing-off
4	Fil Straughan	Lionel Richie	"Dancing on the Ceiling"	Through to sing-off

Sing-off

Contestant	Performing...	Result
Nick James	"Hello"	Eliminated
Jack Brindle	"Hello"	Eliminated
Fil Straughan	"Hello"	Through to the final

=== Final (2 April) ===
Order	Contestant	Appeared as...	Performing...
1	Annastasia Baker	Tina Turner	"Nutbush City Limits"
2	Rob Lea	Freddie Mercury of Queen	"We Are the Champions"
3	Frankie Maddin	Billie Eilish	"When the Party's Over"
4	Rachael Hawnt	Cher	"Believe"
5	Keeley Smith	Barbra Streisand	"Woman in Love"
6	Fil Straughan	Lionel Richie	"All Night Long (All Night)"

== Series 2 (2023) ==
The second series began on 18 February 2023. Shania Twain was not on the panel for two episodes this series due to her Vegas residency Let's Go! so her seat was taken by Boyzone's Ronan Keating.

=== Episode 1 (18 February) ===
- Group performance: Olly Murs & The Starstruck Judges – "(I Can't Get No) Satisfaction"

Order	Team	Appeared as...	Performing...	Result
1	Mark	Tom Jones	"It's Not Unusual"	Eliminated
1	Steve	Tom Jones	"It's Not Unusual"	Eliminated
1	Mel	Tom Jones	"It's Not Unusual"	Eliminated
2	Charley	Taylor Swift	"I Knew You Were Trouble"	Eliminated
2	Amy	Taylor Swift	"I Knew You Were Trouble"	Eliminated
2	Katie	Taylor Swift	"I Knew You Were Trouble"	Eliminated
3	Michael	Sam Smith	"Stay with Me"	Through to sing-off
3	Chris	Sam Smith	"Stay with Me"	Through to sing-off
3	Paul	Sam Smith	"Stay with Me"	Through to sing-off
4	Angel	Chaka Khan	"I'm Every Woman"	Eliminated
4	Treyc Cohen	Chaka Khan	"I'm Every Woman"	Eliminated
4	Gail	Chaka Khan	"I'm Every Woman"	Eliminated

Sing-off

Contestant	Performing...	Result
Michael	"Too Good at Goodbyes"	Eliminated
Chris	"Too Good at Goodbyes"	Through to the final
Paul	"Too Good at Goodbyes"	Eliminated

=== Episode 2 (25 February) ===
Order	Team	Appeared as...	Performing...	Result
1	Beth	Christina Aguilera	"Fighter"	Eliminated
1	Megan	Christina Aguilera	"Fighter"	Eliminated
1	Michelle	Christina Aguilera	"Fighter"	Eliminated
2	Dwaine	Usher	"Yeah!"	Eliminated
2	Ishy	Usher	"Yeah!"	Eliminated
2	Septimus	Usher	"Yeah!"	Eliminated
3	Chris	Meat Loaf	"Bat Out of Hell"	Through to sing-off
3	Paul	Meat Loaf	"Bat Out of Hell"	Through to sing-off
3	William	Meat Loaf	"Bat Out of Hell"	Through to sing-off
4	Nicole	Shania Twain	"Man! I Feel Like a Woman!"	Eliminated
4	Charlotte	Shania Twain	"Man! I Feel Like a Woman!"	Eliminated
4	Jade	Shania Twain	"Man! I Feel Like a Woman!"	Eliminated

Sing-off

Contestant	Performing...	Result
Chris	"I'd Do Anything for Love (But I Won't Do That)"	Eliminated
Paul	"I'd Do Anything for Love (But I Won't Do That)"	Eliminated
William	"I'd Do Anything for Love (But I Won't Do That)"	Through to the final

=== Episode 3 (4 March) ===
- Guest performance: Adam Lambert – "Ordinary World"

Order	Team	Appeared as...	Performing...	Result
1	Lee	Jon Bon Jovi of Bon Jovi	"Livin' on a Prayer"	Eliminated
1	Jon	Jon Bon Jovi of Bon Jovi	"Livin' on a Prayer"	Eliminated
1	Ash	Jon Bon Jovi of Bon Jovi	"Livin' on a Prayer"	Eliminated
2	Chanelle	Diana Ross	"Upside Down"	Eliminated
2	Sam	Diana Ross	"Upside Down"	Eliminated
2	Comfort	Diana Ross	"Upside Down"	Eliminated
3	George	Ed Sheeran	"Thinking Out Loud"	Through to sing-off
3	Jack	Ed Sheeran	"Thinking Out Loud"	Through to sing-off
3	Callum	Ed Sheeran	"Thinking Out Loud"	Through to sing-off
4	Natasha	Judy Garland	"Get Happy"	Eliminated
4	Emily	Judy Garland	"Get Happy"	Eliminated
4	Shelley	Judy Garland	"Get Happy"	Eliminated

Sing-off

Contestant	Performing...	Result
George	"The A Team"	Eliminated
Jack	"The A Team"	Eliminated
Callum	"The A Team"	Through to the final

=== Episode 4 (11 March) ===
- Guest performance: Beverley Knight – "Rock Steady"

Order	Team	Appeared as...	Performing...	Result
1	Scott	Robbie Williams	"Let Me Entertain You"	Eliminated
1	Davey	Robbie Williams	"Let Me Entertain You"	Eliminated
1	Karl	Robbie Williams	"Let Me Entertain You"	Eliminated
2	Holly	Stevie Nicks of Fleetwood Mac	"Edge of Seventeen"	Eliminated
2	Hattie	Stevie Nicks of Fleetwood Mac	"Edge of Seventeen"	Eliminated
2	Michelle	Stevie Nicks of Fleetwood Mac	"Edge of Seventeen"	Eliminated
3	Ali	Justin Bieber	"Sorry"	Eliminated
3	Elliot	Justin Bieber	"Sorry"	Eliminated
3	Jamie	Justin Bieber	"Sorry"	Eliminated
4	Tosin	Beyoncé	"Crazy in Love"	Through to sing-off
4	Esther-Olivia	Beyoncé	"Crazy in Love"	Through to sing-off
4	Rihanna	Beyoncé	"Crazy in Love"	Through to sing-off

Sing-off

Contestant	Performing...	Result
Tosin	"If I Were A Boy"	Eliminated
Esther-Olivia	"If I Were A Boy"	Through to the final
Rihanna	"If I Were A Boy"	Eliminated

=== Episode 5 (18 March) ===
- Guest judge: Ronan Keating

Order	Team	Appeared as...	Performing...	Result
1	Andrew	Frank Sinatra	"Theme from New York, New York"	Through to sing-off
1	Aiden	Frank Sinatra	"Theme from New York, New York"	Through to sing-off
1	Ryan	Frank Sinatra	"Theme from New York, New York"	Through to sing-off
2	Jane	Kate Bush	"Running Up That Hill"	Eliminated
2	Charlotte	Kate Bush	"Running Up That Hill"	Eliminated
2	Jackie	Kate Bush	"Running Up That Hill"	Eliminated
3	Cris	Bruno Mars	"Uptown Funk"	Eliminated
3	David	Bruno Mars	"Uptown Funk"	Eliminated
3	Nola	Bruno Mars	"Uptown Funk"	Eliminated
4	Remée Stoft	Rihanna	"Umbrella"	Eliminated
4	Iva	Rihanna	"Umbrella"	Eliminated
4	Malisa	Rihanna	"Umbrella"	Eliminated

Sing-off

Contestant	Performing...	Result
Andrew	"That's Life"	Through to the final
Aiden	"That's Life"	Eliminated
Ryan	"That's Life"	Eliminated

=== Episode 6 (25 March) ===
- Guest judge: Ronan Keating
- Guest performance: Beverley Knight and Adam Lambert – "Falling"
- Note: This episode was dedicated to contestant Ron Davis, who died on 28 February 2023

Order	Team	Appeared as...	Performing...	Result
1	Ron Davis	James Brown	"I Got You (I Feel Good)"	Eliminated
1	Emmanuel	James Brown	"I Got You (I Feel Good)"	Eliminated
1	Raphael	James Brown	"I Got You (I Feel Good)"	Eliminated
2	Tom	Elvis Presley	"Jailhouse Rock"	Eliminated
2	Kamen	Elvis Presley	"Jailhouse Rock"	Eliminated
2	Scott	Elvis Presley	"Jailhouse Rock"	Eliminated
3	Hollie-Blue	Bette Midler	"Wind Beneath My Wings"	Eliminated
3	Kiki	Bette Midler	"Wind Beneath My Wings"	Eliminated
3	Barbara	Bette Midler	"Wind Beneath My Wings"	Eliminated
4	Tasmin	Adele	"Easy on Me"	Through to the sing-off
4	Sam	Adele	"Easy on Me"	Through to the sing-off
4	Abbie Edwards	Adele	"Easy on Me"	Through to the sing-off

Sing-off

Contestant	Performing...	Result
Tasmin	"Rolling in the Deep"	Eliminated
Sam	"Rolling in the Deep"	Eliminated
Abbie Edwards	"Rolling in the Deep"	Through to the final

=== Episode 7 (1 April) ===
- Guest performance: Shania Twain – "Waking Up Dreaming"

Order	Team	Appeared as...	Performing...	Result
1	Nicole	Dolly Parton	"9 to 5"	Eliminated
1	Paulette	Dolly Parton	"9 to 5"	Eliminated
1	Cheri	Dolly Parton	"9 to 5"	Eliminated
2	Carrie	Dua Lipa	"Don't Start Now"	Eliminated
2	Olivia	Dua Lipa	"Don't Start Now"	Eliminated
2	Cassandra	Dua Lipa	"Don't Start Now"	Eliminated
3	Thom	Barry Gibb of the Bee Gees	"Stayin' Alive"	Eliminated
3	Jeff	Barry Gibb of the Bee Gees	"Stayin' Alive"	Eliminated
3	Andrew	Barry Gibb of the Bee Gees	"Stayin' Alive"	Eliminated
4	Gee	Sam Cooke	"A Change Is Gonna Come"	Through to the sing-off
4	Audley	Sam Cooke	"A Change Is Gonna Come"	Through to the sing-off
4	Lisanse	Sam Cooke	"A Change Is Gonna Come"	Through to the sing-off

Sing-off

Contestant	Performing...	Result
Gee	"Wonderful World"	Eliminated
Audley	"Wonderful World"	Eliminated
Lisanse	"Wonderful World"	Through to the final

=== Final (8 April) ===
- Guest performance: Olly Murs & The Starstruck Judges – "Praise You"

Order	Contestant	Appeared as...	Performing...
1	Callum	Ed Sheeran	"Castle on the Hill"
2	Esther-Olivia	Beyoncé	"Listen"
3	William	Meat Loaf	"You Took the Words Right Out of My Mouth"
4	Lisanse	Sam Cooke	"Twistin' the Night Away"
5	Abbie Edwards	Adele	"Someone like You"
6	Chris Tall	Sam Smith	"Promises"
7	Andrew	Frank Sinatra	"My Way"

== Ratings ==
Official ratings are taken from BARB.

Episode	Airdate	Official rating (millions)	Rank
1	12 February 2022	4.3	30
2	19 February 2022	3.7	41
3	26 February 2022	4.1	32
4	5 March 2022	4.1	24
5	12 March 2022	3.6	33
6	26 March 2022	3.4	32
7	2 April 2022	3.8	19

== International versions ==
Country	Local name	Channel	Host(s)	Judges	Seasons and winners	Ref.
Belgium (Flanders)	Starstruck	VTM	Laura Tesoro	Bart Kaëll; Nora Gharib; Nathalie Meskens; Guga Baúl	Season 1, 2023–24: Sonny Vande Putte as Freddie Mercury; Season 2, 2025: Upcoming series	
Belgium (Wallonia)	Starmaker, dans les pas d'une étoile	RTL-TVI	Sandrine Corman	Agustín Galiana; Anggun; Michaël Gregorio; Maria del Rio	Season 1, 2024: Manon Boyer as Billie Eilish	
Bulgaria	Звездите в нас Zvezdyte v nas	Nova TV	Maria Ignatova; Nencho Balabanov	Viktor Kalev; Sofi Marinova; Tita; Doni	Season 1, 2022: Antonia Markova as Tina Turner	
Chile	Starstruck	Canal 13	Sergio Lagos	José Alfredo Fuentes; Andrea Tessa; Tonka Tomicic; Álvaro Escobar	Season 1, 2022: Jorge Villagrán as Vicente Fernández	
Denmark	Stjerneklar	DR1	Joakim Ingversen	Medina; Barbara Moleko; Tinus; Nicholas Kawamura	Season 1, 2023: René Hejdmann as Kim Larsen	
Estonia	Täheks sündinud	Kanal 2	Jüri Butšakov	Stig Rästa; Elina Nechayeva; Peeter Oja; Synne Valtri	Season 1, 2025: Marek Tammets as Jaagup Kreemi	
Italy	Like a Star	Nove	Amadeus	Elio; Rosa Chemical; Serena Brancale	Season 1, 2025: Adolfo Durante as Mina	
Portugal	Superestrelas	RTP1	Sílvia Alberto	Pepê Rapazote; Jessica Athayde; Mimicat; Guest star	Season 1, 2024: Rúben Xavier as António Variações	
Russia	Ярче звёзд Yarche zvozd	TNT	Current; Timur Rodriguez (2-3); Former; Garik Martirosyan (1)	Daria Blokhina; Ivan Abramov; Marina Kravets; Alexey Chumakov	Season 1, 2023: Yana Vainovskaia as Polina Gagarina; Season 2, 2024: Dmitry Noskov as Frank Sinatra; Season 3, 2025: Simona Kuprina as Lady Gaga	
