= Sábado Al Mediodía =

Sábado Al Mediodía (Saturday at Noon), was a radio show hosted by Celines Toribio, Jimmy Nieves, Luis Velasco and later Birmania Rios. It was a variety and entertainment show that was the number-one-rated local Spanish TV program on Univision's New York affiliate, WXTV-41, from March 27, 1993 to June 30, 2001. Many Latino celebrities — Ricky Martin, Luis Miguel, Celia Cruz, Daddy Yankee, Shakira, Juanes — have appeared as guests.
