= Súper Sábado Sensacional =

- Created by: Amador Bendayan
- Directed by: Samuel Colina, Alexander López
- Presented by: Amador Bendayan (1972–1988); Gilberto Correa (1988–1996); Daniel Sarcos (1997–2009); Leonardo Villalobos (2010–2016); Henrys Silva (2016–present)
- Starring: Miriam Ochoa (1975-1986); Wilmer Ramirez (1992-1996, 2023-present); Milka Chulina (1993–1996); Daniel Sarcos (1996, 2023); Rashel Rodriguez (1997–2000); Viviana Gibelli (2000–2009); José Andrés Padrón (2016-2023); Fanny Otati (2011-2020); Nieves Soltedo (2022-present)
- Country of origin: Venezuela
- Original language: Spanish

Production
- Running time: 5 hours

Original release
- Network: Radio Caracas Television (1968–1970); Venevision (1970–present)
- Release: 1968 – present

Súper Sábado Sensacional (originally named Sábado Espectacular in 1968, renamed Sábado Sensacional in 1972) is a Spanish-language variety show created in Venezuela, and established on Radio Caracas Television in 1968. The show later moved to Venevisión network in 1970. Shown on a weekly basis, every Saturday from 12:00 pm to 5:00 pm (sometimes longer during special occasions) it is viewed internationally throughout Latin America and the United States and it is considered one of the highest rated television shows in the country. Throughout its run, there have been five major hosts: Amador Bendayán (1972–1988), Gilberto Correa (1988–1996), Daniel Sarcos (1997–2009), Leonardo Villalobos (2010–2016) and Henrys Silva (2016–2026).

== Overview ==
=== Broadcast history ===
Súper Sábado Sensacional ("Super Sensational Saturday") was originally established on RCTV as Sábado Espectacular ("Spectacular Saturday") in 1968. The show was later renamed Sábado Sensacional ("Sensational Saturday") by 1970, upon its arrival to Venevision. In 1990, "Súper" was added to the title, and is how the show is currently known today. In Venezuela, Súper Sábado Sensacional is broadcast for 5 hours, while in all other countries it is broadcast for either 2 hours.

In 1979, Amador Bendayan host of Sabado Sensacional was looking for an edge against Radio Caracas Television during rating sweeps. Enter International Production Coordinator Gary Mason. Mason worked with Producers Ricardo Pena, and Jorge Contreras to bring International Superstars Jerry Lewis, Herves Villachiaze, Ray Conniff, Paul Michael Glaser, R2 D2, John Travolta, The Bionic Dog, Mike Connors, Greg Morris, Farah Fawcett, Menudo with Ricky Martin and many others. Sabado Sensacional swept the ratings.

== Segments ==
=== Current Segments ===
- Yo Si Bailo Con Los Niños (2011)
- Bailando con los Abuelos (2008)
- Demuéstrame tu Amor (2010)
- Mega Dance (2012)
- Talentum (2013)
- El Show esta en la calle (2013–present)

=== Previous Segments ===
- Super 4 (mid-late 1990s)
- El Show del Dinero (late 1990s)
- Sábados Locos (1990-1997)
- Bailando con los mini pop (1991)
- Mega Match Sensacional/Mega Match(1996-2000)
- Guerra de los Sexos (2000-2009)
- El Momento de La Verdad (2001–2002)
- Generación S (2003-2016)
- Bailando Con Las Estrellas (2005-2019)
- El Precipicio Reforzado/Disparatado (2006–2013)
- Vale Todo Por Amor (2010)
- Quien Baila Mejor (2010)
- Yo Si Canto (2010-2012)
- Los Alquilinos (2012–2014)
- Recuerdo Sensacional (2014-2016)

=== Spin-offs ===
- Mega Match Sensacional (1996–2000 as SSS segment, 2002–2006 as its own show)

This segment consisted of national high school teams competing for minutes, not points, like other game shows, to later use them up for a special House of Prizes event. During this event, two students are picked from both schools to participate. Both stand face-to-face at a podium and the host asks them questions which they must answer to earn the minutes. If one contestant answers wrong or the other contestant answers correctly, that contestant gets pie smashed in the face. Later on, the winning contestant is given a large keyring with around 20 keys, and with it, the student has to open the eight locked doors in the two story house and complete certain tasks in each room; for example, hanging a picture frame on a wall or searching for a lost pair of shoes in a room filled with shoe boxes to obtain additional prizes. The student is given the time that his team has won during the game. If the student completes all tasks before time runs out, he or she will win 30 million Venezuelan bolívars (30,000 bolívares fuertes, around $15,000) in prizes, including a new car. The money eventually goes to the school and not just the contestant who participated in the event. Mega Match spun off as its own show in 1999 and went off the air in 2006. This segment also marked the beginning of Daniel Sarcos' involvement with Súper Sábado Sensacional in 1996 before becoming the show's main host in early 1997.

- La Guerra de Los Sexos (2000–2009 as SSS segment, 2009–present as its own show)

Hosted by Daniel Sarcos (later replaced by Winston Vallenilla in 2010) and Viviana Gibelli, three male celebrities compete against three female celebrities in this segment through numerous games to earn points. This segment gained popularity that it started broadcasting separately throughout the 2000s and eventually spun off as an independent show in early 2009. Executive producer Ricardo Peña was the show's announcer and head judge until his death in 2009.

=== On-air Talent ===
Main Host

- Amador Bendayan (1972–1988)
- Gilberto Correa (1972–1996)
- Daniel Sarcos (1996–2009, 2023)
- Leonardo Villalobos (2005–2016)
- Henrys Silva (2011–present)

Co-Host

- Miriam Ochoa (1975-1986)
- Wilmer Ramirez (1992-1996, 2023-present)
- Milka Chulina (1993–1996)
- Daniel Sarcos (1996, Mega Match segment)
- Rashel Rodriguez (1997–2000, Mega Match segment)
- Viviana Gibelli (2000–2009 Guerra de Los Sexos segment)
- Fanny Otati (2016-2020)
- José Andrés Padrón (2016-2023)
- Nieves Soltedo (2022-present)

== Transitions ==
=== Bendayan to Correa (1988) ===
The original Sábado Sensacional logo.

The heavy schedule of a long running variety television show took its toll on Amador Bendayan's health at the end of the 1970s and throughout the 1980s. His abuse of cigarettes and his struggle with diabetes mellitus made it sometimes impossible to please his audience, forcing him to rest down, with his absence being covered by other hosts, including model and actress Miriam Ochoa, César González ("el amigo de todos" - "Everybody's friend"), journalist and broadcaster Napoleón Bravo and Gilberto Correa, who at the time was the host of another successful Venevision show "De Fiesta Con Venevisión" (and would eventually take over as permanent host of SSS until 1996). Meanwhile, people were patient enough to wait for Bendayan's constant returns, welcoming him with the now memorable slogan of "Ánimo Amador!" ("Cheer up, Amador!") which later became a stample of the show during the entire decade.

The Súper Sábado Sensacional logo from the early 1990s.

Bendayan's wish for a better respect to artists around the country was fulfilled in 1985, when he hosted an event celebrating his idea of La Casa del Artista (The Artist's House, which was inaugurated officially in late 1988). But despite his efforts, Amador's health was rapidly deteriorating by this time and was forced to retire completely from the show, while the audience still watched his show and the many musical performers would sign a flipchart pleading for his return.

In late July 1989, agonizing in his deathbed, Bendayan made producer Ricardo Peña write a letter as a farewell message to Venezuela and his wish to continue producing the show with Gilberto Correa, who was in charge of reading Bendayan's last will on a special aired the day after he died, on August 4, 1989.

Amador Bendayan's death was a hard blow on everyone who worked or participated on the show, particularly on Ricardo Peña. Despite the grief, the show kept on with new host Gilberto Correa and co-host Milka Chulina, generating higher ratings and focusing even more on multitudinary events, like state fairs (i.e. Feria de San Sebastian), the Super Bingo de la Bondad, and the Festival de la Orquidea (an event founded by Bendayan in 1982, to celebrate the Maracaibo Chiquinquira Fair).

=== Correa to Sarcos (1996-97) ===
The logo used when Daniel Sarcos took over as host in 1997. A 2-dimensional version was used during Correa's final season, and for a brief period during Sarcos's tenure.

Daniel Sarcos's youthful energy caught the eye of Gilberto Correa, who at the time saw his own inevitable retire that same year. Sarcos started in 1996 by covering the "Mega Match Sensacional" segment for his first year on the show, while Correa was hosting in the main studio. Sarcos later took over as permanent host during a Feria de San Sebastian edition of the show, which took place on January 18, 1997. Shortly after, the stage received a huge makeover. One of the best known segments on the show was La Guerra De Los Sexos, introduced in 2000, later becoming its own show in early 2009. The talent show segment, "El Precipicio Reforzado" was added in 2006, featuring a jury of three people dressed like Juan Gabriel (played by El Moreno Michael), El Chacal (from Sabado Gigante), Alejandro Corona (later dropped in 2007), Doña Gumersinda, Don Francisco, etc. This segment was renamed "El Precipicio Disparatado" in 2011. They have many other new segments covering many slots of the show's duration, generating criticism amongst its viewers. Despite this, Súper Sábado Sensacional still goes strong over 40 years on air, maintaining its place as one of the longest running variety shows in Latin America.

A tribute was made to Amador Bendayan for the 20th anniversary of his death. Former host Gilberto Correa, as well as many other previous guests of Súper Sábado Sensacional all returned to participate in the tribute. The original Sábado Sensacional theme song was used for the intro of this episode.

Nearly two months after the airing of Bendayan's tribute, executive producer Ricardo Peña died in his home of natural causes. On Saturday of that week, Daniel Sarcos, along with nearly all of Venevision's employees paid tribute to Peña during that airing of Súper Sábado Sensacional. Peña served as executive producer on the show since 1977.

=== Sarcos to Villalobos (2010-16) ===
The SSS logo used from 2008 to 2012, during the latter part of Sarcos' tenure and the start of Villalobos' tenure.

The SSS logo used from 2013 to 2020, used during Villalobos' tenure.

Sarcos later signed a contract with a network in Ecuador. Venevision got deeper into details with the situation, and by January 2010, Sarcos finally admitted that he has signed a contract with Ecuavisa, and was willing to still continue with Venevision, but production executives did not allow it. His contract with Venevision expired, and Sarcos left Súper Sábado Sensacional. On February 13, 2010, entertainer Leonardo Villalobos debuted as host of Súper Sábado Sensacional, following his departure from his previous show, Portada's. On August 25, 2012, Venevision would suspend production of the program due to the events related to the Amuay Tragedy. In 2013, the program would celebrate its 40th anniversary, featuring appearances from Mariángel Ruiz and Viviana Gibelli to present some of the program's specials or contests.

=== Villalobos to Silva (2016-present) ===
After seven years hosting the program, Leonardo Villalobos left Super Sabado Sensacional in 2016, due to outside commitments in the Dominican Republic. On August 1, Venevision named Henrys Silva and new co-host Fanny Ottati were hired as the new hosts of Super Sabado Sensacional, starting on August 6, 2016. Jose Andres Padron would also join the program as a co-host that year. During this period, he program's format focused only on events, contests, and presentations of Venezuelan artists, due to Venezuela's economic crisis at the time. In March 2020, due to the COVID-19 pandemic, Venevision halted production of SSS and rebroadcasting prior episodes during that period. Otati would depart from the program that year. SSS resumed production on May 7, 2022, hosted by Silva and Padron. A new co-host, Nieves Soltedo would join the program as of the May 20, 2022 edition. In June 2023, Padron would later leave the program in to host Portadas. On June 4, 2023, Venevisión and the Mayor's Office of Maracaibo confirmed the return La Festival del Orquidea (Orchid Festival) after a ten-year absence. Daniel Sarcos would return to the program as a special MC at the Festival. Wilmer Ramirez also returned to the program to replace Padron as SSS co-host. He previously hosted segments from 1992-1996.

== Notable guests ==
Many guests on the show include: Don Francisco, Cristina Saralegui, Jackson 5, John Travolta, Olivia Newton-John, Ray Conniff, Farrah Fawcett, Lee Majors, Jerry Lewis, Al Corley, Pia Zadora, Robert Urich, Iris Chacon, Shakira, Mana, Jerry Rivera, Mirla Castellanos, Los Adolescentes, Salserin, Servando and Florentino, Thalía, Juanes, Chayanne, Billo Frometa, Isabel Pantoja, Eros Ramazzotti, Emmanuel, Rocío Dúrcal, Soledad Pastorutti, Ricardo Montaner, Luis Fonsi, Lila Morillo, Lola Flores, Mario Suarez, Nelson Ned, David Bisbal, Simon Diaz, Pecos Kanvas, Gilberto Santa Rosa, Willie Colón, Alejandro Fernández, Ruben Blades, El Moreno Michael, Raphael, Kudai, Paulina Rubio, Pablo Montero, Oscar D'León, Celia Cruz, Juan Gabriel, Olga Tañon, Wisin & Yandel, Rakim y Ken Y, Tony Dize, Fey, Nelson de la Rosa, Jorge Celedon, Chino & Nacho, Tito El Bambino, Don Omar, Calle Ciega, Los Cadillac, Pandora Peaks, Elvis Crespo, Alyz Henrich as well as many more.

== Theme music ==
While the original theme for the show's broadcast on RCTV is unknown, the first theme used on Venevision's broadcast was called "Sábado Sensacional" and was composed by Arnoldo Nali. In 1990, a new theme with new lyrics was used for the show's opening, though the previous theme was still used for when the host was introduced. This theme was re-arranged again in 1996 for Gilberto Correa's final season and would be used for the majority of Daniel Sarcos's run until 2008. In 2009 (the final year with Sarcos as host), the show debuted a new theme composed by Miguel Mardeni and Eli Cordero and was used until SSS's production was halted in 2020. When the program resumed production in 2022, SSS returned to the theme composed by Nali. All previous theme songs are still used often during special editions of Súper Sábado Sensacional, though the intact versions have not been released due to Venevision's current copyright regulations.

== Venevision's 50th anniversary celebration ==
Súper Sábado Sensacional was one of the shows that celebrated Venevision's 50th anniversary. Throughout various recent episodes, Súper Sábado Sensacional showed numerous retrospective clips of previous episodes, as well as a tribute to the late Ricardo Peña. Gilberto Correa returned to the show once again to co-host a special episode alongside former host Leonardo Villalobos. Daniel Sarcos was slated to return as well, but declined. Sarcos would return in 2022 to celebrate Super Sabado Sensacional's 50th anniversary.
