= Para Innocens =

Studio album by Daniel Sarcos and other artists
- Released: 1998
- Genre: Salsa
- Producer: Ricardo Montaner

Singles from Para Innocens
- 1. "Ella"; 2. "Lloras"

Para Innocens is a CD project made by Daniel Sarcos in 1998 for Fundacion Innocens, a charity made to raise awareness for children who have HIV. The album includes two songs recorded by Sarcos, as well as songs from the artists Servando & Florentino, Nelson Arrieta, Pasion Juvenil, Dimension Latina, Guaco, Saned Rivera, Tito Rojas, Oscar D'Leon, La India, and Salserin.

== Track listing ==
| No. | Title | Length |
|---|---|---|
| 1. | "Lloras" | 4:33 |
| 2. | "Tengo Un Corazon" |
| 3. | "Te Llevo Grabada En Mi Piel" |
| 4. | "Con La Mirada En El Cielo" |
| 5. | "Amor Perdoname" |
| 6. | "Deshonestidad" |
| 7. | "Rompamos El Hielo" |
| 8. | "Señora" |
| 9. | "Mujer De Arena" |
| 10. | "Me Cansé De Ser La Otra" |
| 11. | "Miraré Para Arriba" |
| 12. | "Ella" | 3:58 |
