= Jimmy Nievez =

Puerto Rican disc jockey

Jimmy Nievez (born 1969) is a Puerto Rican disc jockey and program director of New York City, Boston, and San Juan, Puerto Rico. Nievez serves as the program director for the Uno Radio Group's Fidelity and SalSoul radio stations.

== Early life ==
He was born in the Spanish Harlem neighborhood of New York City to Puerto Rican parents. At the age of ten, Jimmy's family moved to Puerto Rico where he grew up and lived most of his youth years.

At age 14, he started working at different radio stations in the southern coast of Puerto Rico. He worked as a producer, board operator, and DJ. He worked as the Program Director of WENA, in Yauco, Puerto Rico. His experience at WENA contributed to his success at Uno Radio Group. He hosted his first morning show on WRIO FM in Ponce City.

== Career ==
His career started in the mid-1980s. After several years of disc jockeying in numerous radio stations, Nieves became one of the original disc jockeys of Cosmos 94 FM, Tu Emisora Radioactiva.

In 1998, Jimmy was offered the opportunity to be part of a new radio station in New York, Caliente 105.9. Nieves was co-host of "La Jungla De New York" (The New York Jungle), alongside Danny Cruz.

In New York City, he co-hosted a variety and entertainment show called "Sabado Al Mediodia" (Saturday at Midday), which became the top rated local Spanish television program on Univision's New York affiliate, WXTV-41.

He returned to Puerto Rico to work again with Danny Cruz on La Perrera (The Dog House), an afternoon drive talk show on Cadena Salsoul.

Nieves then moved back to New York, hosting El Jangueo (Hanging) at WCAA.

He currently serves as the director of Uno Radio Group.

== Appearances, interviews, and awards ==
He has been interviewed on television shows such as "Despierta America" (Univision) and "Escandalo TV" (Telefutura), and has also appeared in local Latino events such as the Puerto Rican Day Parade and Dominican Day Parade.

He has interviewed many Latino celebrities and personalities including Ricky Martin, Juanes, Celia Cruz, Rubén Blades, Alejandro Fernández, Shakira, and Daddy Yankee.

== See also ==
- El Jangueo
- List of Puerto Ricans
