= Jesús de Alva =

Venezuelan model and television personality

Jesús de Alva Tirado
- Born: Jesús Alvarado; 1 September 1993 (age 32); Zulia, Venezuela
- Occupations: Model, Presenter
- Height: 1.80 m (5 ft 11 in)
- Title: Mister Grand Venezuela 2018

Jesús de Alva (born Jesús Alvarado in Maracaibo) is a Venezuelan model and television personality who rose to fame after participating in the 2014 Mister Venezuela competition.

== Career ==
On August 30, 2018, he is named by the organization The Super Model Venezuela as the first Mister Grand Venezuela, that same year. Jesús was a student in his 5th semester at Universidad Rafael Belloso Chacín where he was studying Social Communication. He decided to participate in the 2014 Mister Venezuela competition. where he emerged as a semi-finalist. After the competition, he was cast as a host for the popular magazine show Portada's that airs on Venevisión.

In 2016, he released a line of Men's clothing designed by Oswaldo Escalante
