= El Jangueo =

El Jangueo (Hanging) was a radio morning talk show. It was hosted by entertainers Jimmy Nieves and Frederick Martinez, or "El Pacha". "El Jangueo" aired on La Kalle 105.9 FM, New York's official Reggaeton (now Tropical since 2007) station. The show is no longer on the air.

Some of their comments could be seen to include bigoted and misogynistic remarks about various religious groups and genders.

Many Latino celebrities and personalities have appeared as a guest on the show. The show was broadcast from 3:00 to 7:00 p.m. when first launched on Latino Mix 105.9, and became the number one Spanish show, dominating one of the most significant demographics (18-34 Arbitron). The show changed to the morning 6:00 to 10:00 am slot after Latino Mix switched format to La Kalle 105.9.
