= Tony MacFarland =

Mexican actor and show host

Tony MacFarland (born Antonio José MacFarland) is a Mexican actor and show host, who made his first appearance in television in the Mexican edition of the reality show Big Brother.

In 2003, he participated in the film Sexos prósperos, directed by Matha Luna, alongside Julio Bracho and Consuelo Duval. He has also appeared in some television commercials. He also hosted Día de perros, alongside Vanessa Aguilar and Renato Bartilotti.

He is currently an administrator of a night club in his native city, called "Bios".
