= Naoko Shimazu =

Japanese history professor

Naoko Shimazu FRHistS is Professor of History in the Tokyo College at the University of Tokyo. She was previously Professor of Humanities (History) at Yale-NUS College, Professor of History at Birkbeck College, University of London, and Fernand Braudel fellow at the European University Institute. She is a Non-resident Long-term Fellow for Programmes on Modern History and International Relations at the Swedish Collegium for Advanced Study in Uppsala, Sweden.

== Research ==
Shimazu is a fellow of the Royal Historical Society.

== Education ==
Shimazu has the following degrees:

- 1995 D.Phil. in international relations, University of Oxford
- 1985 B.A.(Honours) in political studies, University of Manitoba
- 1987 M.Phil. in international relations, University of Oxford

== Selected publications ==
- Cold War Asia: A Visual History of Global Diplomacy (edited with Matthew Phillips, Cambridge University Press, forthcoming 2023). Editor and author.
- Oxford Handbook on the Cultural History of Global Diplomacy, c.1750-2000 (Editor with Christian Goeschel, contracted, forthcoming 2024). Editor and author.
- The Russian Revolution in Asia: From Baku to Batavia (edited with Sabine Dullin, Etienne Forestier-Peyrat, Yuexin Rachel Lin), (London: Routledge, 2022). Editor and co-author.
- Postcard Impressions from Early 20th Century Singapore: Perspective from the Japanese Community, co-authored with Regina Hong and Ling Xi Min (Singapore: National Library Board, 2020). Co-author.
- Imagining Japan in Postwar East Asia. Routledge, London, 2013. (Co-editor with Paul Morris and Edward Vickers)
- Japanese Society at War: Death, Memory, and the Russo-Japanese War. Cambridge University Press, Cambridge, 2009.
- Nationalisms in Japan. Routledge, London, 2006. (editor)
- Japan, Race and Equality: The Racial Equality Proposal of 1919. Routledge, London, 1998.
