= Daniel Sarcos =

Venezuelan television personality

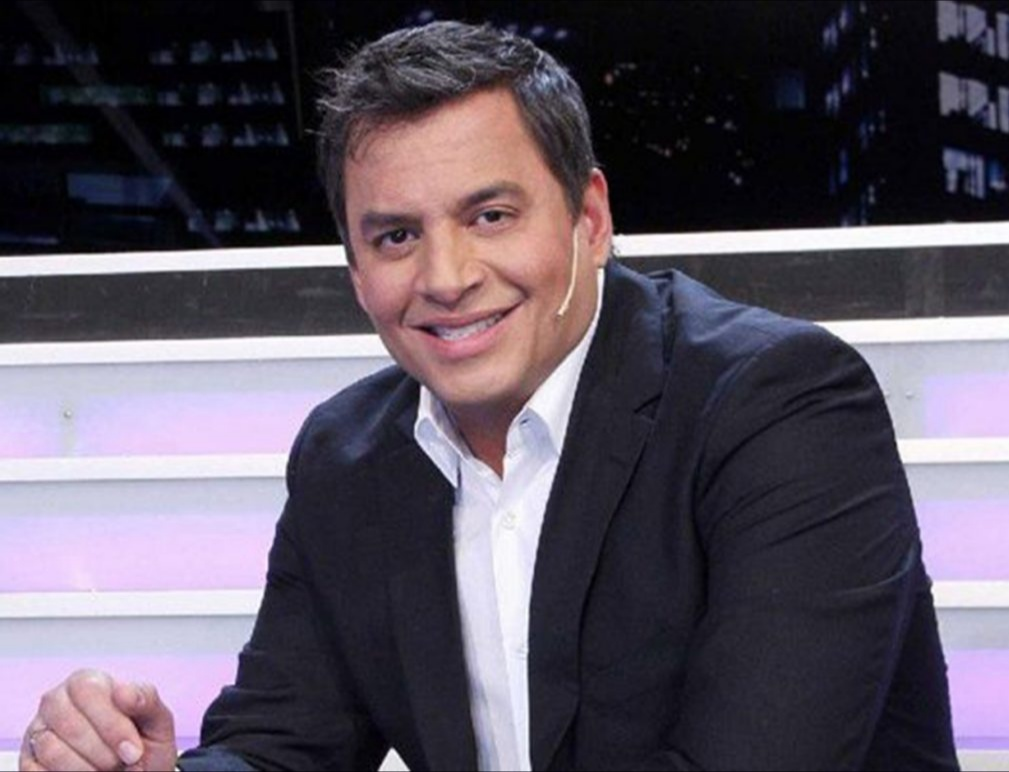
- Born: Daniel Enrique Sarcos Cabrera; 29 September 1967 (age 59); Caracas, Venezuela
- Occupation: Television personality
- Years active: 1994–present
- Spouse(s): Carol Zavaleta (m. 1998; div. 2003) Chiquinquira Delgado (m. 2003; div. 2010)
- Partner: Alessandra Villegas (2012–2023)
- Children: 3

Daniel Enrique Sarcos Cabrera (born 29 September 1967) is a Venezuelan actor, stand-up comedian, and television personality best known as the host of Súper Sábado Sensacional from 1997 to 2009, and the Miss Venezuela pageant from 2004 to 2009. Both of these shows were broadcast on the Venezuelan television channel, Venevisión. From 2011 to 2018 he also hosted the morning program Un Nuevo Día (formerly named ¡Levántate!) on the Telemundo Television network.

== Television career ==
Sarcos began his television career when he hosted the variety show Frecuencia Latina on Venezolana de Televisión in 1994. In 1996, Sarcos was hired by Venevisión to host the Mega Match Sensacional, a new segment on the variety show Súper Sábado Sensacional. In January 1997, Sarcos took over as the show's main host before being replaced by Leonardo Villalobos in 2010. Beginning in 2000, he also starred in La Guerra De Los Sexos, another segment from Súper Sábado Sensacional (co-hosting with Viviana Gibelli) until his 2009 departure. Sarcos starred in the Dominican Movie, Un Macho De Mujer in 2006. He later hosted El Gran Navegante, which ran from 2007 to 2008. After he departed from Súper Sábado Sensacional, he hosted El Familión Nestlé: Trato Hecho (Spanish-language version of Deal or No Deal) which airs on Ecuavisa and is sponsored by Nestlé. Following this, he was allowed to host the Miss Ecuador pageant on 25 March 2010. In February 2011, Sarcos became the host of the morning program ¡Levántate!, now known as Un Nuevo Día, which airs on Telemundo. Sarcos is also the host of Aqui Se Habla Espanol which airs on Antena Latina, Dominican Republic. On 23 February 2020, Sarcos started hosting La Guerra de los Sexos in the Dominican Republic.

== Singing career ==
Sarcos is also a salsa singer. Two of his songs are featured in the CD Para Innocens, which was released in 1998.

== Personal life ==
From 2003 until 2010, Sarcos was married to his second wife, former Miss Venezuela contestant, model, and television host Chiquinquirá Delgado, with whom he has a daughter.

== Filmography ==
=== Television ===
- Frecuencia Latina (1994–1995)
- Súper Sábado Sensacional (1996–2023)
- La Guerra de Los Sexos (2000–2009, 2020–2021)
- Anda Pa'l Cará (2004)
- El Gran Navegante (2007–2009)
- El Familion Nestle: Trato Hecho (2010–2011)
- Aqui Se Habla Español (2010-2020)
- Un Nuevo Día (formerly ¡Levántate!) (2011–2018)
- Cobra Kai (Season 5 - 2022, guest appearance)

=== Stage ===
- Mi Vida No Es Tan Sensacional (2009–2010)
- ¿Divorciarme, Yo? (2011–present)

== See also ==
- List of television presenters/Venezuela

Media offices
| Preceded by Gilberto Correa; 1988–1996 | Host of Súper Sábado Sensacional; 1997–2009 | Succeeded by Leonardo Villalobos; 2010–2016 |
