= Frederick Zammit =

Maltese television executive

Frederick Zammit is a television scriptwriter, presenter and executive from Malta. He has acted as Head of Programmes for Net TV and is the writer of Malta's most popular TV series Santa Monika, which was screened between October 2005 and March 2006. The second series has been aired from October 2006, with a third scheduled for October 2007. A cinema version of the show was produced in 2009. He also wrote the drama series F’Salib it-Toroq.

Zammit has served as a member of the Public Broadcasting Services selection panel for the Maltese Eurovision Song Contest entry and as host of the accompanying Lejn il-Eurovision show.
