= Portadas al Día =

- Genre: News magazine Interview; Talk show
- Directed by: Douglas Quintana
- Creative director: Julio Iglesias
- Theme music composer: Santiago Cabriles
- Country of origin: Venezuela
- Original language: Spanish

Production
- Executive producers: Patricia Chung; Marileila Fernández
- Producers: Celiné Mariño; Naylis Sánchez
- Cinematography: Gustavo Montenegro
- Running time: 180 minutes (including commercials)

Original release
- Network: Venevisión
- Release: February 9, 2005 – present

Portadas al Día (before Portada's) is a Venezuelan Spanish language show produced by and broadcast live by Venevisión. The show is aired Monday to Friday from 9:00 am to noon and follows a News magazine format and addressees a variety of topics covering family life from national to international events. The show's segments offer a variety of entertainment featuring food, gossip, games, humor, celebrity interviews and more.

== History ==
Portada's began in 2005 with Leonardo Villalobos, Chiquinquirá Delgado, Francisco León, Mariangel Ruiz and Zoraya Villarreal as the show's first presenters.

In 2014, the show celebrated its 9th anniversary being on air.

On June 26, 2023, the magazine was renamed Portadas al Día, changing the recording studio and with it the dynamics of the program.

== Presenters ==
- Lead Animator
- Co-animator/ Panelist
- Guest entertainer
- Special guest

Host	Year																				
Host	2000s					2010s										2020s					
Host	05	26	07	08	09	10	11	12	13	14	15	16	17	18	19	20	21	22	23	24	25
Mariángel Ruiz																					
Mariela Celis																					
Gesaria Lapietra																					
Isabella Rodríguez																					
José Andrés Padrón																					
Leo Aldana																					
Mario Bruno																					
Génesis Quintero																					
Former
Chiquinquirá Delgado																					
Francisco León																					
Zoraya Villarreal																					
Leonardo Villalobos																					
Rafael "El Pollo" Brito																					
Carolina Indriago																					
Michelle Badillo																					
Osmariel Villalobos																					
Kerly Ruiz																					
Jesús de Alva																					
Georges Biloune																					
Jordan Mendoza																					
Henrys Silva																					
Marie Claire Harp																					
Ange Unda																					
Dave Capella †																					
Alejandro Zumbo																					
Natalia Monasterios																					
Alessandra Sánchez																					
