= Satoshi Hatakeyama =

Japanese journalist (born 1958)

- 畠山 智之
- Born: October 30, 1958 (age 67); Japan
- Occupation: Journalist

Satoshi Hatakeyama (畠山 智之, Hatakeyama Satoshi; born October 30, 1958) is a Japanese journalist who works for NHK. During his career, he was presenter of NHK News 7 and NHK News 21.

== Career ==
Hatakeyama was born in Osaka and later raised in Tokyo. After graduating from The Second Junior and Senior High School of Nihon University, he entered Nihon University's Department of Agriculture and Veterinary Medicine, now Department of Bioresource Sciences, studying food engineering.

During his college years, he did not aspire to be an announcer, nor did he study announcing at all. However, he had always wanted to work abroad, and in his fourth year of college he took an entrance exam for a trading company, though was rejected. Still, his desire to work overseas remained unchanged, and when looking at job postings for places with overseas branches, he found a bulletin for NHK staff recruitment. As a result, he was hired as an announcer, graduating from university in April 1981.
