= Masao Sueda =

Japanese journalist and newscaster (born 1951)

- 末田 正雄
- Born: July 18, 1951 (age 74); Hiroshima, Japan
- Occupations: Journalist, newscaster

Masao Sueda (末田 正雄, Sueda Masao; born July 18, 1951 in Kure, Hiroshima) is a Japanese journalist and newscaster, who works for NHK Radio 1.

Sueda was a presenter on the Ohayo Nippon morning show between 2000 and 2003, presented the Ogenki desu ka Nippon Retto afternoon program between 2004 and 2005, and was the weekend presenter on NHK News 7. As of December 2012, he presents the radio program Watashi mo Hitokoto! Yūgata Nyūsu (私も一言！夕方ニュース).
