= Pablo de Madalengoitia =

Peruvian journalist

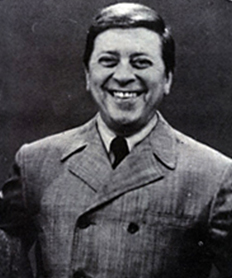
Pablo de Madalengoitia in 1969

Pablo de Madalengoitia y Aubry (11 May 1919 – 24 May 1999) was a Peruvian television host.

== Programs ==
- La pregunta de los 500 mil reales (1960–1962)
- Pablo y sus amigos (1961–1962)
- Scala regala (1960)
- Esta es su vida (1965)
- Cancionísima (1967–1968)
- Este es su día (1966–1967)
- El clan del 4 (1968)
- Helen Curtis pregunta por 64 mil soles (1969)
- Lo que vale el saber (1977)
- Usted es el juez (1968–1969)
- Especiales musicales (1979)
- 24 horas (1980)
- La pregunta de los 10 millones (1982)
- La pregunta de los 25 millones (1984)
- Bienvenida la música (1987)
- Agenda personal (1988)
- Los especiales de Panamericana (1991–1996)
- Magazine (1981, 1991)
