= Cary Oliver =

Cuban-Puerto Rican actress and show host

- Born: Havana, Cuba
- Occupations: Television and film actress, show host, television journalist

Cary Oliver (born on a December 23 in Havana, Cuba) is a Cuban–Puerto Rican film and television actress and show host.

As of 2022, Oliver was also working as a professional pet groomer in Puerto Rico.

At one point during her show business career, Oliver was also a television journalist, at WAPA-TV's "Noticentro 4" news show.

== Career ==
Oliver debuted as an actress in her native Cuba. She was a television actress in that Caribbean country. Oliver acted in telenovelas and in theater in Cuba.

Oliver moved from Cuba to New York City. In the United States, she worked in Spanish television and acted in a film named "Popa". She was known by Hispanic audiences in the USA as "Tia Palunga" ("Aunt Palunga"). That film was a major success among Hispanic audiences in New York City and it spanned a television series which was shown on that city's Spanish channel 47; Oliver reprised her character as "Tia Palunga" on the show.

Later on, in 1970, Oliver moved to Puerto Rico. Her television debut in her new country occurred when she was cast to participate in Canal 4's telenovela, "Gabriela y Belinda", where she shared acting credits with Camille Carrion and with singer Rosita Peru, among others.

Around this time, producer Guillermo de Cun hired Oliver to participate in some of his comedies, while Oliver also got signed as a children's show's host. She became known to the pre-teen audiences in Puerto Rico for her participations in "La Hora de la Aventura" ("Hour of Adventures", as "Agente Z"), "Marvel Super Heroes" and "Un Rayo de Sol" ("A Ray of Light").

Oliver relived her "Tia Palunga" character on Puerto Rican television. In 1974, she was hired by Luis Vigoreaux to participate in his game show, "Pa' rriba, Papi, Pa' rriba!".

During the late 1970s and early 1980s, Oliver was involved in some of Puerto Rico's most successful television shows, including "El Show de Charytín" alongside Charytín Goyco, "Los Suegros" ("The In-Laws") with Luis Antonio Rivera and Rosaura Andreu, "Fantastico" and others.

Oliver moved on to canal 2, where she participated in the Puerto Rican sitcom "Wilson, Wilson", which was a hit in the 1990s. She played "Fica" there and was also involved in radio hosting with a show named "Aquí es Con Cary Oliver" ("Here it is With Cary Oliver") which was transmitted from Radio Aeropuerto, a station near Luis Munoz Marin International Airport in Carolina. Later during the decade of the 1990s, Oliver produced a travel show on the Christian television network, canal 64, and then, in 1999, she joined the children's television show, "Telecomicas" (along Sandra Zaiter, Lou Briel and Dagmar Rivera, among others), which was shown on canal 2. Oliver hosted a section about animals on the latter program.

Oliver returned to theater acting during the 2000s, participating in, among others, 2004's "La Despedida de la Nena" ("The Girl's Goodbye"), 2005's "La Nena lo Tiene Tumbao'!" ("The Girl has Him Falling Over For Her!") where she acted alongside William Levy, and "Las Chismosas!....mi Hijo es Gay!" ("Those Tale Tellers! My Son is Gay!").

== See also ==
- List of Cubans
- List of Puerto Ricans
