= Norio Ishizawa =

Japanese journalist and newscaster (born 1952)

- Born: Ishizawa Norio; August 16, 1952 (age 73); Yokohama, Japan
- Occupation: Journalist

Norio Ishizawa (石澤 典夫 Ishizawa Norio, born August 16, 1952, in Yokohama) is a Japanese journalist and newscaster, currently working for NHK.

During his career, Ishiwaza was presenter of the morning news program NHK Morning Wide (Saturdays 1989–90), NHK News 9 (1993–95), Ohayo Nippon (1995–96) and NHK News 7 (weekends 2000–2002).
