= Soledad Solaro =

Argentine model and television personality

- Born: Soledad Solaro Maxwell; October 24, 1978 (age 47); Realicó, La Pampa, Argentina
- Years active: 1994-present
- Website: www.solesolaro.com.ar

Soledad Solaro Maxwell (Spanish pronunciation: [soleˈðað soˈlaɾo]; October 24, 1978 in Realicó, La Pampa) is an Argentine model and television personality.

== Career ==
Soledad Solaro started her modeling career aged 16. She was the finalist of the Scouting Dotto Models concourse. Solaro moved to Buenos Aires due to her career, and has since worked with various popular Argentine designers, such as Laurencio Adot, Nina Ricci, Marcelo Senra, Mariano Toledo, Maureen Dinar, Iara and Fabián Kronenberg, among others.

Solaro made her debut on television in 1998, being host of the program Break Point; she was then the host of Promax Awards in 2002. Her own television show, My Carnal, started in 2000. It is currently being aired on the Fashion TV. In 2007, she appeared on the fourth season of Bailando por un sueño.

== Designers represented ==
- Laurencio Adot
- Nina Ricci
- Marcelo Senra
- Mariano Toledo
- Maureen Dinar
- Iara
- Fabián Kronenberg

== Television ==
- 1998: Break Point
- 2000—present: My Carnal
