= Liz Evora =

Cuban-born American journalist

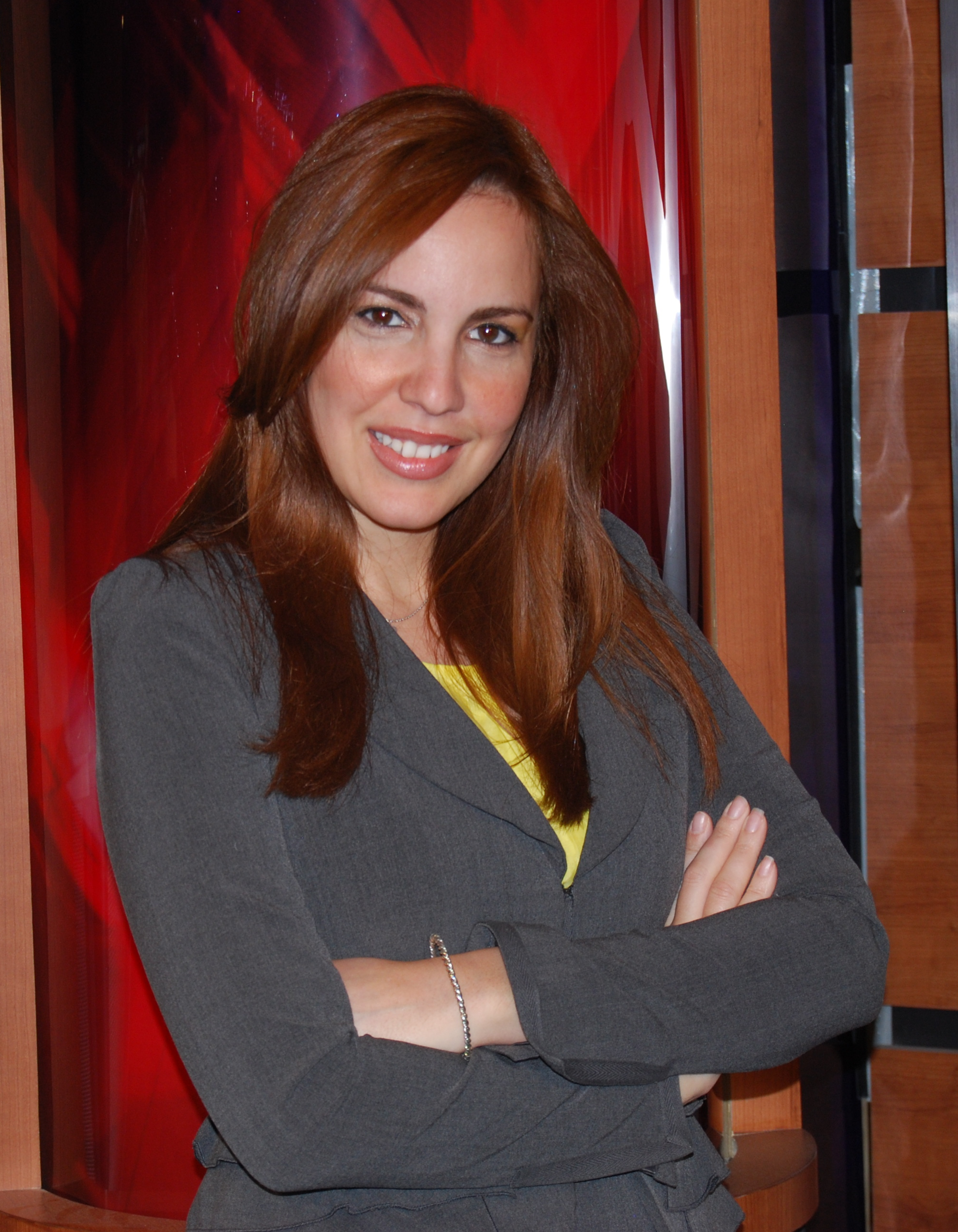
- Evora in December 2010
- Born: Havana, Cuba
- Other name: Lizzy
- Education: University of Miami
- Occupation: Journalist

Liz Evora (born November 30) is a Cuban-born naturalized American broadcast journalist. She is currently a news reporter and producer for InfoMás.

== Early life and education ==
Evora began her career in Havana, Cuba, as a child, starring in theatre plays. In 2003, she moved with her family to the United States.

In 2006, Evora attended Miami Dade College in Miami, United States, studying mass communication. A year later, she transferred to the University of Miami, where she graduated in 2010 with a bachelor's degree in broadcast journalism and political science and a minor in communication studies. At "The U," she anchored and reported for the University of Miami's Spanish news magazine, UniMiami and interned with Univision 23, WLTV-DT, where she helped cover news on crime, education, immigration, politics, and the 2010 World Cup.

== Career ==
=== Television news ===
In 2010, Evora joined Telemundo Amarillo, where she serves as anchor and producer of the 5pm daily newscast.

In the Spring of 2011, she moved to Tampa, Florida, where she worked as a reporter for Bay News 9 in Español, a fast-paced 24 hours news cable channel. A few months later, she became a reporter for the new regional channel InfoMás following the merger of Bay News 9 en Español and Central Florida News en Español. During that time, she contributed reports for the weekday newscasts and produce for the weekend editions and covered stories such as the Republican convention in Tampa and the last presidential debate in Boca Raton. In 2012, she produced a documentary about Cuban society for the first anniversary of the station.

=== Other work ===
In English, she produced and directed The Greatest Commodity in the World..., a short documentary film on one of Miami's marginalized neighborhoods, Overtown, revealing the frustration and ill-feelings of the residents towards media coverage of that area.

=== Documentaries ===
- The Greatest Commodity in the World... (2010), short documentary of Miami's Overtown
- Cuba, de Regreso a Casa (2012), documentary about Cuban society
