= Xosé Castro Roig =

Galician translator and television presenter (born 1968)

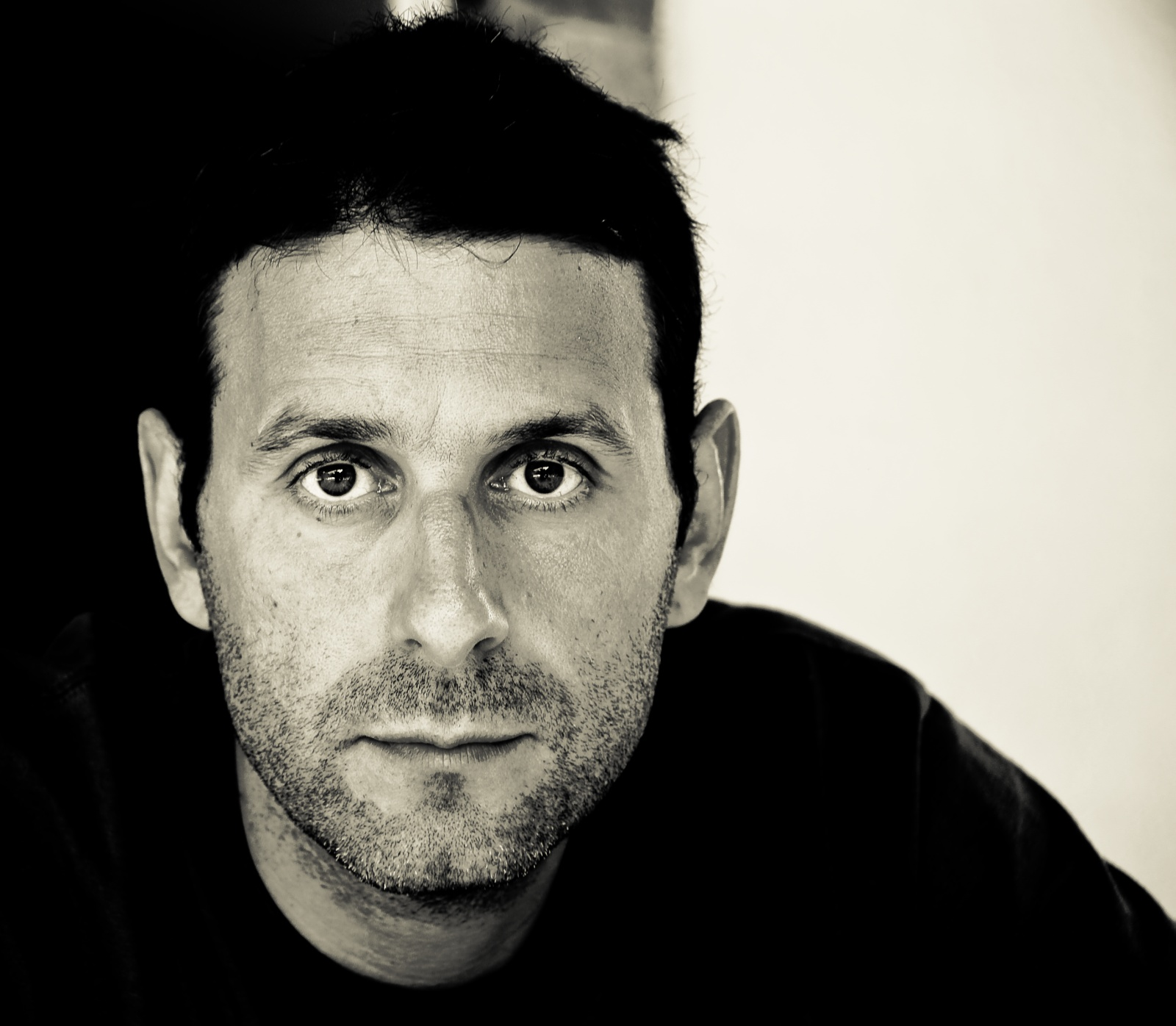
- Xosé Castro Roig in 2009
- Born: November 19, 1968 (age 57); A Coruña, Galicia
- Occupation: Journalist

Xosé Castro Roig (born 19 November 1968 in A Coruña, Galicia, Spain) is a Galician translator and television presenter.

An autodidact, he specialized as an English-Spanish audiovisual and software translator.

He has collaborated with ElCastellano.org, a webpage for Spanish language. He is a member of the editorial staff of the medical translation magazine Panacea.

He is also a popular TV presenter, he entertains in language matters at Palabra por palabra.
