= Jorge Zarza =

Mexican journalist and news anchor

- Born: November 22, 1970 (age 54); Cuernavaca, Morelos, Mexico
- Occupation(s): Journalist and news anchor

Jorge Alfonso Zarza Pineda (born 22 November 1970 in Cuernavaca) is a Mexican journalist and news anchor, who anchors Hechos AM, which is Azteca 13's breakfast program.

== Career ==
Zarza obtained a journalism degree from the Universidad Católica de Chile and an economics degree from the Complutense University of Madrid, and started his journalism career in 1990 as collaborator of El Heraldo de México. From 1990 to 1992 he worked as newsreader in Radio Mil and Radio Formula.

In 1995 he joined Azteca Noticias as a reporter; later in 1999 he was hired as anchor of the mid-day edition of Hechos. He covered events such as the 2004 Madrid train bombings, the violence in Chiapas and the 2010 Chilean mine rescue.

Since May 2, 2011 he has been anchor of Hechos AM.
