= Pepe Abad =

José "Pepe" Abad
- Occupation(s): Television presenter and radio host

José Abad was a Spanish-Chilean television presenter and radio host. From 1975, until his premature death in 1980, he anchored 60 Minutos in Televisión Nacional.
