= Adriana Arboleda =

Colombian model and presenter

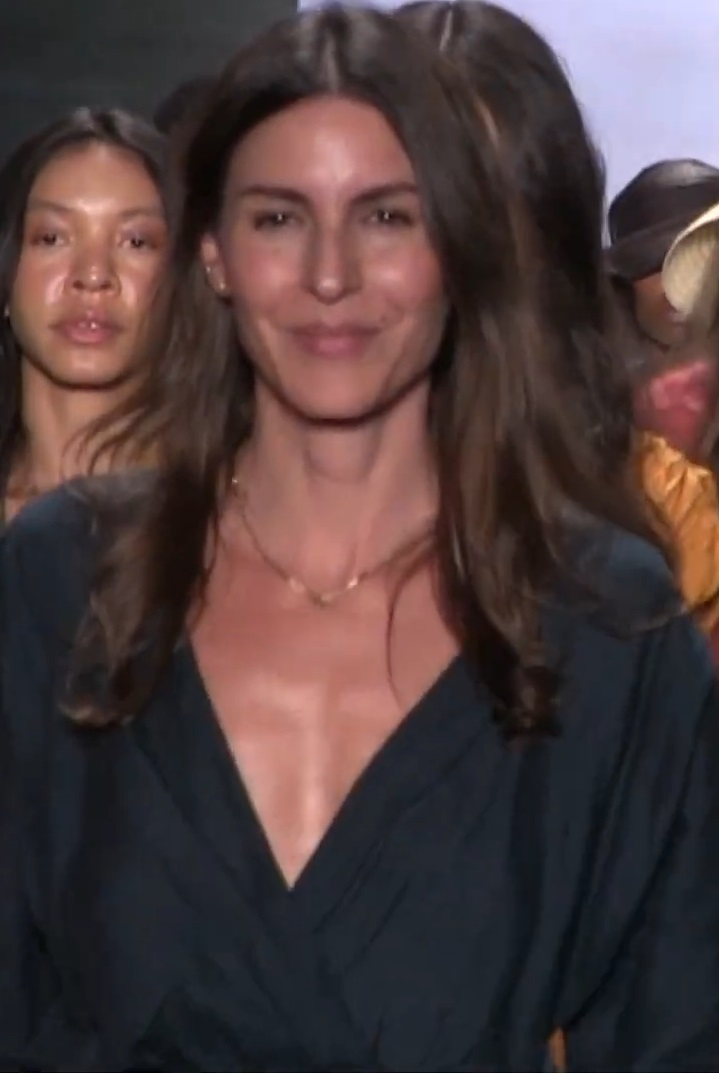
- Arboleda at Cali ExpoShow in 2023
- Born: 1977 (age 48–49); Cali, Colombia.
- Occupations: model, presenter
- Years active: 1994–present

Adriana Arboleda (born 1978) is a Colombian model and presenter.

== Career ==
At the age of 15, Adriana began her career in modeling and won the contest in the 1995 Model Year. In 1996, she was appointed to Look of the Year and she has been on the cover of magazines like Vanity and Cosmopolitan.

In 2001, Adriana also ventured into acting on the hit Colombian telenovela Yo soy Betty, la fea.

In 2003, her debuts as a host of entertainment was in the CM & newscast, but she had appeared on programs such as Panorama, American Blind and QAP News. A few months later, Adriana went on to present the section of entertainment at Caracol Noticias, next to the model and also Lina Marulanda.

With the release of the news Marulanda, Arboleda came to lead the entertainment section for issuing, along with Ivan Lalinde, she continued to show that section in issuing the 19:00, next to the model, Catalina Gomez. It also leads with Ursula Varges, Habitat program channel cable Discovery Home and Health.

On 7 July 2007, Adriana presented the expert in music of the W Radio (Colombia), Manolo Bellon, the telecast for Colombia's Live Earth.

== Personal life ==
At the age of 19, Arboleda was married to actor and singer, Alejandro Martinez, but divorced four years later. In 2009, she married business man Harold Eder.
