= Miel Louw =

Belgian television presenter, journalist and writer (1933–2007)

- Born: 26 May 1933; Leuven, Belgium
- Died: 8 December 2007 (aged 74); Leuven, Belgium
- Occupations: Television host, journalist and writer

Miel Louw (26 May 1933 – 8 December 2007, Leuven) was a Belgian journalist, television presenter, and writer. He worked for Vlaamse Radio- en Televisieomroeporganisatie (VRT) for 32 years.

Louw began his career in 1961, and worked as a news journalist in radio and television. He reported for the current affairs series Echo from 1968 to 1974 and the consumer documentary series Wikken en wegen from 1974 until 1979. He retired in 1993 and died of lung cancer in 2007 at the age of 74.
