= Lina Marulanda =

Colombian television personality and model

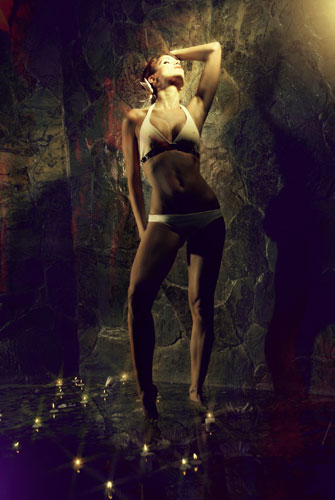
- Born: Lina María Marulanda Cuartas; 15 May 1980; Medellín, Colombia
- Died: 22 April 2010 (aged 29); Bogotá, Colombia
- Occupations: Television personality Model
- Years active: 1999–2010

Lina Marulanda (born Lina María Marulanda Cuartas; 15 May 1980 – 22 April 2010) was a Colombian television personality and model.

== Early life ==
Marulanda was born in Medellín, Colombia. She began her modeling career at age 12. She first attended Santa María del Rosario de Medellín High School but moved to Parra Paris High School, from which she graduated, following conflicts with the directors and nuns at Santa María. Her adolescence was extremely busy with fashion shows and photo shoots; in a 2004 interview, Marulanda said she regretted having grown up this way.

After completing high school, Marulanda enrolled in Jorge Tadeo Lozano University in Bogotá, where she studied advertising.

== Career ==
In 2002, she debuted as a presenter at CM& News. She later worked at Caracol News for six years, where she presented the 0700 edition and the international section of the broadcast. Beginning in 2003, she presented the entertainment portion of the evening news alongside actress Margarita Ortega and later alongside model Adriana Arboleda.

In December 2005, Marulanda went on to lead the entertainment portion of Caracol News at 12:30, with journalist and presenter Ivan Lalinde.

In early 2007, she hosted the reality show Challenge 20-07 on Canal Caracol. That July, she returned to CM& News, doing special reports on Colombiamoda 2007. She also reported on Colombiamoda 2007 for the station W Radio. On 24 July 2007, Marulanda joined the team of La hora del Regreso on W Radio, replacing Marcela Sarmiento.

She was a spokesmodel for major brands of clothing and appeared in magazines including SoHo, Don Juan, Cromos, and G.

== Death ==
On 22 April 2010, Marulanda died upon falling from the balcony of her sixth-floor apartment. Her death was considered a suicide. Marulanda was with her parents, ex-husband, and a doctor at the time. She was in the midst of divorce proceedings with Carlos Oñate, her second husband, to whom she had been married for only three months.
