= Jonathan Roussel =

Honduran journalist (born 1937)

Jonathan Roussel Toledo (born 16 August 1937, in Yoro) is a Honduran journalist, currently works as host of the radio program Vidrio Molido on Radio Cadena Voces and the television program De Cara al Pueblo in Canal 11.

On 10 May 2013, the Honduran Journalist Association announced that Roussel was to be distinguished with the "Alvaro Contreras" award.
