= Aida Nersissyan =

Armenian presenter and newscaster (born 1946)

- Աիդա Ներսիսյան
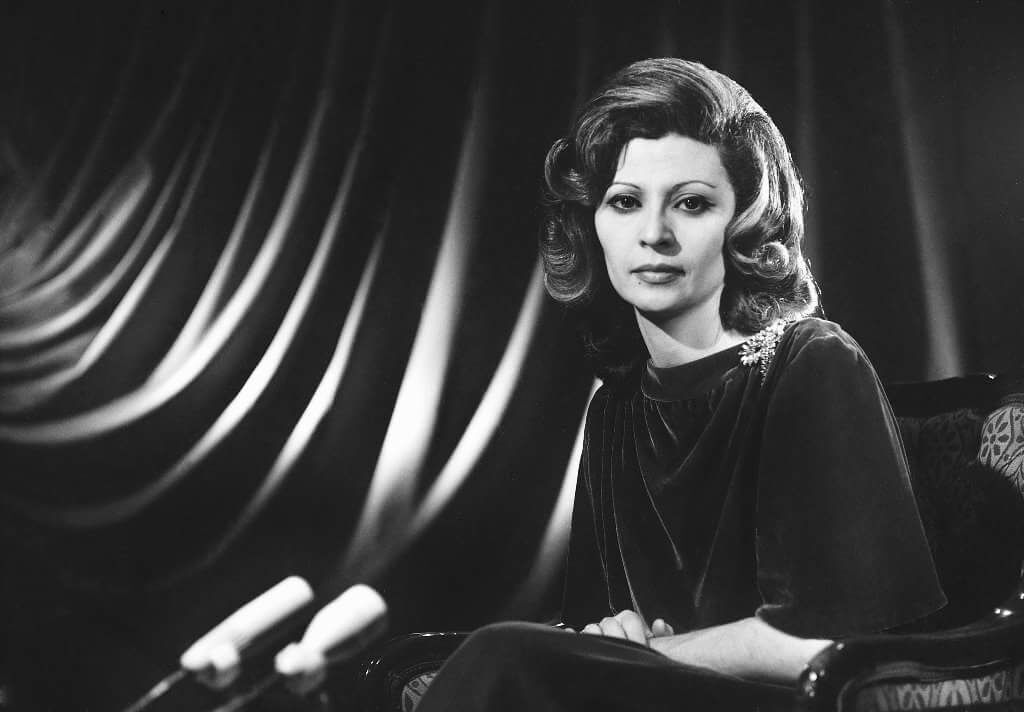
- Nersissyan in 1980
- Born: Aida Garrniki Nersissyan; October 6, 1948 (age 77); Yerevan, Armenian SSR
- Education: Yerevan State University
- Occupations: Television presenter; newscaster; researcher
- Years active: 1971–present

Aida Garrniki Nersissyan (Armenian: Աիդա Գառնիկի Ներսիսյան; October 6, 1948) is an Armenian television presenter, newscaster and researcher.

== Early life and education ==
Nersissyan was born on October 6, 1948 in Yerevan, Armenian SSR (present-day Armenia). She finished Levon Arissyan School # 127 in Yerevan, and from 1966 to 1971 she studied at Philological Department of Yerevan State University, majoring in Armenian Language and Literature.

== Career ==
Beginning in 1971 Nersissyan worked at the Public Television company of Armenia as an announcer. She has worked in the TV industry for about 30 years, presenting news broadcasts, programs on arts, cinema, literature and music, as well as educational programs. In 1987 she was granted a qualification of Eminent Announcer.

Nersissyan has prepared such announcers as Grigor Harutyunyan and Sirvard Ghazaryan.

During the years, when she worked at the Television Company, Nersissyan presented a series of educational programs titled Classics of Armenian Literature. These sessions were adapted to the school curriculum to inject patriotism and love of literature in students, help them improve their language and speak in clear, Armenian. In 2001 Nersissyan was laid off from work. From 2001 to 2009 she worked at Radio VEM as an announcer.

== Social activity ==
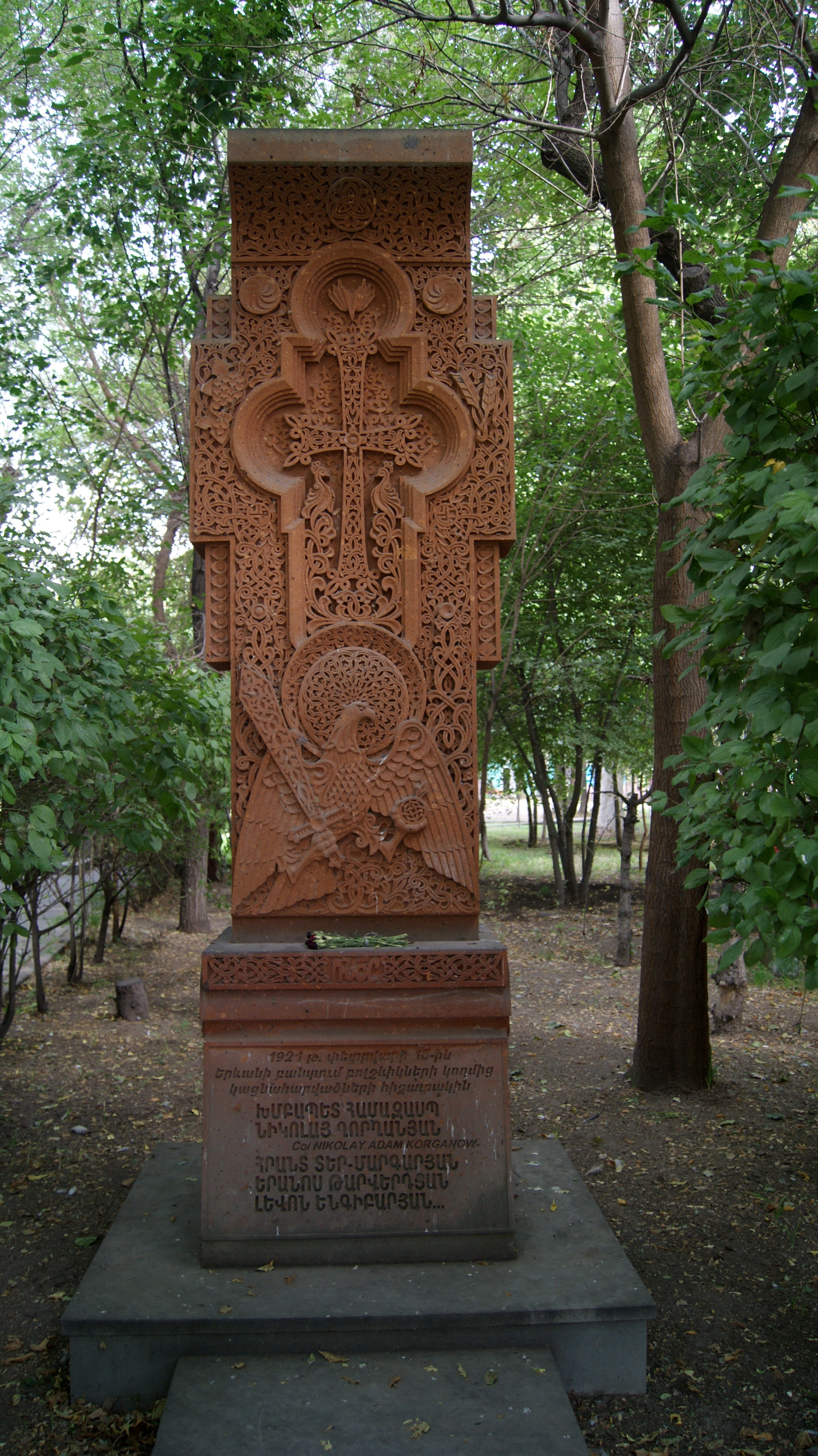
Khachkar memorial for slaughtered Armenians in Yerevan jail placed by the initiative of Aida Nerssisyan

After the collapse of the Soviet Union, Nersissyan conducted research for many years at public archives of Armenia and Georgia on her own initiative, with the aim of gathering information, documents and materials about outstanding Armenian military who were slaughtered with axes by bolsheviks in the jail of Yerevan the night between the February 17 and 18, 1921. With the support of the Armenia's Defense Ministry, Nersissyan has authored and published a manual titled Soldier's Book-Set and prepared a documentary film about one of these slaughtered heroes, commander of cavalry regiment in Gharakilisa battle, colonel Nikolay Ghorghanyan. Apart from this, she has found the place where these heroes were buried (previously Park of Young Communists, now English Park). Later a memorial-cross was erected there for the martyred heroes.
