= Martin Dougan =

Scottish television presenter (born 1987)

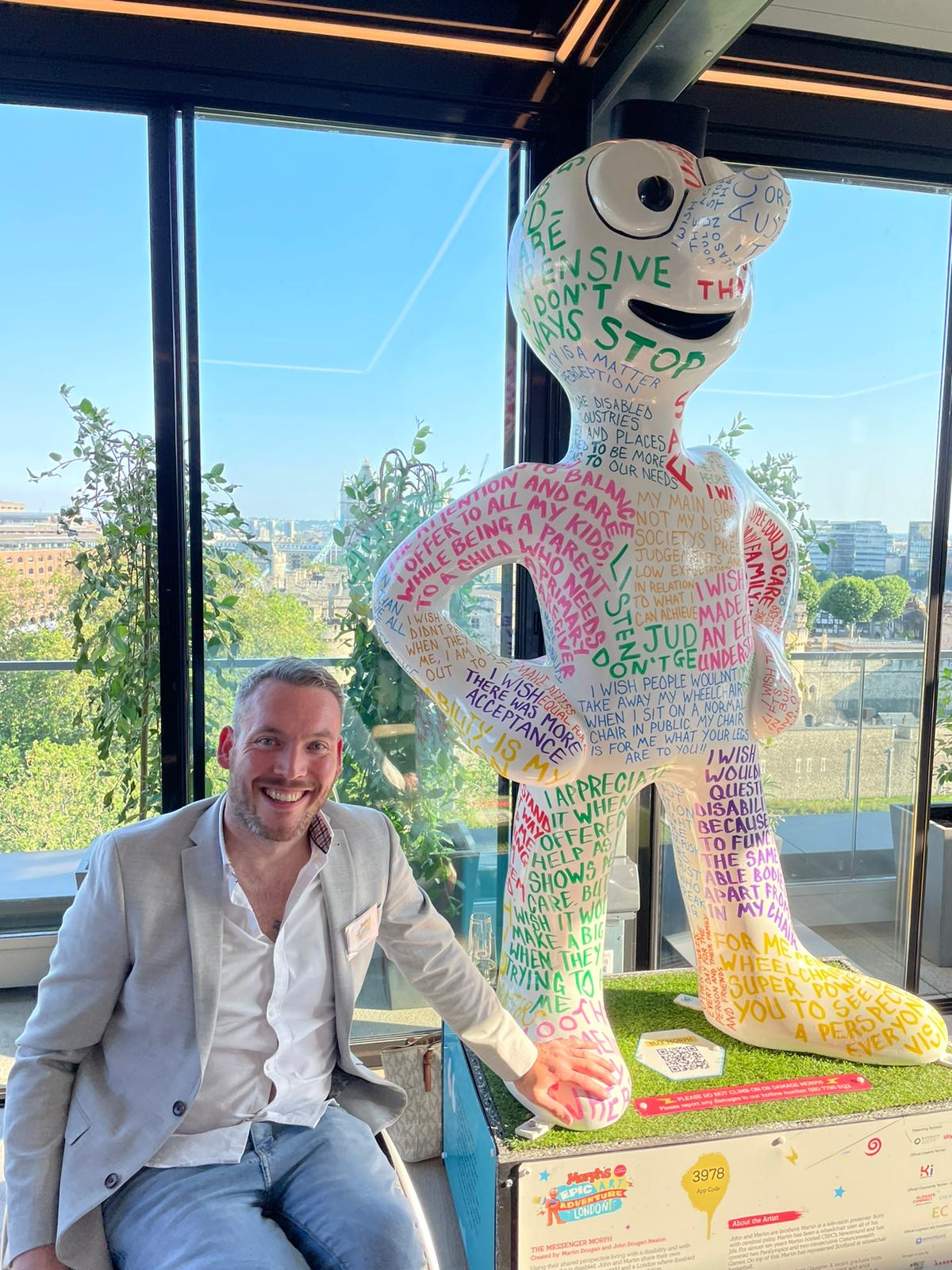
- Martin Dougan for Newsround, 2022
- Born: 31 May 1987 (age 38); Glasgow, Scotland, United Kingdom
- Citizenship: British
- Occupations: Television presenter, journalist
- Employer(s): Channel 4 (2010–2012); BBC (2013–2022)
- Known for: Newsround (2013–present)
- Children: 1
- Awards: BAFTA (nomination)
- Website: martindougan.com

Martin Dougan (born 31 May 1987) is a Scottish television presenter and producer. He was born with cerebral palsy and has represented Scotland in wheelchair basketball and rugby.

He is best known for his work on BBC Newsround, where he was a presenter from 2013 to 2022.

== Early life ==
Dougan was born in Glasgow, Scotland in 1987. He grew up in the Partick area in the west end of the city where he lived with his mother, father and younger brother John. He was born prematurely which resulted in a cerebral palsy diagnosis at a young age. Despite the restrictions that came with his condition, he was a keen footballer.

In 2001 at age 14, he underwent a major surgical procedure to install metal plates in each of his hips in order to strengthen the surrounding muscles. This procedure left him unable to walk. He then took up wheelchair basketball, and played for the Bathgate based team Lothian Phoenix.

Before embarking on a career as a television presenter, Dougan worked as a barman from a stool and later in the carpentry department for a council-led organisation named Blindcraft (now RSBI). Here, where fifty per cent of the workforce identified as disabled, he assisted in the building of kitchens, sofas and more.

== Career ==
Dougan first came to prominence when he was selected as part of Channel 4's Half Million Quid Talent Search in 2010. This opportunity provided a training programme for a select group of aspiring presenters in the lead-up to the 2012 Summer Paralympics in London. During this process he was an Olympic torchbearer at Meadowbank Stadium in Edinburgh, covered the 2011 BT Paralympic World Cup in Cardiff, Wales and assisted in the coverage of the London games.

Between 2013 and 2022, Dougan was one of the main presenters on the BBC daily news bulletin Newsround. He remains one of the show's longest-serving presenters in its fifty-plus-year history. As part of his work at Newsround, he interviewed many high-profile individuals and covered various major world events. These events included the 2014 Commonwealth Games in Glasgow, 2016 Summer Paralympics in Rio de Janeiro, 2018 Commonwealth Games in Gold Coast and the 2024 Summer Paralympics in Paris. He also produced and presented short documentary features for the show. One of these features, Frontline Families, led to Dougan being nominated for a BAFTA Award in the Children/Factual Category in 2014. While another detailed the global impact of climate change, and as part of the production Dougan led a team to Fiji and Australia. Here they captured examples of how the climate emergency was impacting environments abroad.

In addition to his work at Newsround, in 2015 Dougan became a regular entertainment presenter for the Number One Show on BBC Radio 1, and was billed on the BBC's core presenting team for Glastonbury Festival 2016.

In April 2022, he chose to step away from Newsround and became a freelance presenter and journalist. However, he still occasionally presents Newsround and covered the Paralympics in Paris for Newsround during 2024. Since 2022, he has regularly contributed to Sky Sports News and BBC Scotland's The Nine.

Throughout his career in television, Dougan has appeared as a guest presenter and participant on various other renowned television shows in the UK, including Jeremy Vine, This Morning, Celebrity Pointless and Celebrity Eggheads. As of 2024, Dougan is an ambassador for Sunrise Medical's Quickie Wheelchairs and regularly works alongside the charity Whizz Kidz UK.

== Personal life ==
Dougan lives in Manchester, England with his long-term partner Amy, and has one daughter.

He is an avid supporter of Rangers F.C.
