= Leonardo Villalobos =

José Leonardo Villalobos Alvarado
- Born: September 7, 1970 (age 55); Maracaibo, Zulia, Venezuela
- Occupation(s): Television personality, actor
- Years active: 1991–present
- Spouse: Yomily Corredor (2012–present)

José Leonardo Villalobos Alvarado (born September 7, 1970) also known as Leonardo Villalobos is a Venezuelan actor, and television personality known for hosting the shows Portada's from 2005 until 2009, and Súper Sábado Sensacional from 2010 until 2016.

== Career ==
Villalobos had minor roles in numerous telenovelas throughout his career, the first being Bellisima which aired on Venevision from 1991 until 1992. In 2005, Villalobos returned to Venevision and hosted the variety show Portada's. Villalobos left the show by 2010, when he was chosen to be the next host of Súper Sábado Sensacional, a role he held until July 30, 2016. Then the following week after over 6 years of hosting the show he left the program due to work commitments and he was replaced by Henrys Silva who was chosen on August 1 to replace Leonardo Villalobos as the new host of the program. He would later move to the Dominican Republic and work for the Telemicro Group until 2022, where he announced he would step away due to family obligations.

== Personal life ==
Villalobos is currently married to model Yomily Corredor as of 2012.

== Filmography ==
- Bellisima (1991–1992)
- Amores de Fin de Siglo (1995)
- Pecade de Amor (1995–1996)
- Volver a Vivir (1996–1997)
- A Todo Corazon (1997–1998)
- Mujercitas (1999)
- Mariú (2000)
- Carissima (2000–2001)
- Portada's (2005–2009)
- La Vida Entera (2008–2009)
- Súper Sábado Sensacional (2010–2016)
- Sábado Extraordinario (2016–2020)
- De Extremo a Extremo (2020–2022)
- El Show del Mediodía con Leonardo Villalobos (2022–present)

Media offices
| Preceded by Daniel Sarcos; 1997–2009 | Host of Súper Sábado Sensacional; 2010–2016 | Succeeded by Henrys Silva; 2016– |
