= Maria Del Rio =

Belgian comedian, radio and television presenter of Spanish descent

Maria Del Rio (born 25 March 1973) is a Belgian comedian, radio and television presenter of Spanish descent.

== Biography ==
She was born and raised in Brussels and has a height of 164 cm.

She started her career in theatre in 1996, arrived at the RTBF (Radio et Télévision de Belgique Francophone) in 1997, then moved on to RTL-TVI in April 2005. She has presented television programs such as Aimez-nous and MDR. At the RTBF, she co-presents the entertainment show Bingovision with Thomas Van Hamme, who joined her later at RTL-TVI.

In 1997, Maria Del Rio appeared briefly, as a waitress, in the film Des gens si bien élevés produced by Alain Nahum. The lead role was performed by Michèle Morgan.

In 2003, she released a single, Luz de la Luna, under the label Ars-Universal. It got the 16th place in the Belgian charts in Flanders.

She co-presented Good Morning on Radio Contact (weekdays 6 to 10 a.m.), with Pascal Degrez from September 2009 until September 2014, and since then with Olivier Arnould.

She performed on stage in La Revue for fifteen years, and in L'Amuse-gueule (Théâtre royal des Galeries), Silence en coulisse (Théâtre Le Public, 2003), Rain Man (Théatre Le Public, 2009).

On 23 November 2007, she gave birth to her son Diego, from her relationship with the comedian Damien Gillard.

In 2008 and 2009, Maria del Rio took part in an action against violence called Dessine-moi en soleil.
