= Renato Bartilotti =

Mexican actor

Renato Bartilotti (born June 11, 1976, in Villahermosa, Tabasco) is a Mexican actor who has played mostly in telenovelas.

== Career ==
After enrolling in Televisa's Centro de Educación Artística (CEA), Renato Bartilotti began his career as an actor in the telenovela Mi Pequeña Traviesa, produced by Pedro Damián, in which he played a character nicknamed "El Sopas".

His first role was in Locura de Amor, alongside Osvaldo Benavides and Juan Soler; simultaneously joining the musical production for Primer Amor... A Mil Por Hora.

Renato Bartilotti has played in other telenovelas, including Canción de Amor and Emilio Larrosa's Soñadoras. Later, he entered Toma Libre. He also appeared in Día de perros, hosting as the leader of the show. Later he and Kristoff Raczyñski set up Malogato Films and developed the script Y Tu Papá También, a parody of films from all around the world (mostly Mexican).

In 2008, Mario Bartilotti played Humberto in the Mexican T.V. series Mujeres Asesinas.
