= Birmania Ríos =

Dominican American journalist

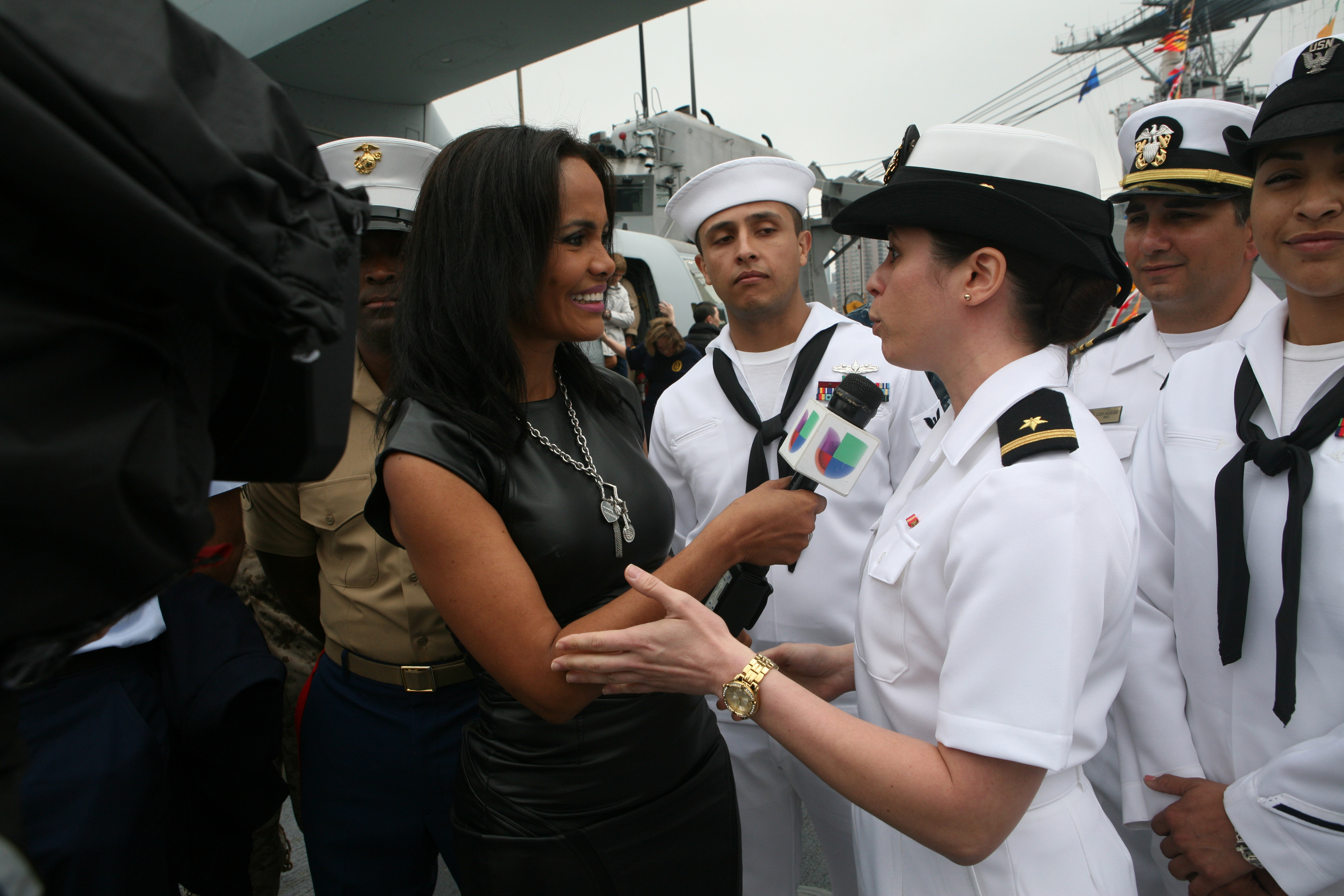
- Rios (in black dress) interviewing a US Navy sailor during Fleet Week in New York City
- Born: New York City, New York, United States
- Education: Universidad del Sagrado Corazón
- Notable credit(s): Anchor and Correspondent (Univision WXTV)
- Family: daughter Valentina

Birmania Ríos (born in New York City, United States), is a Dominican American television news journalist. Birmania (her name is the Spanish name used for the country of Burma, which is now called Myanmar) resided in New York until the age of four, when her family decided to relocate to Puerto Rico. She spent her adolescence and early adulthood on the island and upon finishing her studies and obtaining a degree in communications from Universidad del Sagrado Corazón in San Juan, she left Puerto Rico and relocated back to New York. Upon arriving in the city, she participated in productions with the Puerto Rican Traveling Theater, founded by the legendary Puerto Rican stage actress Miriam Colón. However, it was when she found employment as a publicist on a local Public-access television show, The Caribe Show, that opportunity came knocking. A chance to be in front of the cameras came about one day when the show's host was unable to host. After filling in during her absence, she won the producer's and audience's admiration, and then was permanently offered the job.

From this experience, Birmania gained local recognition in New York City's Latino community, and soon afterwards she became a familiar face on local Univision station WXTV, where she became a weather anchor, then she became a general assignment reporter and for two years she was the hostess of an entertainment show called Sabado al Mediodia. Two years later she became the news anchor on the station's morning news broadcast Al Despertar. She stayed with the station until 2005, when she decided to join Univision's nationally televised morning show, Despierta America. Since joining the program, she has become an audience favorite and serves as the program's local correspondent in the New York City metropolitan area.

She resides in New York City with her daughter, Valentina.

== See also ==
- New Yorkers in journalism
