= Mónica Jaramillo =

Colombian journalist, news presenter, model and former beauty pageant contestant

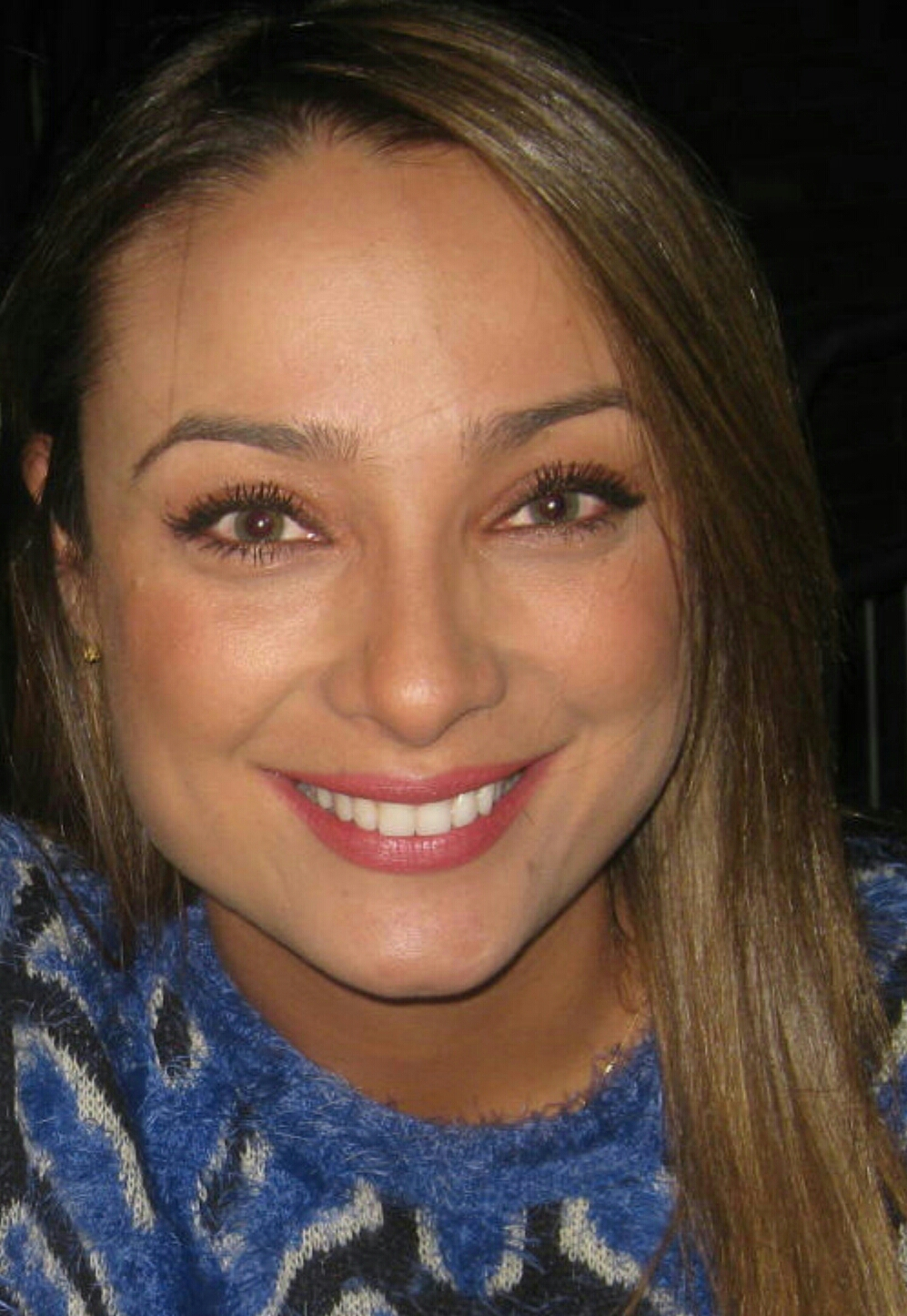
- Mónica Jaramillo in Bogotá, Colombia, 2018.
- Born: Mónica Patricia Jaramillo Giraldo; September 30, 1984 (age 41); Marinilla, Antioquia
- Occupations: Journalist, news presenter, model
- Notable credit(s): Noticias Caracol presenter (2013-2020); Blu Radio radio hostess (2014- )

Mónica Patricia Jaramillo Giraldo (born September 30, 1984, in Marinilla, Antioquia) known as Mónica Jaramillo, is a Colombian journalist, news presenter, model and former beauty pageant contestant.

== Biography ==
Her parents are Hernando Jaramillo and Nora Giraldo, who have together two more children, Juan Fernando and Adriana, respectively. Mónica studied at the Pontifical Bolivarian University, where she majored in Social Communication and Journalism. Years after, she got a master's degree in political science at the University of Los Andes in 2013.

== Career ==
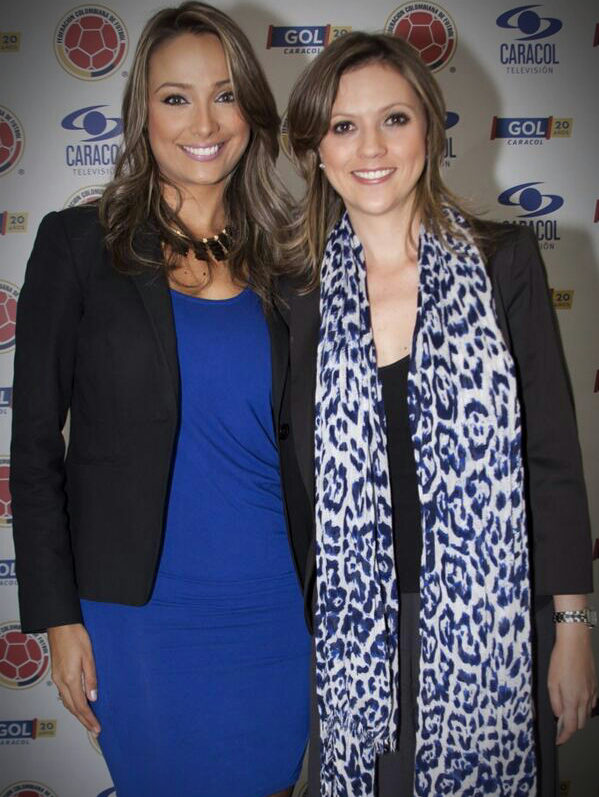
Mónica Jaramillo and Catalina Gómez during a Caracol TV's event in 2014.

She participated in Miss Colombia 2003, as Antioquia department contestant. In the final night, she was elected as second runner-up. Jeymmy Vargas and Catherine Daza were the first runner-up and winner, respectively. Later, in 2004, she competed in the international beauty pageant Reina Sudamericana, in Bolivia, and became first runner-up. Formerly, Mónica won the crown in the Reina Bolivariana pageant, in Guayaquil, Ecuador.

In March 2004, she began her career in journalism, hosting the weekends edition of Teleantioquia Noticias, while she finished her journalism studies at college. Two years later, she hosted the primetime edition, and held that position until 2009, when she became the hostess of Un Café con Alonso (institutional program of the Mayor's Office of Medellín) and the central edition of Telemedellín news. In the second half of 2010, she began working in Día a día, a morning TV magazine on Caracol Televisión, as reporter of the show from Antioquia's capital. Subsequently, she became an anchor of international edition of CM& news.

In 2013 she joined Noticias Caracol, as First Edition reporter, presenting 15-minute-news-capsules across the morning news. Since 2014, Mónica has worked as radio hostess, in the morning radial magazine Mañanas Blu 10 AM, broadcast by Blu Radio, along with Catalina Plata, Esteban Hernández and William Calderón. Currently, Mónica co-host the noon edition of Noticias Caracol, alongside Vanessa de la Torre and directs Vive Medellín.

== Personal life ==
Mónica is married with Luis Eduardo Valencia, Fabio Valencia Cossio's son. They have a son together, Joaquin (born May 4, 2016). Mónica has said that her workmate Jorge Alfredo Vargas and the former CNN en Español presenter Claudia Palacios, have been great influencers on her career, as well as the Pakistani activist Malala Yousafzai. She was honoured by the Brazil government, with the Rio Branco medal distinction, due to her participation in the memorial ceremony to the deceased people of the Chapecoense team plane crash, held in Medellin in December 2016.
