= Vanessa de la Torre =

Colombian journalist

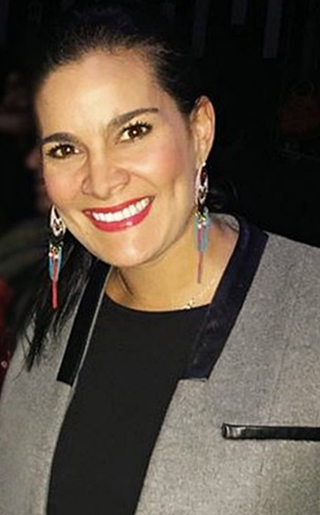
- de la Torre in 2016
- Born: Gloria Vanessa de la Torre Sanclemente; 10 January 1978 (age 48); Cali, Colombia
- Education: Pontifical Xavierian University * Georgetown University
- Occupation: Journalist

Gloria Vanessa de la Torre Sanclemente (born 10 January 1978) is a Colombian journalist. She is currently the week midday co-anchor of Noticias Caracol and is the presenter of the research program El rastro.

== Biography ==
De La Torre was born on 10 January 1978 in Cali. She is the daughter of Alejandro de la Torre and Gloria Sanclemente. De La Torre studied social communication with emphasis in journalism at the Pontifical Xavierian University in Bogotá with expertise in Latin American Studies at Georgetown University in Washington D.C. She began her career at CNN en Español which was reporting the September 11 attacks, and later became a reporter for programadora CM&.

De La Torre later served as a correspondent for Noticias Caracol from Washington D.C., as well as working for W Radio. She returned to Colombia in 2011 to join as a presenter on the morning broadcast of the news, along with Juan Diego Alvira. De La Torre is the current presenter of the afternoon edition of Noticias Caracol alongside Mónica Jaramillo, and of the investigative program El rastro which airs during the holiday period, and is part of the schedule of the Mornings Blu of Bluradio with Néstor Morales.

== Personal life ==
She is married to Diego Santos, the manager of digital content and products at "Casa Editorial El Tiempo", which whom she has two daughters.
