= El Radar =

Colombian current affairs programme

- Genre: News and current affairs programme
- Directed by: Darío Fernando Patiño
- Presented by: Jorge Alfredo Vargas; Darío Fernando Patiño
- Country of origin: Colombia
- Original language: Spanish

Production
- Producer: Caracol TV
- Running time: 30 minutes with commercials

Original release
- Network: Caracol TV
- Release: April 28, 2008 – December 2011

Related
- Mesa de noche

El radar was a Colombian current affairs programme broadcast on weeknights at 23:00 on Caracol TV.

It was presented in April 2008 by Jorge Alfredo Vargas or its director Darío Fernando Patiño (before that its presenter was D'Arcy Quinn. Most episodes feature one, two, or three interviews with politicians, analysts, artists, businesspeople, etc. The interviewers are well-known Colombian journalists from radio, television, and print media.

Twice a week the comical duo Tola y Maruja appear to mock Colombian politics and society. Its section on El radar was nominated for the India Catalina award (part of the Cartagena Film Festival) for Best Journalism and/or Opinion Programme in 2008.

On early 2009, its Monday time slot was filled with repeats of Séptimo día. During some weeks in May and June 2009 it was moved to 23:30 to make room for the Telemundo telenovela La novela basada en Sin tetas no hay paraíso, but after complaints from the viewers (and jokes by Tola y Maruja during the programme), it was returned to its initial time slot.

== Regular interviewers ==
- Paulo Laserna Phillips
- Camilo Durán
- Daniel Samper Ospina
- Ernesto McCausland
- Darío Arizmendi
- María Emma Mejía
- José Gabriel Ortiz
- Paola Ochoa
- Félix de Bedout
- Javier Hernández Bonnet
- María Elvira Samper
- Yamid Amat Serna
- Gustavo Gómez
- Manuel Teodoro
- Gustavo Duncan
- Felipe Zuleta
- Beatriz Gómez
- Antonio Morales
