= QAP (Colombia) =

Colombian television newscast

QAP was a Colombian newscast aired between January 2, 1992 and December 31, 1997 on Canal A. It was produced by the programadora TV13.

== History ==
In 1991, the journalists María Isabel Rueda and María Elvira Samper had the idea to create their own news production company. Soon, Enrique Santos Calderón (of El Tiempo newspaper and broadsheet), businessman Julio Andrés Camacho and Nobel Prize winner Gabriel García Márquez joined the project, with the goal of creating an independent newscast.

QAP had several major technological firsts. It was the first Colombian newscast to have microwave equipment and the first to broadcast from its own studios (as newly permitted in the call for bids, or licitación, of 1991).

QAP ended in New Year's Eve 1997 (Wednesday, December 31), as a result of changes in the television law that removed the extensibility of the original six-year contract (the original contract called for six years with an option to extend for another six). Because of the independence of the newscast, García Márquez was convinced that the law was written specifically to take QAP off the air. In the end, a new licitación occurred that year, and QAP opted not to participate (retracting its original proposal); its directors found that the impartiality needed for QAP to win in this new bidding cycle was lacking.

Inés María Zabaraín was the main presenter for QAP during its run on air.

== Presenters and journalists ==
- Paulo Laserna Phillips
- Adriana La Rotta
- Jorge Alfredo Vargas
- Inés María Zabaraín
- Ernesto McCausland †
- Paula Jaramillo
- Vicky Dávila
- Juan Carlos Ruíz †
- María Cristina Uribe
- Gloria Congote †
- D'arcy Quinn
- Leyla Ponce de León
- Maribel Osorio
- Gloria Tisnés
- Ilse Milena Borrero
- John Portela
- Héctor Fabio Cardona
- Clara Elvira Ospina
- Mariana Lloreda
- Carlos Antonio Vélez
- Carlos Zapata
- Clara Estrada
- Karl Troller
- Ana Cristina Bueno
- Juan Guillermo Ortiz Osorno
- María Lucía Fernández
- Paola Turbay
- Mónica Hernández
- Laila Rodríguez
- Martha Ávila
- Richard Freddy Muñoz
- Adriana Arboleda
- Victor Javier Solano
- Sergio Barbosa
- Silvia Martínez
- Mauricio Salcedo
- Iván Lalinde
- Maria Andrea Charry
