= Mábel Lara =

Colombian journalist, radio host and presenter

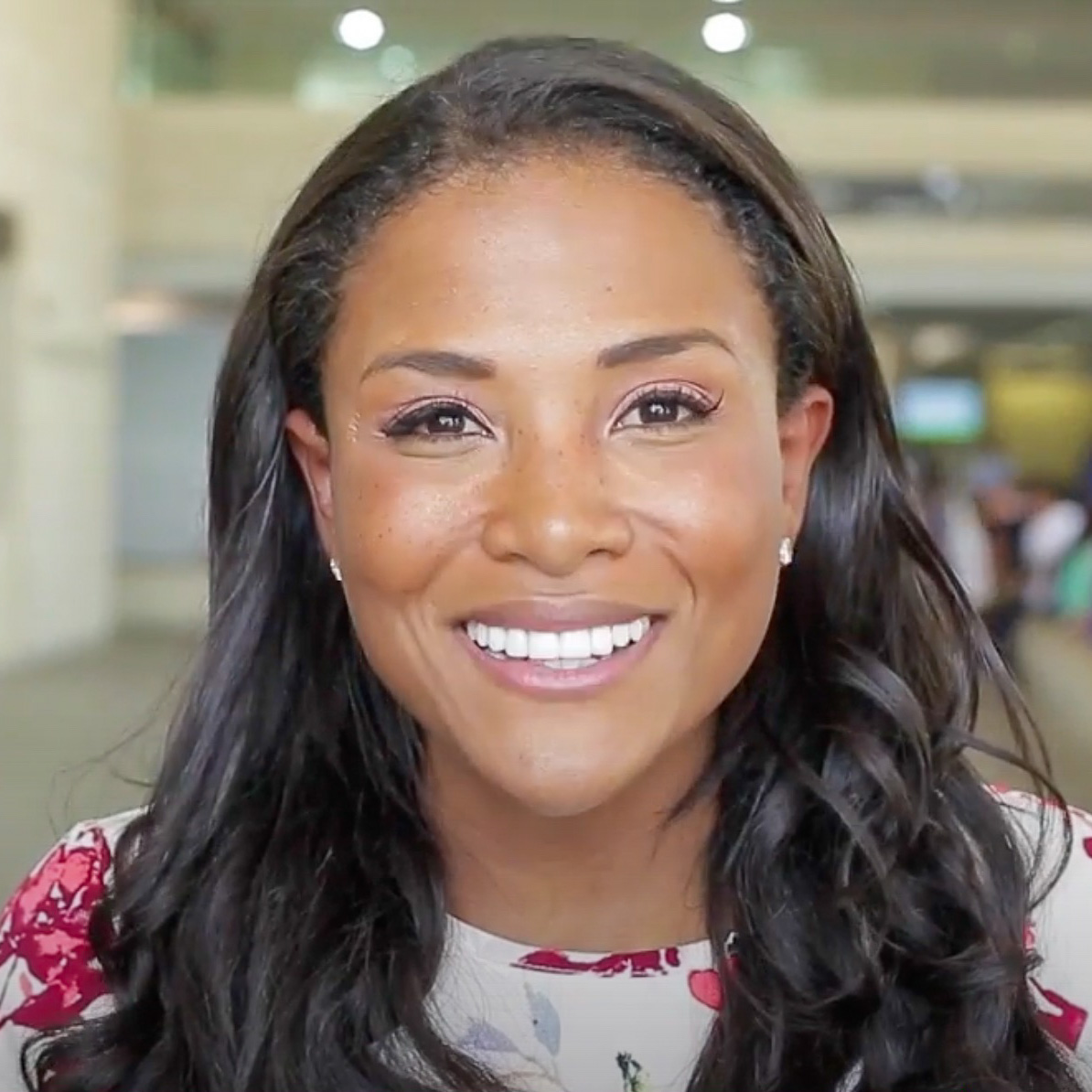
- Born: Mábel Lorena Lara Dinas; August 17, 1980 (age 45); Puerto Tejada, Cauca, Colombia
- Occupations: Journalist, news presenter
- Notable credit(s): Noticias Caracol presenter (2008–present); Blu Radio radio host (2013–present)

Mábel Lorena Lara Dinas (born August 17, 1980 in Puerto Tejada, Cauca, Colombia) is a Colombian journalist, radio host and presenter.

== Career ==
Lara studied her high school in Cali's Tulio Enrique Tascón School of Free University of Colombia. She graduated in Social communication at the "Universidad Santiago de Cali". After graduating from university, Mábel worked in the regional TV channel, Telepacífico.

She moved to Bogotá, to work in Noticias Caracol as weekend newscast at 2008, Then, she pass to the midday news edition, with Silvia Corzo and Juan Diego Alvira. Mábel debuted as radio host in 2013, at the radio news program Mañanas Blu alongside Nestor Morales and Felipe Zuleta. In February 2016, she left Noticias Caracol and moved from Bogotá to Cali, although she said that sporadically make reports for the news from Cali. Mabel currently directs and hosts the radio programs Blanco y negro and Vive Cali both on Blu Radio.

== Personal life ==
Mábel is married with the TV producer César Galvis, and they have a son, named Luciano, who was born in 2013. Mábel has also shown her support to the Afro-Colombian group with publicity and television campaigns, also works in social development projects in the north of Cauca and is linked to programs to help young gang members and heads of household.

== Awards ==
In 2012, 2013, 2015 and 2016, Mábel was nominated to the India Catalina awards, winning every year the "Best News Presenter" category. Also she holds the record for most winning awards in this category.

In the same years, she was nominated to the TV y Novelas awards, as Best News Presenter, winning only in 2012. Also, she win a Premio Nacional de Periodismo Simón Bolívar, thanks her special cultural report "Nuestra Herencia" in 2007.
