= The English School (Colegio de Inglaterra) =

Fundación Colegio de Inglaterra, The English School

Location
- Calle 170 #15-68; Bogotá, D.C; Colombia
- Coordinates: 4.749935°N 74.038453°W

Information
- Type: Private School
- Established: 1961
- Founder: Elisabeth Masson
- Teaching staff: 200 .
- Grades: Preschool - 11
- Gender: Mixed gender education
- Enrollment: 1666
- Houses: Lion, Phoenix, Unicorn and Dragon
- Student Union/Association: Student Council of The English School
- Colours: Blue, Red and white
- Athletics: Football, basketball, volleyball, gymnastics, Track and field, Table tennis, Chess, Dance
- Mascot: England Soldier
- Nickname: English, TES
- Accreditation: EFQM Quality School Certification
- National ranking: 12
- ICFES average: Muy Superior
- Newspaper: El glorioso
- Yearbook: Huts
- Alumni Association: AEXTES
- Parents Association: TESPAS
- Website: englishschool.edu.co

The English School (TES) officially known as the 'Colegio de Inglaterra' is a private school and is owned and managed by the Fundación Educativa de Inglaterra (FEI) Bogotá, Colombia. It offers the International Baccalaureate programme: including the IB Primary Years Programme (PYP), IB Middle Years Programme (MYP) and IB Diploma Programme (DP) alongside the Colombian Prueba Saber. Learning and teaching take place in the English, Spanish and French languages.

The school was founded by Elisabeth Masson in 1961 to offer a bilingual (Spanish) and English education to Colombians, as well as to the children of English-speaking foreign residents of Colombia from the UK, the U.S., and other nations. The English School takes accreditation with the European Framework for Quality Management (EFQM) for which it received 5-star accreditation in November 2019 and the Council of International Schools (CIS).

The school is divided into four levels: Preschool (ages 4–7), Primary School (ages 8–11), Middle School (ages 11–16) and Upper School (ages 16–18).

The school is an active member of the following: Asociación Andina de Colegios BI (AACBI) which was founded at The English School, Latin American Heads Association (LAHC), Round Square, Search Associates, The Hague International Model United Nations (THIMUN), Future We Want Model United Nations (FWWMUN), KIVA, UNCOLI. The UNCOLI is a local organisation of international schools in Bogotá. They are the governing body of all inter-school competitions and provide organisational support for sporting, academic and artistic events among the schools.

TESMUN is the English School's Model United Nations.

== Sports ==
In 2018-19 the English School won the overall trophies for the AACBI Cup and the British School of Barranquilla Games. The school belongs to the UNCOLI (Union of International Schools in Bogotá) Association.^{[8]} Students are encouraged to participate in sport from a young age, especially in football, basketball, volleyball, and track and field competitions. Competitive tournaments with other UNCOLI schools are available in the following age categories:

- Mayores (Grades 11 and 10)
- Juvenil (Grades 9 and 8)
- Infantil (Grades 7 and 6)
- Pre-Infantil (Grades 5 and 4)
- Benjamines (Grade 3, non-sanctioned)

The school is divided into houses for internal competitions. Houses are chosen randomly at the grade of kindergarten; there are four different houses: Lion, Phoenix, Unicorn and Dragon.

== Notable alumni ==
- Manuel Teodoro - Journalist and host in Séptimo día
- Juan Camilo Pryor - RAD/DF co-founder and Nada Que Perder's lead guitar.
- Jeison Larrota - RAD/DF co-founder
