= Daniela Pachón =

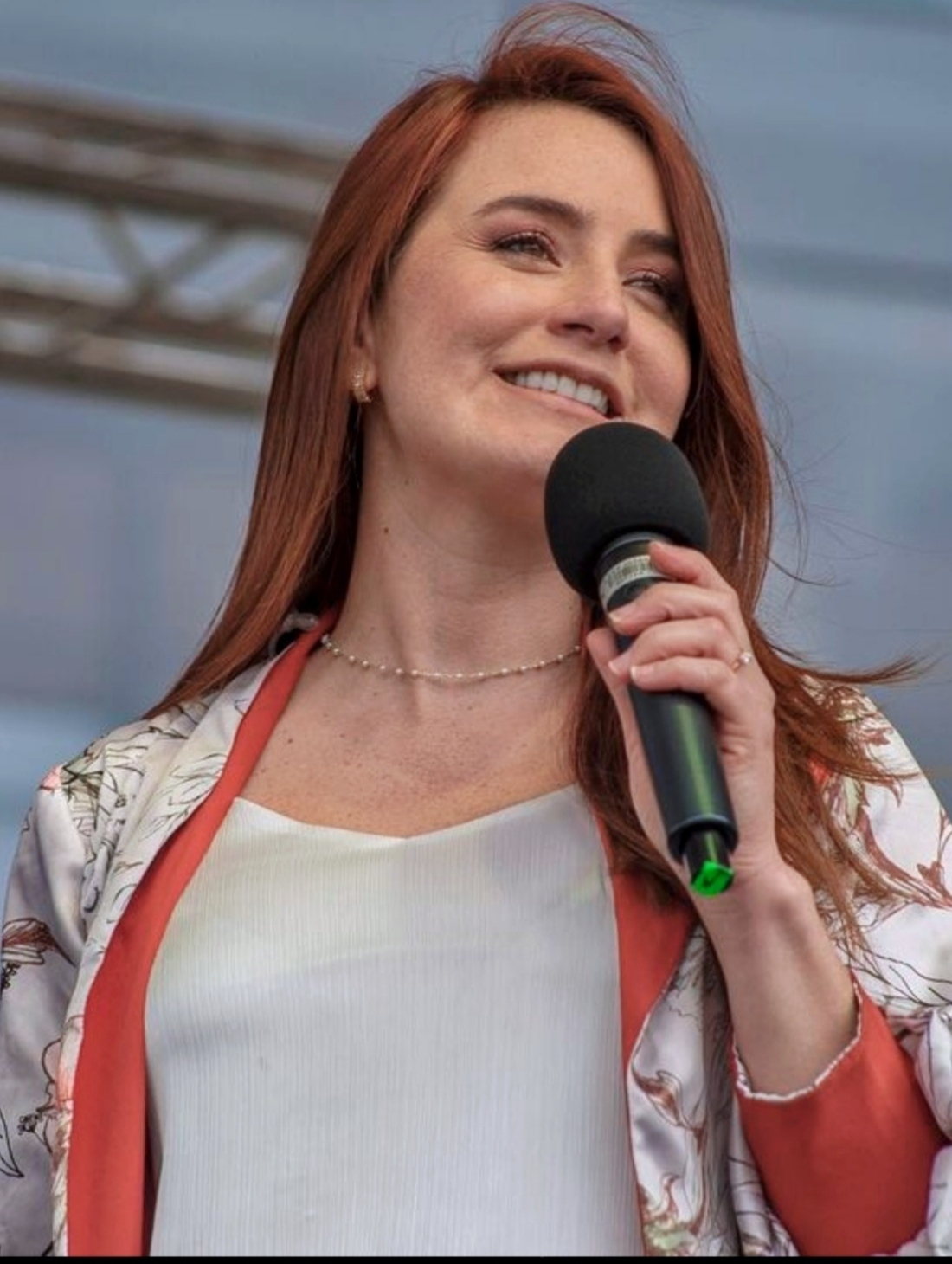
- Born: August 10, 1988 (age 38); Charalá, Colombia
- Education: Universidad Externado de Colombia; Autonomous University of Bucaramanga
- Occupations: Journalist and news anchor
- Website: @danielapachon

Julia Daniela Pachón Rivera (born 10 August 1988) is a Colombian journalist and news presenter. She graduated in Social Communication and Journalism from the Autonomous University of Bucaramanga. She is also a specialist in political marketing at the Universidad Externado de Colombia.

She began her career in several stations in the department of Santander. Then she worked in the Televisión Regional del Oriente, where she worked as a journalist and presenter of news programs and programs such as Región, as well as the institutional program of the Financier of Territorial Development (FINDETER). In 2016 she joined to Noticias Caracol de Caracol Televisión, as a judicial reporter in the weekend broadcasts.

In 2017 she became host of the weekend editions, first provisionally and then permanently, together with Juanita Gómez. She is also one of the conductors of the program Una mirada al mundo of Caracol TV Internacional.
