= Alejandra Giraldo =

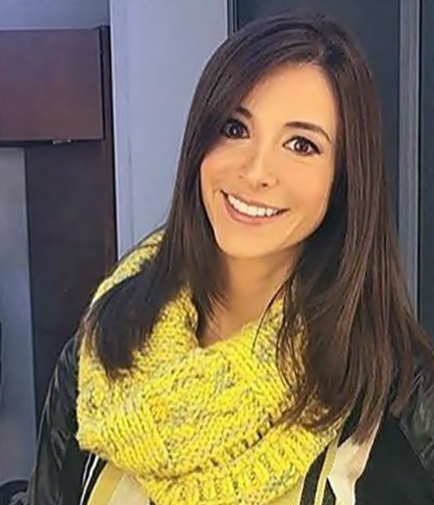
- Giraldo, 26 October 2016
- Born: Alejandra Giraldo Preciado; 9 April 1984 (age 42); Medellín
- Education: Pontifical Bolivarian University
- Occupations: Journalist, newscaster
- Height: 1.7 m (5.6 ft)

Alejandra Giraldo Preciado (born 9 April 1984) is a Colombian journalist, newscaster, and social commentator. She was born in Medellín, and graduated from the Pontifical Bolivarian University there.

== Biography ==
Alejandra Giraldo has worked as a journalist for TV news channel Teleantioquia, then presented for subscription-based news channel Cable Noticias and worked for Canal Capital on the culinary program De buen gusto. After some time working for Cable Noticias, she left and now currently works as a newscaster alongside Jennifer Montoya at Noticias Caracol.
