= Radio Líder =

Coordinates: 4.632505°N 74.067185°W

- Colombia
- Broadcast area: Bogotá
- Branding: HJCU

Programming
- Format: News / talk / music
- Affiliations: Cadena Melodía

Ownership
- Owner: Cadena Melodía

History
- First air date: 1947 (as Radio Industrial)-2012
- Former frequencies: 730 kHz 6140 kHz

Links
- Website: http://www.cadenamelodia.com/

Radio Líder was the flagship station of the AM network of Cadena Melodía, a Colombian radio network. It started in 1947 as Radio Industrial. It would later be renamed Radio Capital, until 1959 when Liberal party politician Efraín Páez Espitia bought the station and changed its name to Radio Melodía.

In 2012, Cadena Melodía rented sister station Melodía FM Estéreo to Valórem, owner of Caracol TV. Thus, Melodía FM Estéreo moved to the AM band, where Radio Líder was located.
