= Silvia Corzo =

Colombian lawyer and presenter

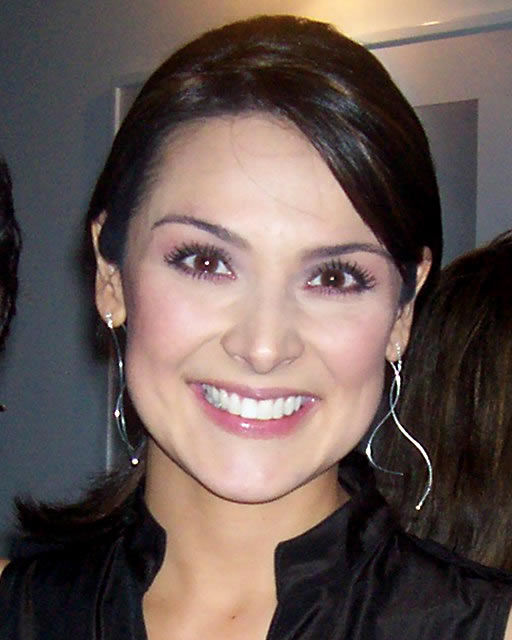
- Born: Silvia Milena Corzo Pinto; October 30, 1973 (age 52); Bucaramanga, Santander
- Occupations: Lawyer, journalist, news presenter
- Notable credit(s): Noticias RCN presenter (2015-2016); Cuatro Caminos presenter (2015-2016); Noticias Uno presenter (2011–2014); Séptimo día presenter (2007–2011), Noticias Caracol presenter (2002–2011)
- Children: 1

Silvia Milena Corzo Pinto (born October 30, 1973) is a Colombian lawyer and presenter.

== Biography ==
Corzo was born in Bucaramanga, Santander. Her parents are Mario Corzo and Irene Pinto. After finishing high school, Corzo studied at the Universidad Autónoma de Bucaramanga, where she majored in Law. In 1995, during her fifth and final year of college, her family signed her up for the Señorita Santander ("Miss Santander") beauty contest, where she was the runner-up. She considers that if she had won, she would not have finished her college studies, but would have become a model, an actress or a housewife.

According to her, she has always fancied working in the media and, although she has worked as a lawyer, she prefers human rights issues because she does not consider herself good at litigating.

== Media career ==
After graduating from college, Corzo hosted a radio show about human rights on the Universidad Industrial de Santander station, while working at the Bucaramanga branch of the National Ombudsman's Office. In 1997, she was offered to host a television show at the then brand new TRO local station.

She moved to Cali, after getting married. There, she worked at the Office of the Comptroller of the Department. At the same time, she hosted the Noticiero del Pacífico at Telepacífico on weekends. A new transfer of her then husband took her to Bogotá.

Since December 16, 2002, she was one of the news presenters at Noticias Caracol (at the time Caracol Noticias) newscast. At Noticias Caracol, Corzo managed –until early 2007– its health segments (previously in charge by Claudia Palacios, who left for CNN en Español in 2004), and between May 2007 and February 2008, presented the weather forecast at the 07:00 newscast. Corzo left Noticias Caracol for five weeks, but returned on March 12, 2008, at the 22:00 newscast. She was to leave because her son asked her to spend more time with him (see Personal life below), but according to one source, the network was flooded with calls from viewers asking for her return.

Since April 18, 2009, she hosted En todo su derecho, a specialized section on law, broadcast Saturdays and Sundays at the 12:30 newscast. In October 2009, after a brief contractual dispute, she was moved to the 12:30 weekday newscast and started to present the Código Caracol section for the 19:00 newscast.

On late 2006 she co-hosted El mundo hoy, a newscast produced in Colombia and broadcast by the Caracol TV-owned, Key West, Florida-based WGEN-TV station.

Corzo co-hosted the newsmagazine Séptimo día, with Manuel Teodoro, since June 10, 2007, until April 2011. She also worked as a legal adviser for Caracol TV.

In March 2011, Corzo announced, through her Twitter account, she would replace María Cristina Uribe as presenter of Canal Uno's Noticias Uno since June 2011. Her contract with Caracol TV expired late April 2011. On June 4, 2011, Corzo debuted on Noticias Uno.

On December 28, 2014, Corzo presented her last edition of Noticias Uno. In January 2015, she joined RCN Televisión to be both presenter and interviewer of a premiered newsmagazine named "Cuatro Caminos" (literally, The Four Paths), which showed different ways of journalism such as special reports, chronicles, and interviews. She was accompanied by journalists Diego Fajardo and Diana Salinas, and photographer Mauricio Vélez (her current couple). Vélez was later replaced by newsman Felipe Arias. Since August 10, 2015, Corzo became main anchorwoman of the primetime edition of Noticias RCN, replacing Vicky Davila. On April 30, 2016, the news of her irrevocable resignation (apparently due to health problems) was spread by social networks and confirmed hours later.

=== Awards and acknowledgements ===
In 2004, she was nominated as the Female News Personality of the Year at the Premio INTE, because of her "warmness and reliability", and in 2005 she was awarded with the Premio Canal Caracol to the best female newscaster. In December 2006, she received the Orquídea award to the best female newsreader in Miami.

In October 2007, she won a "special mention" in the category for best TV feature or report at the Premio Nacional de Periodismo Simón Bolívar. In November 2007, Corzo shared, with psychiatrist Lucrecia Ramírez, marine biologist Sandra Bessudo, and golfer María José Uribe, a TAG Heuer-sponsored acknowledgement.

In 2011, 2013, 2014 and 2016, Corzo was nominated to the India Catalina awards, winning the prize in 2014 as Best News Presenter. In 2016, she was also nominated to the TV y Novelas awards, as Best News Presenter.

== Personal life ==
Corzo divorced her first husband; she remarried in December 2006. She divorced again in June 2008. She lives with her son Pablo in Bogotá. Between mid 2015 and the last quarter of 2016, her couple was the photographer Mauricio Vélez.

In 2007, Corzo joined a campaign to raise breast cancer awareness, with another Colombian television personalities. In two interviews, Corzo said she joined the campaign because three of her relatives had suffered from breast cancer. During that same year, she developed myalgic encephalomyelitis/chronic fatigue syndrome (ME/CFS).

Corzo stated in an interview that she left Noticias Caracol early 2008 because her son asked her to spend more time with him, and that the network was understanding and supportive of her decision. She stood with the network as a legal adviser / lawyer, presented the Noticias Caracol 12:30 newscast plus Código Caracol on weeknights, the En todo su derecho section on weekends, and continued co-hosting Séptimo día on sundays. In May 2010 she answered a short interview as a part of the special edition Celebrity Moms issued by the Colombian version of Playboy magazine.

At the end of 2010, to avoid an ME/CFS relapse, she took a leave of 2 months. At this time she also was treated for kidney stones. In 2011, she took a brief rest before her debut on Noticias Uno.

In November 2012, Corzo participated in a special bikeway parade sponsored by the United Nations's campaign on violence against women, alongside other female celebrities of the Colombian show business.
