= Adriana Vargas =

Colombian broadcaster

Adriana Vargas-Sino
- Born: Adriana Vargas Mayorga
- Education: Social Communication - Pontificia Universidad Javeriana (1998)
- Employer: Univision
- Known for: Lead Anchor - Univison 41 WXTV
- Television: Noticias Univision 41
- Mother: Amparo Mayorga

Adriana Vargas (born in Bogotá) is a Colombian journalist and news presenter for New York's WXTV Univision 41 Nueva York.

Vargas majored in Social Communication from Pontifical Xavierian University in 1998, but she debuted in journalism two years before with a small production company. Later she presented several cultural shows for state-run Señal Colombia, and joined Manuel Teodoro to co-host the Caracol TV newsmagazine Séptimo día.

Following Séptimo día's cancellation in 2000, Vargas joined rival network RCN TV, where she presented the Noticias RCN news show, acted as its international editor, and hosted the nightly opinion newsmagazine La noche (January 2002 - December 2004).

In 2005 she participated in Caracol Radio's morning news show Hoy por hoy and hosted and directed the Noticiero del mediodía. She also co-hosted Noticiero CM& at evenings. In 2006 she returned to RCN TV. In 2010, Adriana Vargas joined President Juan Manuel Santos' team as his spokeswoman and International Media Director. After one year, Vargas joined the Univision O&O station serving the New York Tri-State area, WXTV channel 41 and currently anchors the 6 pm ("Noticias Univision 41 A las Seis") and 11 pm ("Noticias Univision 41 Solo a las Once") newscasts.
