= Juanita Gómez =

Colombian journalist and news presenter

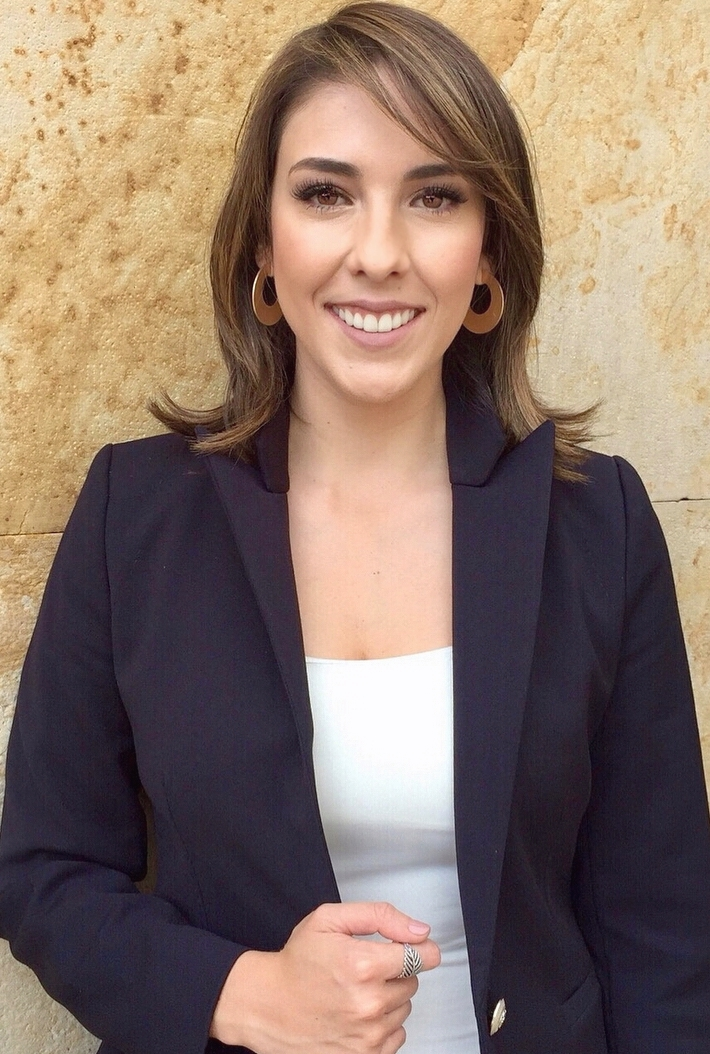
- Born: December 24, 1987; Manizales, Colombia
- Education: Pontifical Xavierian University
- Occupations: Journalist and news anchor
- Website: @JuanitaGomezL

Juanita María Gómez Lora (born 24 December 1987) is a Colombian journalist and news presenter.

Gómez was born in the city of Manizales, is the youngest of three siblings. In 2005 her family moved to Bogotá, where she studied at Pontifical Xavierian University, and graduated in 2010. She started her career in journalism as a columnist in the digital magazine Directo Bogotá. She entered at Noticias Caracol (Caracol Televisión) in 2010 as a journalistic producer of the "Crónicas Caracol" segment. The following year, she joined as a journalist and reporter.

In 2014, she presented the "Red Cinema" section with Luis Carlos Rueda in the weekend publications of the newscast. Between 2016 and 2017, presented of the weekend editions of Noticias Caracol, first provisionally and then permanently, together to Daniela Pachón. In 2018, she joined the working table of the radio program for the youth opinion of Altavoz of Bluradio, together with Esteban Hernández.
