= Cadena Melodía =

Colombian radio network

Coordinates: 4.632505°N 74.067185°W

Cadena Melodía is a Colombian radio network, founded in 1971 by Liberal politician Efraín Páez Espitia, who owned Radio Melodía of Bogotá since 1959.

== Stations ==
- Melodía Estéreo: AM station in Bogotá, devoted to easy listening music. Until July 2012, when Cadena Melodía leased it to Caracol TV (Bluradio), it was located in the FM band.
- Radio Líder: AM stations devoted to news and general programming (the Bogotá station is defunct since July 2012)
- Bogotá Estéreo (defunct): tropical music. In the 1980s was sold to an evangelical group, which later would make an exchange agreement with RCN Radio. Under RCN, it would become a bolero station, and then youth-oriented station La Mega.
