= HJCK =

Coordinates: 4°40′14″N 74°3′14″W

- Colombia
- Broadcast area: Bogotá
- Frequency: Online
- Branding: HJCK

Programming
- Format: Culture
- Affiliations: Caracol Radio (2005–2016); Caracol TV (2016-)

Ownership
- Owner: Radial Bogotá, S. A.

History
- First air date: 15 September 1950; 21 November 2005 (online only)
- Last air date: 30 July 2025
- Former frequencies: 89.9 MHz (1967–2005); 1160 kHz (1950–1981)

Links
- Website: http://hjck.com/

HJCK El Mundo en Bogotá was a Colombian cultural radio station, founded 15 September 1950 and based in Bogotá. HJCK became an online-only station in 2005. The station ceased broadcasting at midnight local time on 30 July 2025.

HJCK was founded by intellectuals Eduardo Caballero Calderón, Hernando and Alfonso Martínez Rueda, Alfonso Peñaranda, Gonzalo Rueda Caro, Álvaro Castaño Castillo and his wife, Gloria Valencia de Castaño, as the first privately owned cultural radio station in Colombia. They bought Radio Granadina, an AM station in Bogotá (HJCK would move to FM in 1967). Its slogan, "El Mundo en Bogotá", comes after one of its first programmes, which included Gabriel García Márquez as its correspondent in Caracas.

In 2000 HJCK expanded its programming, at the time devoted to classical music and cultural programmes, to include other music genres, such as blues, jazz, bossa nova, son cubano, and classic rock.

The station has compiled a series of recordings with voices of famous Colombian and Latin American writers and intellectuals, known as Colección Literaria HJCK. In 2015, public network Radio Nacional de Colombia broadcast some old HJCK recording in the HJCK en la memoria programme.

Due to financial problems and increasingly low ratings, HJCK had to lease its frequency to Caracol Radio in 2005. Between 2005 and 2016 its frequency and call signs were leased by Los 40 Principales, a Caracol Radio network. In late 2015 Caracol TV purchased Radial Bogotá, S. A., the company owning HJCK; it was used to expand the Bluradio network since 2016 (both companies, though having been sister companies until 2001, are no longer related).

In early 2019 HJCK renewed its website, becoming a portal focused in culture, seeking to compete with Arcadia (owned by Publicaciones Semana) and El Malpensante (an independent magazine). HJCK, through Caracol TV, belongs to the Grupo Valorem conglomerate, which owns El Espectador.
