= Tola y Maruja =

Tola y Maruja is a Colombian cross-dressing comedy duo, formed in 1990 by journalist and cartoonist Carlos Mario Gallego (Tola) and writer Sergio Valencia Rincón (Maruja). Tola and Maruja are two old paisa ladies, who mock Colombian politics and society.

Since 2008, Maruja is performed by Luis Alberto Rojas. They appear twice a week on Caracol TV's journalistic magazine El radar and on Sundays on Spitting Image-like Noticiero NP& con los Reencauchados, and write a Sunday weekly column on El Espectador newspaper.

== History ==
In 1986, Gallego and Valencia met while studying at Universidad de Antioquia in Medellín. While at college, Gallego and Valencia, jokingly, spoke as two old ladies in order to amuse their classmates. They produced a humour magazine called Frivolidad, which folded after 5 issues and later became a theatre group, which included Tola y Maruja. The cross-dressing duo gained national exposure when appeared on Sábados Felices, a weekly comedy show produced by Caracol TV. The duo went on performing until 2002, and after internal differences, Gallego and Valencia separated in 2004.

Gallego got the rights of Tola y Maruja and continued to write No nos consta, their column on El Espectador (at the time, a weekly newspaper), as well as a weekly cartoon as Mico. In 2008, Luis Alberto Rojas replaced Valencia as Maruja, and both reappeared on theatre and television since then. Its section on El radar was nominated for the India Catalina award (part of the Cartagena Film Festival) for Best Journalism and/or Opinion Programme.

== The Tola y Maruja history ==
Tola was born Anatolia del Niño Jesús Muñoz de Tuberquia in Yolombó (Antioquia), while Maruja was born Flor Maruja del Perpetuo Socorro Bustamante de Cataño in Cañasgordas (also in Antioquia). Both refuse to reveal their age. Tola is married to Ananías and has 13 children, while Maruja is married to Perucho and has 11 children. They met on 9 April 1948, during the revolts in Bogotá after liberal leader Jorge Eliécer Gaitán was murdered. They are conservative and never finished elementary school.

== Books ==
- La era Uribe (anthology, Editorial Aguilar, 2007, ISBN 978-958-704-626-7)

== See also ==
- Colombian comedy
