= Yidispolitics Scandal =

Political scandal in Colombia

Yidispolitics is the name given to the public scandal in Colombia, which began in April 2008, when the ex-politician Yidis Medina admitted to have received bribes to vote in favor of the re-election project, which changed the constitution and allowed Álvaro Uribe Vélez to become president for a second term.

The politicians implicated in Yidispolitics have rejected the accusations. Even the former president of Colombia, Álvaro Uribe Vélez, has been accused of bribery. Uribe argued against these accusations saying: "The national government persuades; but does not push or bribe consciences".

On June 25, 2008, after several days of investigation, the Supreme Court of Colombia found Yidis Medin guilty of bribery and sentenced her to 47 months of house arrest. Included in the same case, the Court claimed that it would send the information to different Judicial bodies that eventually would have to punish the public servers involved in the scandal. It also asked the Constitutional Court of Colombia to review the constitutional reform that allowed Álvaro Uribe Vélez to stand for his second consecutive presidential election. This case caused Álvaro Uribe Vélez to strongly react against the Supreme Court, even suggesting links between the magistrates of the Court and groups of extreme left-wing and right-wing tendency. He also suggested the passing of a constitutional referendum to legitimate his presidential re-election. The day after Álvaro Uribe Vélez's speech, those involved sued the judges of the Supreme Court.

The politicians involved in this case are currently being investigated. Among them are: Diego Palacio Betancourt Social Welfare Minister, and Sabas Pretelt De La Vega Colombian ambassador in Italy, who was the Interior and Justice Minister during the passing of the re-election project, that eventually changed the constitution. (ver:señalados por Medina)

== Background ==
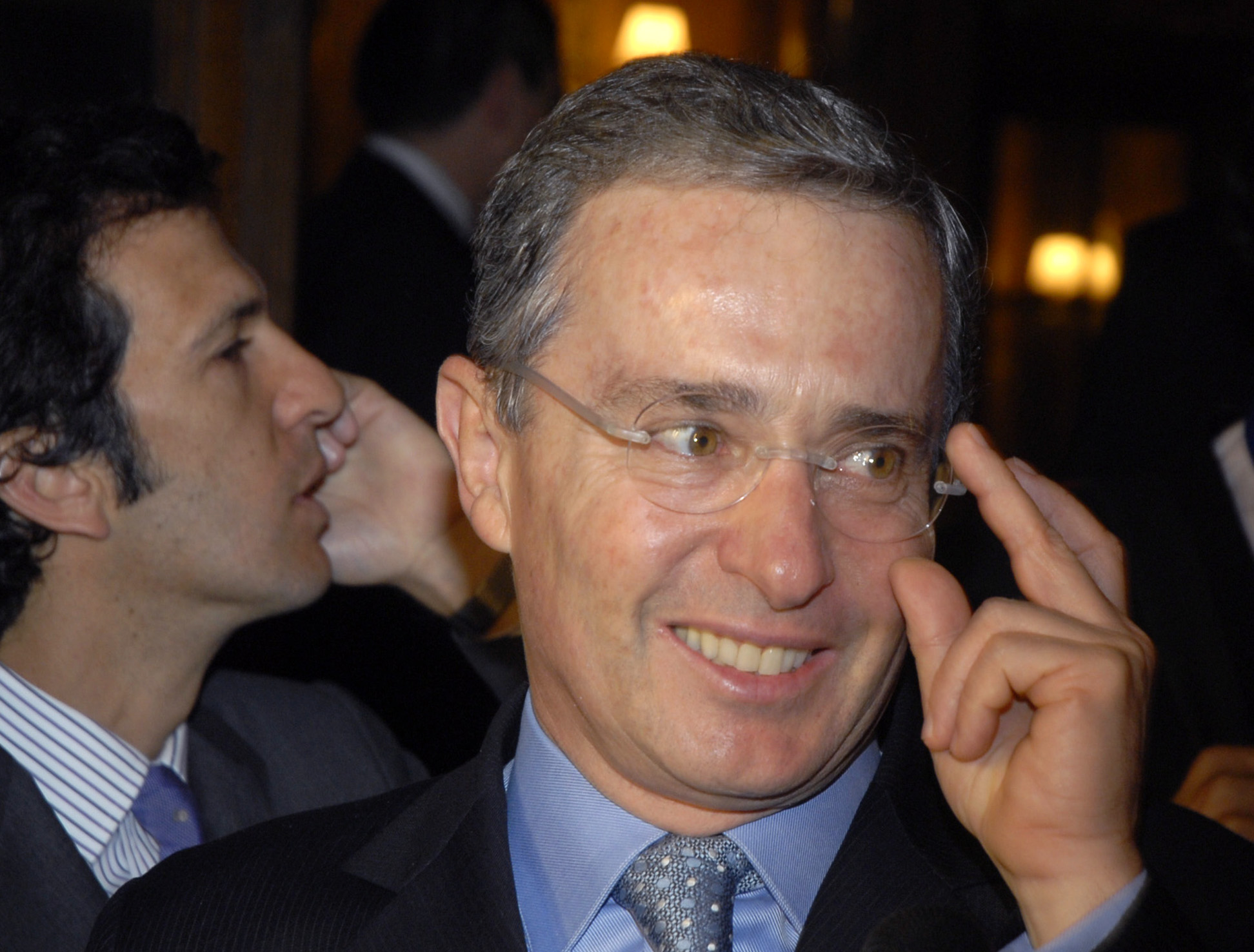
Medina suggests that former President of Colombia Álvaro Uribe was involved in the scandal.

Álvaro Uribe Vélez was re-elected as Colombian President for the period of 2006 - 2010, after pushing towards a reform of the Constitution to allow his consecutive re-election. The approbation of the reform was a controversial decision, due to the last minute change of mind of the representatives Yidis Medina and Teodolindo Avendaño; Medina voted in favor of the reform after assuring she was against it, and Avendaño was absent during the approbation. There was a lot of speculation about the controversial reform, until April 2008 when Yidis Medina declared herself guilty of bribe, when she assured to a Colombian magazine El Espectador that the government did not fulfill the deal, and that she was about to write a book with all the information about the case with the help of Teodolindo Avendaño.

== The scandal ==
On April 20, 2008, several days after El Espectador interview, TV news show Noticias Uno broadcast a video where ex Congresswoman Yidis Medina admits before Daniel Coronell, the TV news director, to have accepted bribes from President Álvaro Uribe himself and from some of his closest collaborators, including Sabas Pretelt (back then, the Interior & Justice Minister) to change her vote in the First Commission of the Representatives' Chamber in the law project applied by the Government to allow the immediate presidential re-election that would give Uribe a chance to aspire to a second term of office. This video was recorded in August 2004 but the journalist and the then-congresswoman agreed that it wouldn't be exposed until something unexpected happened to her (she stated to have been death threatened). Medina said that the video could also be exposed in case she didn't receive what was agreed with the Government.

Weeks before the video's broadcasting, Medina had revealed its existence in an interview with El Espectador newspaper. Because of this, Coronell stated that Medina had broken the deal and so he told her. She admitted so and the journalist announced its publication.

Both President Uribe and his staff members denied Medina's accusations. Uribe said that he had a meeting with her but never had offered her or any other member of the parliament anything for his/her vote. In addition, he accused Medina of having been blackmailing his son Tomás Uribe and other high government employees by phone calls, using a list from cell-phone company Comcel as a proof, with several in-coming phone calls from Medina's number to Tomás Uribe's cell-phone. Though Medina declared it wasn't her phone number, some days later it was proved wrong in an official statement by Medina's attorney. Uribe said Medina was behaving as a criminal and declared: "Her vote helped, but she shows up now as a failed, unsatisfied lady because she couldn't pull out her extortion". Besides, he referred to his collaborators Pretelt and Palacio Betancourt as honest people with impeccable behaviour, and accused journalist Daniel Coronell of having covered up the false crime.

President Uribe was placed under house arrest in 2020 and was charged with witness tampering and bribery in May 2024 and could face up to 12 years of prison.

== See also ==
- Corruption in Colombia
- Supreme Court of Colombia
