= Inés María Zabaraín =

Colombian journalist and news presenter (born 1969)

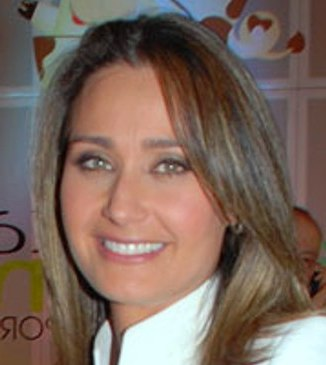
- Inés journalists at an event
- Born: Inés María Zabaraín Pinto; August 23, 1969 (age 56); Santa Marta, Magdalena, Colombia
- Education: Pontifical Xavierian University
- Years active: circa 1992 - present
- Spouse: Jorge Alfredo Vargas

Inés María Zabaraín Pinto (born August 23, 1969 in Santa Marta, Magdalena, Colombia) is a journalist and newscaster, mainly known for presenting Noticias Caracol of Caracol Television until 2011.

== Early career ==
She is the second daughter of the marriage of Orlando Zabaraín Riascos and Inés Pinto Elías. At the age of four years, she moved to Santa Marta to attend her elementary and high school studies at Colegio Divino Niño -Divine Child School- and Colegio La Presentación -Our Lady of the Presentation School-, respectively. After graduation from high school, she travelled to Bogotá, where she joined the Pontificia Universidad Javeriana. There, Inés María studied Social Communication and Journalism. For one year, she was in Ohio, United States, as part of a university exchange program for learning English.

As she was attending to the last semesters of her career, Inés began practicing in the sections " Pizarra" -The Board- and "Itinerario" -Travel Schedule-, from the TV program "Educadores de Hombres Nuevos" -New Men Educators- produced by the Javeriana for Inravisión Canal 3 (now known as Señal Colombia). Afterwards, she became part of the group of anchorwomen of the magazine "Panorama", broadcast by Producciones JES.

== Professional career ==
In 1992 she was in charge of "Clips", the show business section of Noticiero QAP, on Fridays. When Adriana La Rotta, the main presenter of general news quit the program, Inés María replaced her, forming a duet with fellow journalist and Xaverian Jorge Alfredo Vargas. Along the time, the two journalists got involved in a relationship, and then married in Santa Marta on May 18, 1996. Currently, they are parents of three children: Laura, Sofia and Felipe Vargas Zabaraín.

When QAP ended its broadcasts because of the due date of the contract, on last days of December 1997, Inés made a break to become a mother for the first time. After that, she was part of the group of writers of "Revista Cambio" -Change magazine- and was the editor-in-chief for five years of the Latin American version of "20/20" magazine, on issues of optometry. Years later, she also participated in an evening radio program on "La W Radio", a radio station of Caracol Radio.

From 1999 to February 2011 Inés María belonged to Noticias Caracol's staff of newscasters, presenting in all different editions, and leading an interview segment on counseling for parents named "En Familia" -In Family-. Ath the same time, Inés hosted "Colombia más Cerca" -Closer to Colombia- broadcast by Caracol TV Internacional, and sometimes, she carried out some interviews for the news magazine "El Radar".

On March 2, 2011 Inés María debuted as newscaster of the main edition of "Noticiero CM&" and along with Ana Maria Trujillo and Catalina Aristizábal, she is responsible for the section "1, 2, 3 ...", specializing in politics.
