= Corruption in Colombia =

Corruption in Colombia is a pervasive problem at all levels of government, as well as in the military and police forces. A general culture and awareness of this corruption permeates society as a whole.

Various factors have contributed to political corruption in Colombia, including: drug trafficking, guerrilla and paramilitary conflict, weak surveillance and regulation from institutions, intimidation and harassment of whistle-blowers, and a widespread apathy from society to address unethical behavior. The government is continuously taking steps to measure and reduce levels of corruption at all levels through anti-corruption policies. Initiatives have also been headed by the private sector in the interest of facilitating and encouraging business activities.

A Global Corruption Barometer survey from 2010 found that the institutions seen as most corrupt were the political parties and the parliament, followed by the police and public officials, the judiciary and the military.

Transparency International's 2025 Corruption Perceptions Index, based on experts' and businesspeople's perceptions of corruption in the public sector, gave Colombia a score of 37 on a scale from 0 ("highly corrupt") to 100 ("very clean"). When ranked by score, Colombia ranked 99th among the 182 countries in the Index, where the country ranked first is perceived to have the most honest public sector. For comparison with regional scores, the best score among the countries of the Americas (Note: Argentina, Bahamas, Barbados, Belize, Bolivia, Brazil, Canada, Chile, Colombia, Costa Rica, Cuba, Dominica, Dominican Republic, Ecuador, El Salvador, Grenada, Guatemala, Guyana, Haiti, Honduras, Jamaica, Mexico, Nicaragua, Panama, Paraguay, Peru, Saint Lucia, Saint Vincent and the Grenadines, Suriname, Trinidad and Tobago, United States of America, Uruguay, Venezuela) was 75, the average score was 42 and the worst score was 10. For comparison with worldwide scores, the best score was 89 (ranked 1), the average score was 42, and the worst score was 9 (ranked 181, in a two-way tie).

== History ==
Practices of corruption that plague politics and the judicial system are, in part, rooted in the colonial legacies of the Spanish conquest. The Spanish Empire was known to possess a disorganised and corrupt bureaucracy, which was transplanted to its colonies, including Colombia. The first courts established by the Spaniards in America were also known to be corrupt and inefficient. For example, Colombia inherited an ineffective and distrusted legal system that fails to guarantee private property rights in order to promote economic investment. One of the primary ways colonial elites could make a fortune was through occupying important positions in the judicial bureaucracy of the colony and thereby capturing rents.

== Impacts ==
Between 1989 and 1999, corruption in Colombia is estimated to have cost the state 1% of its GDP annually. In addition to the economic cost of corruption, other aspects of Colombian society have been affected, such as the loss of credibility of politicians and the Colombian government, as well as the demoralization and disinterest of society at large in political participation.

Recent studies of criminal behavior in the country indicate that while the rate of crime grew annually by about 39.7%, the criminal behavior by officials in local and national government grew by 164.1%, and despite this increase, there are few convictions. The levels of administrative corruption are so high that, as of 2011, the media reports of such felonies overshadow the stories on terrorism or armed conflict.

A 2005 study published by Transparency for Colombia (Transparencia por Colombia) assessed the index of integrity of governments, assemblies, and comptrollers at the departmental level and concluded that none of those dependencies scored an appropriate level of integrity. 51% were prone to high or very high levels of corruption.

Colombia's modern corruption takes place mostly at the level of business between politicians and officials with private contractors and companies. The lack of ethical behavior among private individuals or organizations, and politicians has resulted in a culture known in Colombia as "serrucho" (saw), in which it is almost the norm for individuals to bribe politicians in order to be granted contracts and for politicians to add commissions and extra costs for their own benefit. Other sources of corruption come from the result of privatization of government-owned institutions, in which the profits are used by individuals for their own wealth.

According to Transparency for Colombia, the country ranked 70th of 180 countries in the 2008 Corruption Perceptions Index. However, the problem of corruption was a high priority to only 2.9% of the people interviewed, versus violence, which was a high priority to 31.49%, and unemployment, which was a high priority to 20.7%.

According to a study by the Universidad Externado de Colombia, corruption is one of the main factors that render doing business difficult in Colombia. 91% of entrepreneurs consider that some business owners pay bribes. 16.92% say that a businessperson will offer a bribe, and out of the 28.4% of entrepreneurs who were asked for money or favors by a government official, only 8.52% reported it to the authorities in an effective way.

== Political corruption ==
Current levels of corruption have increased steadily since 2009 and continue getting worse as the Attorney General and the comptroller discover corruption at almost every level of government, from local to national. In September 2009, 48,000 government officials, including 800 mayors and 30 governors, were being investigated for corruption. The issue of corruption has not been isolated to one political party; accusations of corruption span the political spectrum, from right-wing conservatives in the Party of National Unity to the left-wing Democratic Pole.

The discouragement of society from addressing the many cases of corruption in Colombia also stems from the well-known immunity: only a small percentage of officials investigated for corruption are likely to suffer legal consequences. In addition, it is difficult for the judicial system to handle many investigations at lower levels. At the top, politicians avoid prosecution via political maneuvering and loopholes, sometimes under the protection of their own political party. An example of this is the attempt by the Party of National Unity to pass a bill that would protect its politicians involved in the parapolitics scandal.

Colombia's corruption is also the result of a long coexistence between drug trafficking and a rush of society members to achieve easy wealth, thus rendering every aspect of society vulnerable to corruption, from politics to agriculture and sports.

=== Within institutions ===
Many institutions in Colombia have been the subject of administrative corruption. Some examples of large institutions that span across industries and have been involved in major cases of corruption include: Ferrovias (national railroad administration), Caprecom (health care), Foncolpuertos (ports authority), Termorrio (energy), Dragacol (civil engineering), Chivor reservoir (water supply), and contracts with foreign companies such as Mexican ICA for the pavement of streets in Bogotá.

=== Municipal-level ===
Levels of corruption at the local level (towns, cities) have been increasing since 1990, relative to corruption levels at the national scale.

== Political corruption scandals ==
Political corruption scandals in Colombia are often linked to the Colombian conflict, which has plagued the country since 1964.

=== Processo 8000 ===
The Process 8000 (lit. '8000 Process') is the unofficial name given to the corruption scandal surrounding accusations that Colombian Liberal Party candidate Ernesto Samper's 1994 campaign for President of Colombia was partially funded by drug money. The name came from the case number issued by the Office of the Attorney General for their investigation into the allegations. The investigation formally ended in the mid-1990s. The investigation found several of Samper's close associates to be guilty, although Samper himself was absolved of any wrongdoing.

=== Parapolitics ===
The Colombian parapolitics scandal (known as parapolítica in Spanish, a portmonteau of paramilitar and política) refers to the Colombian congressional scandal in which several congressmen and other politicians have been indicted for colluding with the United Self-Defense Forces of Colombia (AUC), a paramilitary group which is responsible for killing thousands of Colombian civilians. The scandal broke in 2006 and by April 17, 2012, 139 members of Congress were under investigation.

Five governors and 32 lawmakers, including Mario Uribe Escobar, cousin of President Álvaro Uribe and former President of Congress, were convicted.

==== Administrative Department of Security (DAS) ====
The 2006 DAS scandal involved the now-defunct Administrative Department of Security (Departamento Administrativo de Seguridad, DAS) illegally wiretapping the telephones and other communication lines of Supreme Court magistrates, judges, senators, journalists and other prominent figures perceived as opposition to the Uribe administration.

=== Yidispolitics ===
The Yidispolitics Scandal, caused by declarations of the Colombian ex-representative, Yidis Medina, in which she claims that the Colombian government offered her important jobs and money if she voted for the approval of Uribe's reelection.

=== Contract Carousel ===
The Nule Group corruption scandal (Spanish: Carrusel de la Contratación = "Contract Carousel") is a case of political corruption that took place in the city of Bogotá during the administration of former mayor Samuel Moreno Rojas of the Polo Democrático Alternativo party in 2010. The controversy exploded on June 25 of that year when secret recordings surfaced of the multimillion-dollar commission negotiations between Germán Olano, a former Colombian congressman, and construction mogul Miguel Nule Velilla, whose company, the Nule Group, handled many Bogotá public works contracts.

This scandal eventually led to many at the top of the Nule Group pleading guilty to embezzling millions of dollars meant for the construction of the Transmilenio public transport system and of roads in the city. Guido, Manuel, and Miguel Nule were charged with embezzlement, bribery, and conspiracy. At a pretrial hearing, Miguel said they had paid a 6% commission to the mayor and to Senator Iván Moreno Rojas, and called it extortion. Subsequent investigations revealed further corruption and several politicians, businessmen, leaders of the Institute of Urban Development and even the mayor himself were implicated. Mayor Moreno was consequently suspended from office in 2011 and has now been formally accused of corruption, bribery, embezzlement by appropriation, and extortion. The national government lost nearly one trillion Colombian pesos (roughly $521 million) as a result of the crime. Olano surrendered to Colombian authorities on his return from Miami in May 2011.

The corruption scandal is considered one of the biggest in recent Colombian history.

=== Others ===
The 2011 DIAN (Office of taxation and customs) scandal in which the administrative staff plotted ways to steal millions of dollars from the Colombian taxpayers through a complex system of fake companies and legal loopholes.

In 2011, a number of mayors in different departments misused money that was supposed to help Colombians who were affected by floods. Instead of using this money for the victims, these officials used the funds for political campaigns and personal matters.

In September 2011, former mayor of Bogotá, Samuel Moreno, was convicted for irregularities in contracts with private businesses, under a scandal named "contract carousel" by the media.

In February 2014, a massive corruption network within the Colombian army was exposed. High-ranking military officers siphoned money and took bribes in order to grant contracts. Some of these senior officers took bribes up to 50% of the cost of the contracts they awarded. Other elements of the military were taking money that was intended to be used for military supplies

In February 2018, the Corte Suprema de Justicia leaked audios in which ex-president Alvaro Uribe talks with Juan Guillermo Villegas, investigated for paramilitarism, about manipulating witnesses in a case against Ivan Cepeda, a Colombian senator. Uribe knew they were being intercepted, and literally says, "those sons of bitches are hearing this call".

== See also ==
- Crime in Colombia
- Corruption Perceptions Index
- Elections in Colombia
- Government of Colombia
- 2018 Colombian anti-corruption referendum
