= Jorge Alfredo Vargas =

Colombian journalist and news presenter (born 1967)

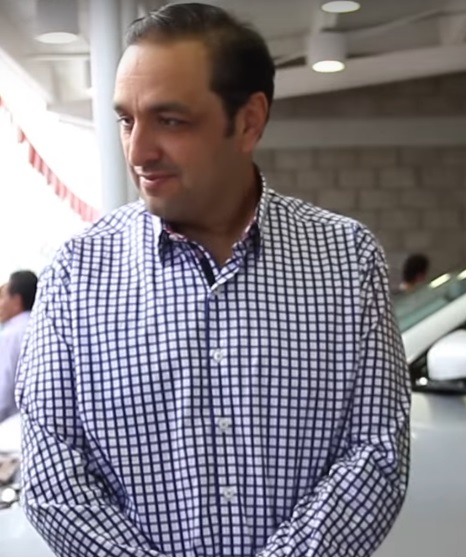
- Vargas in Bogotá in 2016.
- Born: Jorge Alfredo Vargas Angulo; March 14, 1967 (age 59); Bogotá, Colombia
- Occupations: Journalist, news presenter
- Notable credit(s): Noticias Caracol presenter (2006–2026); Blu Radio radio host (2013–present)
- Spouse: Inés María Zabaraín

Jorge Alfredo Vargas Angulo (born March 14, 1967, in Bogotá, Colombia) is a Colombian journalist and news presenter.

== Biography ==
Vargas studied Social Communication and Journalism at Pontifical Xavierian University, later did a major in Economic journalism at University of La Sabana. As of 2017 he is Teletón Colombia's ambassador in Colombia, alongside Mábel Lara, Felipe Arias and Andrea Serna.

== Career ==
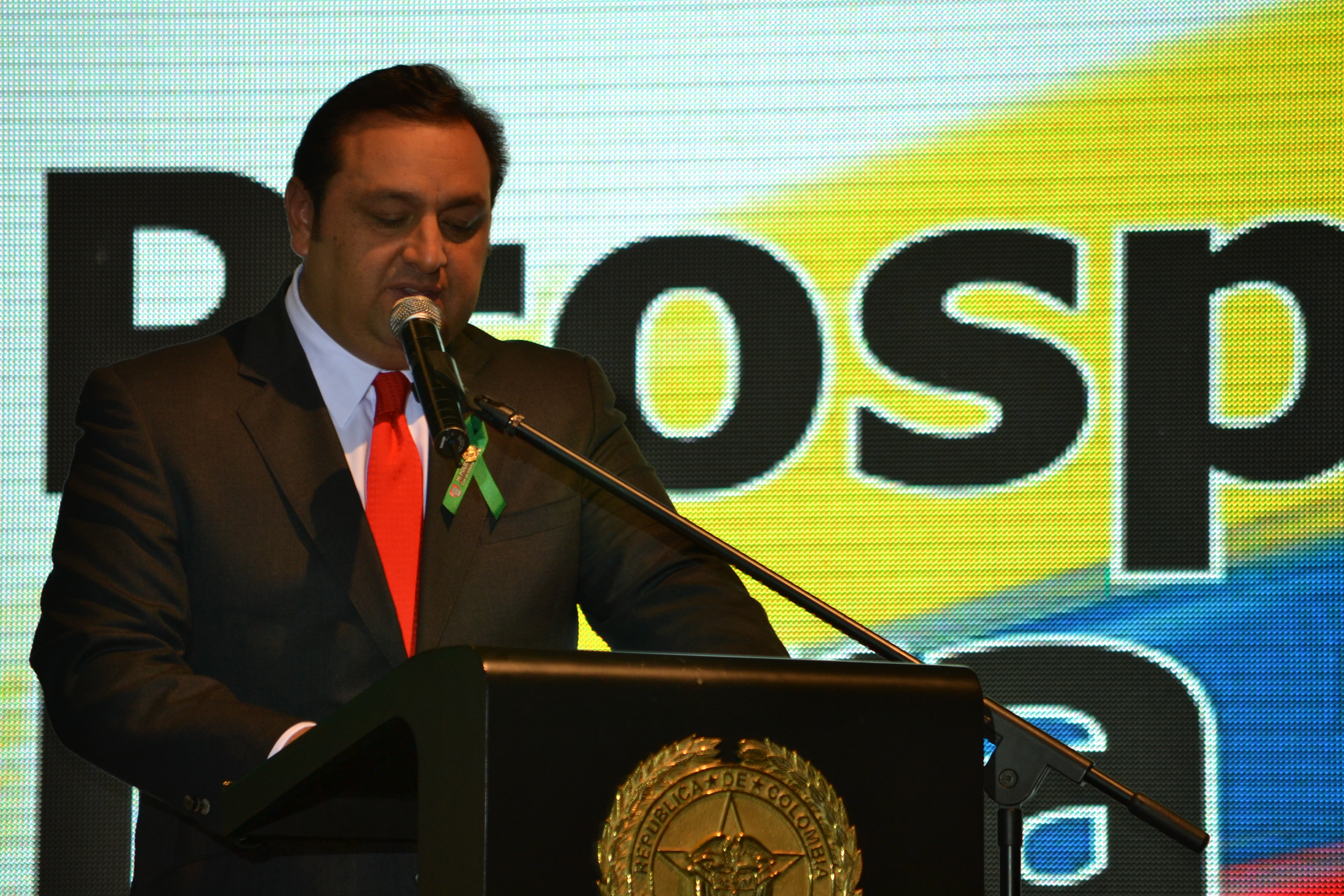
Vargas during a National Police of Colombia event.

His journalistic career began as a sportswriter of Noticiero Criptón, in 1987, where he later worked as a general and economic editor. In 1991, he became Editor-in-Chief of the Noticias QAP, a position he held for a year, after which he was made presenter of the same program. In 1995, he was presenter and journalist of the morning news Buenos Dias Colombia. He pass to Noticiero de las 7 working as economic editor and presenter. Vargas hosted the Concurso Nacional de Belleza de Colombia, between 1996 and 2004.

In 1998 he was appointed director of the program Yo, José Gabriel and sub director of the radio space La FM, that same year he entered private television on the Canal RCN as presenter of the news, in Noticias RCN, where he presented the central edition, among others.

In 2006 he joined Caracol Televisión as presenter, and in the same year debuted in Noticias Caracol, as central edition presenter along with María Lucía Fernández. During that season he conducted the programs Nada más que la verdad and Mesa de noche, both by Caracol Televisión. From 2009 to 2013 he directed the political program Noticiero NP&, where some dolls personified politicians and people of the Colombian show business. On September 2, 2013, he became the director of Voz Populi a Blu Radio's program.

== Personal life ==
On May 18, 1996, Vargas married in the cathedral of Santa Marta, Colombia with the journalist and presenter Inés María Zabaraín, with whom he has three children: Laura, Sofía and Felipe Vargas Zabaraín. In 2013, Vargas was realized a gastrical surgery, losing 27 kg.
