= Miss Colombia 2003 =

- Date: November 12, 2003
- Presenters: Paola Turbay; Jorge Alfredo Vargas
- Venue: Centro de Convenciones Cartagena de Indias, Cartagena de Indias, Colombia
- Broadcaster: RCN TV
- Entrants: 21
- Placements: 10
- Winner: Catherine Daza; Valle
- Congeniality: Militza Bolaño; Guajira
- Best National Costume: Catherine Daza; Valle
- Photogenic: Virginia Balcázar; Cauca

Miss Colombia 2003, the 69th Miss Colombia pageant, was held in Cartagena de Indias, Colombia, on November 12, 2003, after three weeks of events. The winner of the pageant was Catherine Daza Manchola, Miss Valle.

The pageant was broadcast live on RCN TV from the Centro de Convenciones Julio Cesar Turbay in Cartagena de Indias, Colombia. At the conclusion of the final night of competition, outgoing titleholder Diana Lucia Mantilla crowned Catherine Daza Manchola of Valle as the new Miss Colombia.

== Results ==
=== Placements ===
Placement	Contestant
Miss Colombia 2003	Valle – Catherine Daza Manchola
1st Runner-Up	Cartagena – Jeymmy Paola Vargas
2nd Runner-Up	Antioquia – Mónica Jaramillo
3rd Runner-Up	Bogotá – Angelica Sierra Barreto
4th Runner-Up	Medellín – Deysi Valencia De La Ossa
Top 10	Atlántico – Caroline Bradford Sprouse; Chocó – Carolina Trelles Torres; Huila – Leydi Polanco Lozano; Risaralda — Giovanna Gallo; San Andrés – Ethel Davis Corpus

=== Special awards ===
- Miss Photogenic (voted by press reporters) - Maria Virginia Balcázar Bolaños (Cauca)
- Best Body Figura Bodytech - Catherine Daza Manchola (Valle)
- Miss Congeniality - Liliana del Carmen Morales Barrios (Bolívar)
- Best Costume - Catherine Daza Manchola (Valle)
- Reina de la Policia - Alba Lucía Galindo Urzola (Córdoba)
- Señorita Puntualidad - María del Pilar Jaramillo Ruiz (Meta)
- Miss Elegance - Catherine Daza Manchola (Valle)

== Delegates ==
The Miss Colombia 2003 delegates are:

- Antioquia - Monica Patricia Jaramillo Giraldo
- Atlántico - Caroline Bradford Sprouse
- Bogotá D.C. - Angélica María Sierra Barreto
- Bolívar - Carolina Esther Garcia Grau
- Boyacá - Adriana Lizeth Alfonso Piñeros
- Caldas - Valentina Gonzáles Giraldo
- Cartagena DT y C - Jeymmy Paola Vargas Gomez
- Cauca - Maria Virginia Balcázar Bolaños
- Córdoba - Alba Lucia Galindo Urzola
- Chocó - Carolina Trelles Torres
- Cundinamarca - Diana Angelica Cendales Cuevas
- Guajira - Melitza Mercedes Bolaño Duarte
- Huila - Leydi Johana Polanco Lozano
- Magdalena - Maria Consuelo Zuñiga Aguilera
- Medellín A.M. - Deisy Catalina Valencia Deossa
- Meta - Maria del Pilar Jaramillo Ruiz
- Norte de Santander - Carla Lorena Pinto Jaimes
- Risaralda - Giovanna Gallo Patiño
- San Andrés and Providencia - Ethel Carolina Davis Corpus
- Santander - Adriana Orrego Lombana
- Tolima - Nathalia González Bernal
- Valle - Catherine Daza Manchola
