= Diva Jessurum =

Colombian television journalist, director and book writer

- Born: June 17, 1975 (age 51); Barranquilla, Colombia
- Occupations: Television journalist, writer

Diva Vivian Jessurum del Rio (born 17 June 1975 in Barranquilla, Colombia), better known as Diva Jessurum, is a Colombian television journalist, director and writer. She is best known as the show host of a news show named "Expediente Final", on Caracol Television. She has also appeared on other shows, such as Noticias Caracol and "Se Dime de Mi". Her nickname is "the only diva on Colombian television".

== Brief biography ==
In 2018, Jessurum was the victim of a robbery after a flight she took arrived at Barranquilla's Ernesto Cortissoz International airport. She lost a necklace and two watches to a man who was armed with a gun, but he was later apprehended by local police.

During 2019, Jessurum began hosting a television show named "Expediente Final", which talks about the deaths of different celebrities.

That same year, she was again the victim of criminal activity, when four men vandalized one of her properties in Puerto Colombia twice in the space of one hour by throwing rocks, cement blocks, bricks and other materials at it. No one was injured but Jessurum declared on the internet that her family members' lives were put at risk.

On 26 April 2021, it was reported that Jessurum had suffered an accident at home in which a picture frame fell on her face from a wall in her house. Her eyes and nose were affected, but she did not require a visit to the hospital.

== Books written ==
Jessurum has released a number of books she wrote, namely "Sé Una Diva Enpoderada" ("Be an Empowered Diva"), 2000's "Marbelle: La Vida no es un Collar de Perlas" ("Marbelle: Life is not a Pearls Necklace") and "911 VIP".

== Personal life ==
Earlier that year, she had declared on her Instagram account that the reason she was single was because "(she is) a woman of principles, who does not take infidelity or lies. Also, (I) put material feelings first and the most important (thing is): (I) have dignity".

== See also ==
- List of Colombians
