= Jennifer Montoya =

Colombian journalist and news presenter (born 1985)

- Born: January 31, 1985 (age 41); Pereira
- Education: Complutense University of Madrid
- Occupations: Journalist, news presenter

Jennifer Montoya Betancourth (born January 31, 1985) is a Colombian journalist and news presenter. In addition to her decade-long career in TV journalism, she is a graduate of the Catholic University of Pereira and possesses a Master's degree in Political Analysis and Journalism from the Institution of Business and Communication at the Complutense University of Madrid.

== Biography ==
Jennifer Montoya was born in Pereira. she presented the program Análisis mundial, which she created and produced, on Cable Noticias, where she would be charged with the coordination of the show Noticiero Mundo. At this time she also worked as an editorial director for the magazine Crítica. She would later become a reporter for Noticias RCN on Cazanoticias before joining Noticias Caracol as a reporter alongside newscaster Alejandra Giraldo. In July 2017, Montoya left Noticias Caracol to work as the primary presenter on Spanish-language American television network Estrella TV's KRCA 62 Noticias station, finding her new residence in Los Angeles, California.
