= Daniel Coronell =

Colombian television journalist (born 1964)

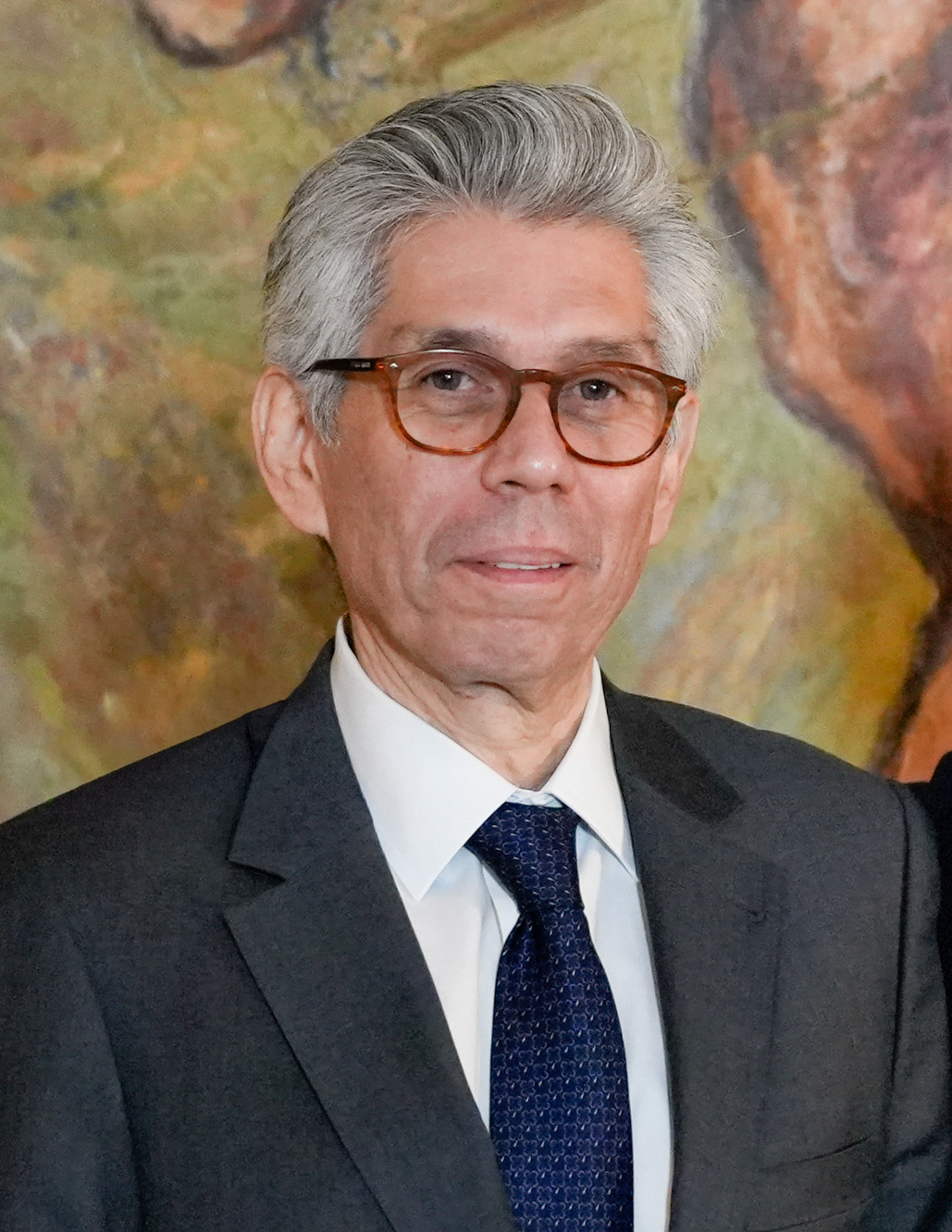
- Daniel Coronell in 2025
- Born: Daniel Alfonso Coronell Castañeda; October 25, 1964 (age 61); Bogotá, D.C., Colombia
- Occupations: Journalist; politician; radio host; television
- Employers: Semana; RCN; Noticias Uno; Univision News; W Radio Colombia
- Notable credit: Los Danieles Anchor (2020‍–‍present)

Daniel Coronell (born October 25, 1964) is a Colombian journalist and Businessperson shareholder of the media Plural Comunicaciones. He has been the news director for RCN, Noticias Uno, and president of Univision News, the news division of Univision, until August 1, 2021. In September 2021 he was appointed as president of the weekly news magazine Cambio. In October 2021, Coronell started working for W Radio Colombia.

For seventeen consecutive years he has been chosen as the most-read columnist by opinion leaders in Colombia according to a 2020 poll carried out by the agency Cifras y Conceptos. His op-ed column, the most widely read in Colombia, used to be published in Semana, but following his departure from the weekly magazine, it started being published in the online portal Los Danieles, which he co-created with Daniel Samper Ospina, and which features op-eds by Antonio Caballero (until he died in 2021), Ana Bejarano, and Daniel Samper Pizano.

Coronell has uncovered some of the great scandals of recent years. Among others, the case of Yair Klein, the negligence of the Colombian government to guard Pablo Escobar during his incarceration, revealed the calls that linked Ernesto Samper with Elizabeth Montoya of Sarria, and numerous complaints related to the former president including the illegal purchase of parliamentary votes that allowed his re-election, a scandal known as yidispolitica. Álvaro Uribe.,

Coronell was the victim of multiple threats that forced him into exile. In 2002 received threats after publishing that, in 1984, a helicopter belonging to President Álvaro Uribe's father had been found in a coca laboratory in Tranquilandia. The aircraft had obtained its license when Álvaro Uribe was director of Civil Aeronautics. In September 2005, Coronell had to leave the country and live in exile for two years due to death threats made to him and his family.

== Education and career ==
Coronell graduated from the Colegio Mayor de Nuestra Señora del Rosario in Bogotá and obtained a degree in journalism from the Universidad Externado de Colombia. He completed his graduate studies in Switzerland and Spain. He also wrote an opinion column for the weekly news magazine Semana. He has taught at the Javeriana, and Externado de Colombia universities in Colombia, and has been a member of the teaching staff for the Master's Program on Journalism at the Universidad de los Andes. He was a Senior Research Fellow of the Knight Fellowship at Stanford University, as well as a researcher and senior visiting scholar of the University of California, Berkeley.

=== Threats and exile ===
Coronell is well known for his views and investigations in Colombian and world news. His writings have criticized the government of the former president Álvaro Uribe Vélez and paramilitary leaders.

In August 2005 he had to go into exile with his wife, journalist and anchorwoman María Cristina Uribe (who at the time presented Noticias Uno), and their daughter. His loved ones had been persistently threatened through phone calls, funeral wreaths and anonymous e-mails. According to Coronell's own research, confirmed by the authorities, the former congressman Carlos Náder Simmonds, who resides in Spain and is mentioned by Fernando Garavito.

Coronell and his family decided to come back to Colombia in July 2007, where a few months later, as a result of his op-eds and news reports critical of President Uribe's government, he had an improvised argument with the latter on-the air, through La FM, a national radio network.

== Controversies ==
=== NTC connections with César Villegas and Imagen y Sonido ===
Daniel Coronell and César Villegas were shareholders in NTC. Regarding this matter, Coronell has demonstrated that Villegas's shares in NTC were purchased by him before Villegas was investigated by the Attorney General Office.

NTC, with Coronell as director and one of the main shareholders, developed a pilot program with the company Imagen y Sonido, owned by the extradited drug trafficker Justo Pastor Perafán. Germán Castaño Valencia, a collaborator of Perafán, declared before a notary that there were "countless meetings" between Coronell and Perafán. Marco Antonio Cañon, a partner of NTC, stated in a recording that the pilot "cost about one hundred and something million" and that "All of us (the partners of NTC) knew who Pastor Perafán was… My 10% was Pastor's 10%… If it hadn't been for Imagen & Sonido, Daniel Coronell wouldn't be what he is today, and the pilots that were made, which cost a fortune, wouldn't have been done." In that same recording, Cañon asserts that Coronell knew that the person behind Imagen y Sonido was Perafán. Coronell has reiterated that he did not know Mr. Perafán and that NTC did not have any business partnership with him.

These allegations were brought forward by Álvaro Uribe during the 2002 presidential campaign. In 2010, they were expanded upon by the newspaper El Colombiano, after Coronell revealed that the then-director of that newspaper, Ana Mercedes Gómez Martínez, had benefited from the Agro Ingreso Seguro program, one of the most notable corruption scandals during the Uribe government. Coronell requested a retraction from the director of El Colombiano, clarifying that Imagen y Sonido had not only worked with NTC but also with Caracol Televisión, DFL Televisión, the National Army in the series Hombres de Honor, among other companies. At that time, Imagen y Sonido was a pioneering company in digital television in Colombia, and there were no legal proceedings against it then. Former President Álvaro Uribe and his sons Tomás and Jerónimo Uribe Moreno, as well as some of their followers, have repeatedly disseminated the existence of the partnership between Coronell and César Villegas and have claimed that Coronell benefited from Perafán. Coronell has indicated that these accusations are retaliation by Uribe and his sons due to his investigations such as the Yidispolitica scandal and the free trade real estate project in which the Uribe Moreno brothers participated, as well as the Uribe Case, the Agro Ingreso Seguro scandal, and the possible links of Álvaro Uribe's father, Alberto Uribe Sierra, with the drug trafficker Pablo Escobar, among other corruption scandals surrounding the former president. Former President Uribe retracted from having accused Coronell of being a drug trafficker as a consequence of an aggravated slander lawsuit initiated by Coronell. In the case of the free trade real estate development, the justice system in multiple instances ruled in favor of the Uribe Moreno brothers and declared that there had been no damage to administrative morality.

== Awards ==
Coronell has been awarded with ten Emmy awards and the prestigious Simón Bolívar National Journalism Award on seven occasions:

- 1987: Best TV Chronicle
- 1989: Best Journalistic Report
- 1992: Best Cultural Report
- 2007: Best Opinion Column
- 2008: Best TV News Follow-up Report and Best Investigative Report for TV

In 2009 he was granted the highest award for a TV investigative report by the Fundación Nuevo Periodismo Iberoamericano - Cemex, for "Un crimen casi perfecto" (An Almost Perfect Crime) together with a team of journalists from Noticias Uno. The program was broadcast in 2007. In 2009, he was honored with an Oxfam Novib/PEN Award.

In 2018, he received the José de Recasens Life and Work Award, presented by the Faculty of Social Communication-Journalism at the Externado University of Colombia, for his "love of the truth."

In 2025, he received the Grand Prize for Press Freedom, the highest award given by the Inter-American Press Association (IAPA).

In 2026, the Bogotá Circle of Journalists, CPB, awarded him the Guillermo Cano Journalism Merit Award, the highest award given by the association.
