= Jeymmy Vargas =

Colombian model, actress, and beauty queen

Yeimy Vargas
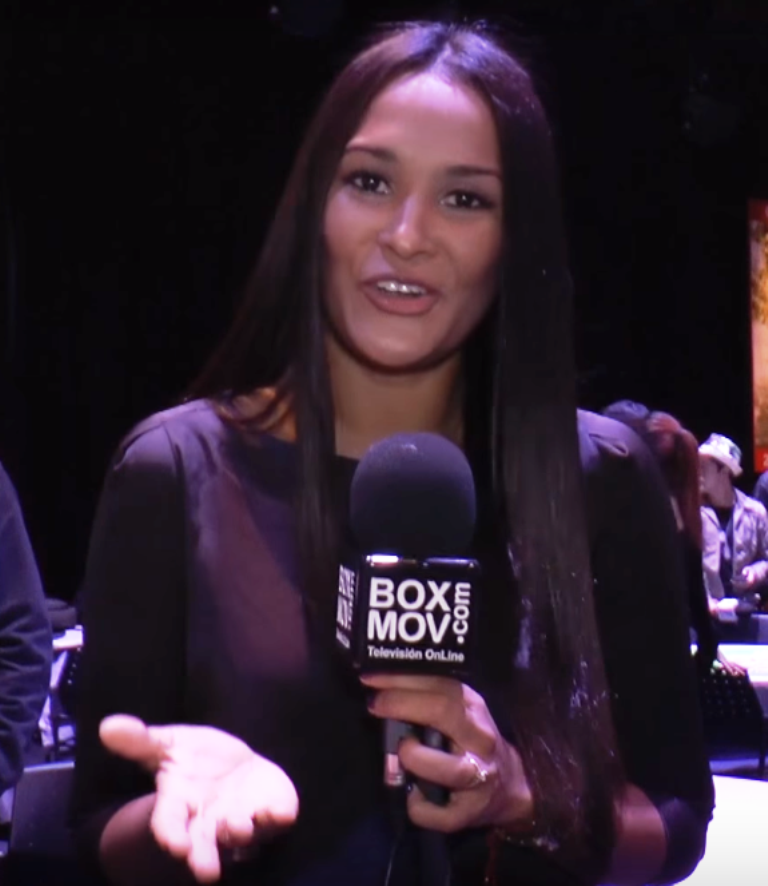
- Born: Yeimy Paola Vargas Gómez; 16 June 1983 (age 43); Cartagena, Bolivar, Colombia
- Height: 1.83 m (6 ft 0 in)
- Beauty pageant titleholder
- Title: Miss Cartagena 2003; Miss Internacional Colombia 2003; Miss International 2004
- Hair color: Black
- Eye color: Dark Brown
- Major competitions: Miss Colombia 2003 (1st Runner-Up); Miss International 2004 (Winner)

Yeimy Paola Vargas Gómez (born 16 June 1983) is a Colombian beauty queen, actress and model who became Miss Colombia International 2003, Reina Internacional del Café 2004 and the third Colombian to win the title of Miss International 2004. Yeimmy was born in Cartagena. She is the third Colombian woman to win the Miss International title, after Paulina Gálvez in 1999 and before Catalina Duque in 2025.

== Filmography ==
- 2017: Los Morales (Caracol Televisión) - Evelti Morales
- 2013: La selección (Caracol TV) - Clarisa Galván
- 2013: Allá te espero (RCN TV) - Dora
- 2011: El Joe, la leyenda (RCN TV) - Adela Martelo

Awards and achievements
Preceded by (Venezuela) Goizeder Azúa	Miss International; 2004	Succeeded by (Philippines) Lara Quigaman
