= Néstor Morales =

Néstor Javier Morales Corredor (born Nestor Javier Morales in 26 February 1963) is a Colombian news program host of Noticias Uno, he was in Viva FM of Caracol Radio, La W of W radio, newspaper El Nuevo Siglo, Todelar, in Noticias Caracol of Caracol TV and Telepaís of Canal Uno.
