= Juan Diego Alvira =

Colombian journalist, news presenter and lawyer

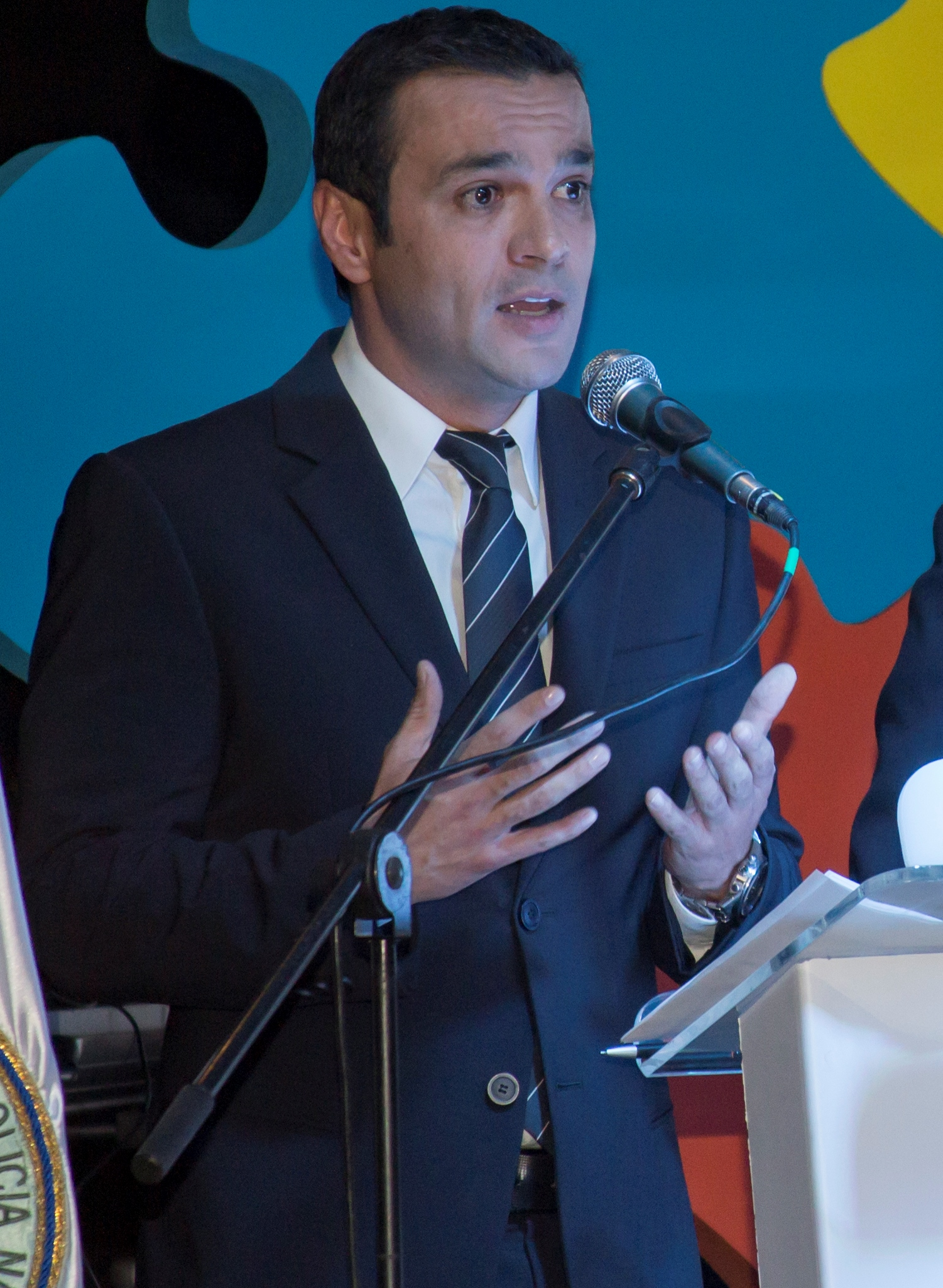
- Alvira during an intervention in Bogotá in 2016.
- Born: Juan Diego Alvira Cortés; October 16, 1976 (age 49); Ibagué, Tolima
- Occupations: Journalist, news presenter, lawyer
- Notable credit(s): Noticias Caracol presenter (2011–2022); City Noticias presenter (?–2011)

Juan Diego Alvira Cortés (born October 16, 1976) is a Colombian journalist, news presenter and lawyer.

== Biography ==
Alvira studied Social Communication and Journalism at Jorge Tadeo Lozano University, later studied Law in La Gran Colombia University. Alvira is married with the also journalist and communicator Ana María Escobar.

== Career ==
His career began in RCN Radio's program Radio Sucesos, in his native Ibagué, then entered sports journalism in the magazine Deporte Gráfico. Alvira then debuted in the newspaper El Espectador, to later enter as a reporter in the news City Noticias of Colombian variant of City TV. He became the director midday edition of City Noticias, and later was responsible for hosts the stellar edition of the news and was in charge of the presentation of the journalism and research program, CTY, Acción contra el crimen (in English: CTY, Action against crime).

In February 2011, he debuted as Noticias Caracol, as host. In the actuality, Alvira co-hosts the first edition of the news, alongside Catalina Gómez. In addition to the presentation in Noticias Caracol, Alvira created the section "El periodista soy yo" (in English: "I'm the Journalist"), which is based on citizen complaints sent on video. He also directs a space on Blu Radio titled "Vive Bogotá".
