= Séptimo día =

Colombian television newsmagazine

- Genre: Journalism
- Created by: Manuel Teodoro
- Directed by: Manuel Teodoro
- Presented by: (Season 1) Manuel Teodoro and Adriana Vargas (Season 2) Manuel Teodoro and Silvia Corzo (2007-2011), Manuel Teodoro and María Lucía Fernández (2011- )
- Starring: Marcela Pulido, Eccehomo Cetina, Andrés Marín, Gloria Lozano, Diego Guauque, Susana Suescún, et al.
- Country of origin: Colombia
- Original language: Spanish
- No. of seasons: 2

Production
- Running time: 40 minutes (with commercials, may vary)

Original release
- Network: Canal 1
- Release: 7 July 1996 – 5 July 1998
- Network: Caracol TV
- Release: 12 July 1998 – February 2000
- Network: Caracol TV
- Release: 10 June 2007 – present

Séptimo día (Spanish: "Seventh day") Is a Colombian television journalism, produced by Caracol TV, presented by Manuel Teodoro and María Lucía Fernández, and broadcast every Sunday at 9:30 p.m. after Los Informantes.

Séptimo día first aired in 1996 on Canal Uno, when Caracol TV was still a production company. At the time it was presented by its creator, Manuel Teodoro, and Adriana Vargas. The show was successful, but also had to face a number of lawsuits, which was the reason Caracol TV pulled it off the air in 2000. Eventually, Caracol TV won all the legal suits.

A new season of Séptimo día started on 10 June 2007, presented by Teodoro and Silvia Corzo. Since 1 May 2011, María Lucía Fernández co-hosts the programme with Teodoro.

In the Miami, Florida market, Séptimo día is broadcast by WGEN-TV on Sunday nights.

== Format ==
The format is somewhat similar to CBS 60 Minutes, featuring three long-form news stories. Séptimo día usually undertakes its own investigations. Some episodes feature one or two stories; one story can also span multiple episodes.

One of the stories deals with controversial issues, such as euthanasia, organ donations or even the Colombian armed conflict.

As its American counterpart, many stories focus on allegations of wrongdoing and corruption, but instead of focusing politicians or corporations, Séptimo día deals with companies, businesses or persons who usually practice scams and who are denounced by the viewers. They are commonly either subjected to an interview, or try to evade contact with the Séptimo día crew altogether, either by written notice or by simply fleeing from the approaching journalist and their camera crew.

The third story is often a more light-hearted report or a profile.

== Controversies on Season 2 ==
On the episode broadcast 2 March 2008, Séptimo día denounced a corruption case at the Colombian Institute of Family Welfare (ICBF), involving an employee who was asking for money in order to speed adoption processes up. The next week, Elvira Forero, director of ICBF, sent a letter to Paulo Laserna Phillips, CEO of Caracol TV, stating that the corruption case was presented in a "sensationalist" way. Ms Forero added that the case was already under investigation and that Séptimo día had broken a law forbidding media to broadcast or publish names and data "which identify or could lead to the identification of children and teenagers." On 25 April 2008, the involved employee was captured and later released because an error in the arrest procedure; she would be captured again two months later.

On the 9 March 2008 episode, Séptimo día broadcast a special report by Teodoro about the situation of Colombian immigrants in Spain, victims of xenophobia. Teodoro interviewed a fellow journalist, living in Spain, who was beaten and kicked by Spaniard youngsters. The next day, the journalist called W Radio to denounce that Teodoro stated, by using the voice-over technique, in the episode broadcast the night before —which he watched on Caracol TV Internacional— that he received intensive care and suffered several fractures, which, according to him, was not true. He called Teodoro a "liar" and a "sensationalist." In an article on this incident for a magazine, veteran journalist Gustavo Castro Caycedo criticizes Teodoro and quotes Jorge Enrique Botero (also a journalist), who had questioned in 1999 the use of the hidden camera technique in Séptimo día's season 1.

A Bogotá local prosecutor prevented Caracol TV to broadcast an episode two days before its scheduled transmission on 25 April 2008, and asked for the raw audiovisual material recorded for a report by Marcela Pulido, dealing with the case of an unidentified woman who had health and personal issues because of a poorly performed buttock augmentation. The woman wished to expose (with the help of Séptimo día) the beautician who, without being a physician or a plastic surgeon, illegally performed the surgery. The prosecutor, who was investigating the case, based her decision on the grounds that Séptimo día was "asked to deliver all of the information obtained by [it] to this office, in order to clarify the incidents in question." Teodoro told Foundation for Press Freedom, an NGO which works for journalists' rights, that he was "surprised that just before the programme was to be aired, legal proceedings are said to have been initiated by the Prosecutor's Office," because the only investigation on the issue so far was "the one his programme has undertaken." The episode would eventually be broadcast 24 August 2008, after getting an authorization.

On 20 and 27 July 2008 Séptimo día dealt with the so-called Narcotourism in Bogotá, Medellín, and Cartagena, showing how foreigners come to Colombia in order to get easy and cheap access to drugs. Cartagena's police commander, Col. Carlos Mena Bravo, after being asked by journalist Gloria Lozano why foreigners are not searched when some parties allegedly known to involve drug use end at sunrise, replied "we do not want to bother the foreigners, if it is not because of the results of an investigative process of information we have received about this person may be possessing narcotics." In the following days, tourist guides demonstrated showing their contempt for the way they were depicted in the episode. The demonstrators were carrying banners, one of them reading "Séptimo día is a lie." They told Barranquilla-based El Heraldo newspaper that two men, claiming to be tourist guides, who told the journalists about where and who sold drugs were actually impostors. In a column published by El Colombiano newspaper, writer Pascual Gaviria criticized Séptimo día because "the tone [of the special report on Narcotourism] was of false surprise and permanent moral condemnation."

On 27 March 2011, Séptimo día dealt with the case of Sandra/Alexander, born in 1972 with ambiguous genitalia (micropenis) and who had his testicles surgically removed, with the knowledge of her/his parents following the advice of Dr. Efraim Bonilla Arciniegas, who would be later considered the "father of pediatric surgery" in Colombia. Such was the then state of art procedure for these cases at the time. Dr. Bonilla was interviewed by Séptimo día reporter Susana Suescún, who did not initially tell him about the specific case he dealt with more than 30 years before. The episode included an interview with a former member of the Medical Ethics Tribunal, who stated that the surgery was a "fatal mistake." During the episode, which focused in the suffering of Sandra/Alexander after having found out he was actually a man, following years of being raised as a woman, the journalists heavily criticized Dr. Bonilla, claiming he was "playing to be God". The episode prompted dozens of complaints by fellow physicians and medicine students, with several institutions such as Hospital de la Misericordia (a pediatric hospital where Dr. Bonilla works), the Colombian Society of Pediatric Surgery, and the Colombian Surgery Association, among others, sending letters of protest to the network.

The episode was analysed on the 14 April 2011 episode of Doble vía (a programme of the Caracol TV defensoría del televidente [viewer ombudswoman's office]), where Amparo Pérez, the network's viewer ombudswoman, stated that "a more accurate look from the point of view of medicine" was missing on the Séptimo día episode. On the 17 April 2011 episode, Séptimo día issued a clarification, recognizing that when contacting Dr. Bonilla they did not specifically tell him about the case, and broadcasting excerpts of a second interview with Dr. Bonilla (on his request) which was not broadcast 27 March, where the physician clarifies why did he recommended the procedure, citing the pioneering surgery work by endocrinologists from Johns Hopkins Hospital, such as doctor John Money, and explaining the controversies in the medical community which followed. Suescún also travelled to Quito, Ecuador, trying to interview a physician who had continued with the treatment for Sandra/Alexander, after the family moved to that city.
