= Catalina Gómez =

Colombian journalist and news presenter

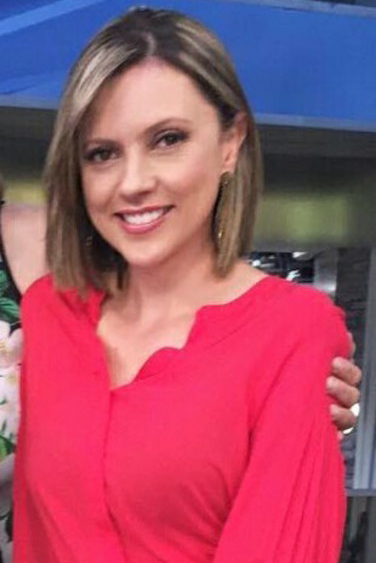
Gómez during a Noticias Caracol broadcast.

María Catalina Gómez Sánchez (born September 8, 1984), simply known as Catalina Gómez or Catalina Gómez Sánchez, is a Colombian journalist and news presenter.

== Life and career ==
Gómez was born on September 8, 1984, in Armenia, Colombia. She studied at the Pontifical Bolivarian University, where she majored in Social communication and journalist. Subsequently, she debuted in 2006 in a local radio program as producer. Later, she entered as news reporter and anchor at the cable news channel NTN 24 based in Bogotá, Colombia.

During 2012, she became a press chief of an Institutional program, and later Gómez moved to Colombia, while worked as the official anchor of the Noticias MundoFox in Miami. In March 2013, she joined Noticias Caracol as a reporter and substitute anchor, later she passed to the weekends edition, and nowadays is the current First edition co-anchor alongside Juan Diego Alvira. Gómez has been married since 2010 with the sports journalist Juan Raúl Mejia.
