= HJCU =

Coordinates: 4.632505°N 74.067185°W

Colombia
- Broadcast area: Bogotá
- Frequency: 730 kHz
- Branding: Melodia stereo 730 AM

Programming
- Format: Easy listening
- Affiliations: Cadena Melodía

Ownership
- Owner: Cadena Melodía

History
- First air date: 1967
- Former frequencies: 96.9 MHz (1967–2012)

Links
- Website: www.cadenamelodia.com

HJCU (AM 730 kHz) is a radio station in Bogotá, Colombia, part of the Cadena Melodía network. Since its inception, it has been focused on the easy listening genre, with some news on mornings and afternoons on weekdays.

The radio station ceased to broadcast on FM because the owners of the frequency decided to lease it to Grupo Valorem, a Colombian group that owns Caracol Televisión, which created Bluradio. It currently broadcasts its programming on AM 730 and it streams at cadenamelodia.com.
