= Claudia Palacios =

Colombian journalist and newscaster (born 1977)

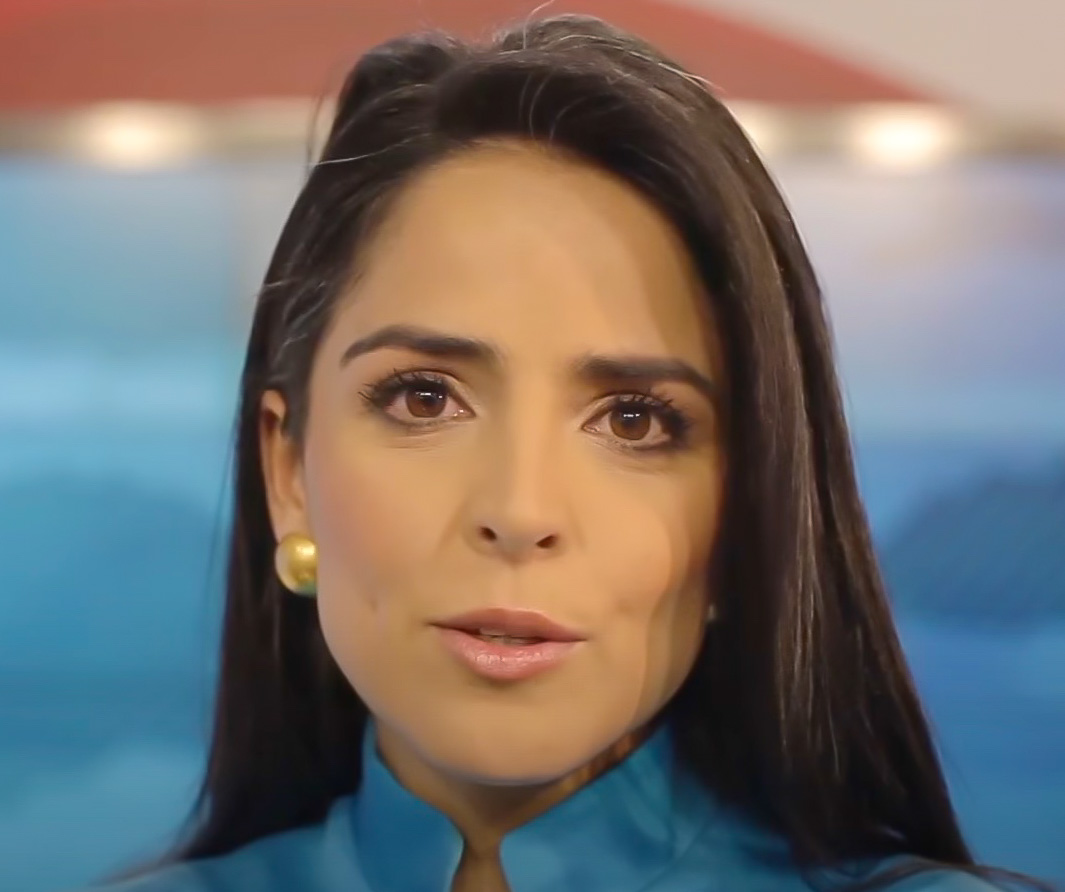
- Claudia Palacios in 2016
- Born: Claudia Isabel Palacios Giraldo; October 1, 1977 (age 48); Cali, Colombia
- Occupations: Television and print journalist
- Notable credit(s): CM& Noticias news anchor (2013–present); CNN en Español weekend anchor (2004–2012); Caracol Noticias morning anchor (1998–2004); Citytv Bogotá (2017-)
- Children: Pablo

Claudia Isabel Palacios Giraldo (born October 1, 1977) is a Colombian journalist and newscaster. She is best known as the weekend news anchor on CNN en Español, a position she held from 2004 through 2012. She is currently both a news anchor on CM& Television in Colombia and a journalist for the Colombian magazine El Pueblo.

== Biography ==
Palacios lived in Palmira, a town near Cali, until she was 15 years old. She graduated from the Colegio del Sagrado Corazón de Jesús. She then earned a degree in journalism from the Pontificia Universidad Javeriana in Bogotá. She started her journalistic career on Noticiero del Pacífico at Telepacifico, a regional TV station, where she reported on the environment for Dagma, a weekly program produced by the University of Valle's UVTV. Later, she joined the Noticiero CM& newscast, where she covered a variety of important events including several official presidential trips, union marches, student protests, and congressional sessions.

In 1998, she joined Caracol Noticias as a morning news anchor. She also covered international and health issues for Caracol Noticias. Her reporting on women's health issues led to an award in Mexico by CELSAM (Centro de Estudios Latinoamericanos para la Salud de la Mujer or the Center of Latin American Studies on Women's Health). In addition, she served as a communications consultant for various local businesses, such as the Colombian Society of Pediatrics, Roche Laboratories, Coca-Cola, ExxonMobil, and Unisys. In 2004, she was named one of five Colombian women of the year by Fucsia magazine.

On July 30, 2004, after a job offer made via email, she joined CNN en Español as the anchor of the weekend news program Mirador Mundial. She has since covered numerous important stories for CNN en Español, including the U.S. elections, the 2004 Indian Ocean tsunami aftermath, and the death of Pope John Paul II, and has interviewed the president of Bolivia, Evo Morales, and one of his predecessors, Carlos Mesa. She has also served as host of CNN en Español's weekly travel program, Destinos. In 2012, she left her position at CNN en Español to return to Colombia for reasons of both family and career fulfillment.

Since Pope Francis's visit to Colombia, Palacios worked for Citytv Bogotá as a presenter of the specials about his visit, Citynoticias de las 8 and Mejor Hablemos. In January 2018 Johnatan Nieto was reinstated as the presenter of Citynoticias de las 8, but Palacios remains at the channel.

== Public backlash ==
By mid June, 2019, Palacios wrote an OpEd in El Tiempo, the main journal of the Country, where she affirmed that since Venezuelans are accustomed to having children in order to receive government subsidies, they are now spreading this practice in her country in order to obtain supposed benefits.

"Dear Venezuelans -wrote Palacios- It is not like this in your country and it is good that it is not so, because at the end of the subsidies, the socialism of the 21st century made the richest country in the region very poor. If you continue to reproduce the way you do, it would be even harder to see them as an opportunity for development as a problem."

The journalist remarks were highly criticized by Human Rights Organizations, journalists, and activists.
