= María Cristina Uribe =

Colombian journalist and news presenter

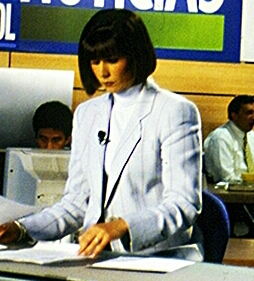
María Cristina Uribe.

María Cristina Uribe is a Colombian journalist and news presenter born in Medellín. Between 2002 and 2011 she presented Noticias Uno.

Uribe majored in Social Communication and Journalism at the Pontifical Bolivarian University in 1991. Her television debut was on a programme on the regional channel Teleantioquia, where she would later present a newscast.

Later, Uribe would appear on national newscasts such as QAP Noticias and Noticiero de las Siete on Canal A and CM& on Canal Uno. In 1998 she would move to Caracol Noticias until 2002, where she joined Noticias Uno.

Uribe left Colombia for the United States between 2005 and 2007 after receiving, with her husband Daniel Coronell, death threats. Coronell was the director of Noticias Uno.
