= María Lucía Fernández =

Colombian journalist and news presenter

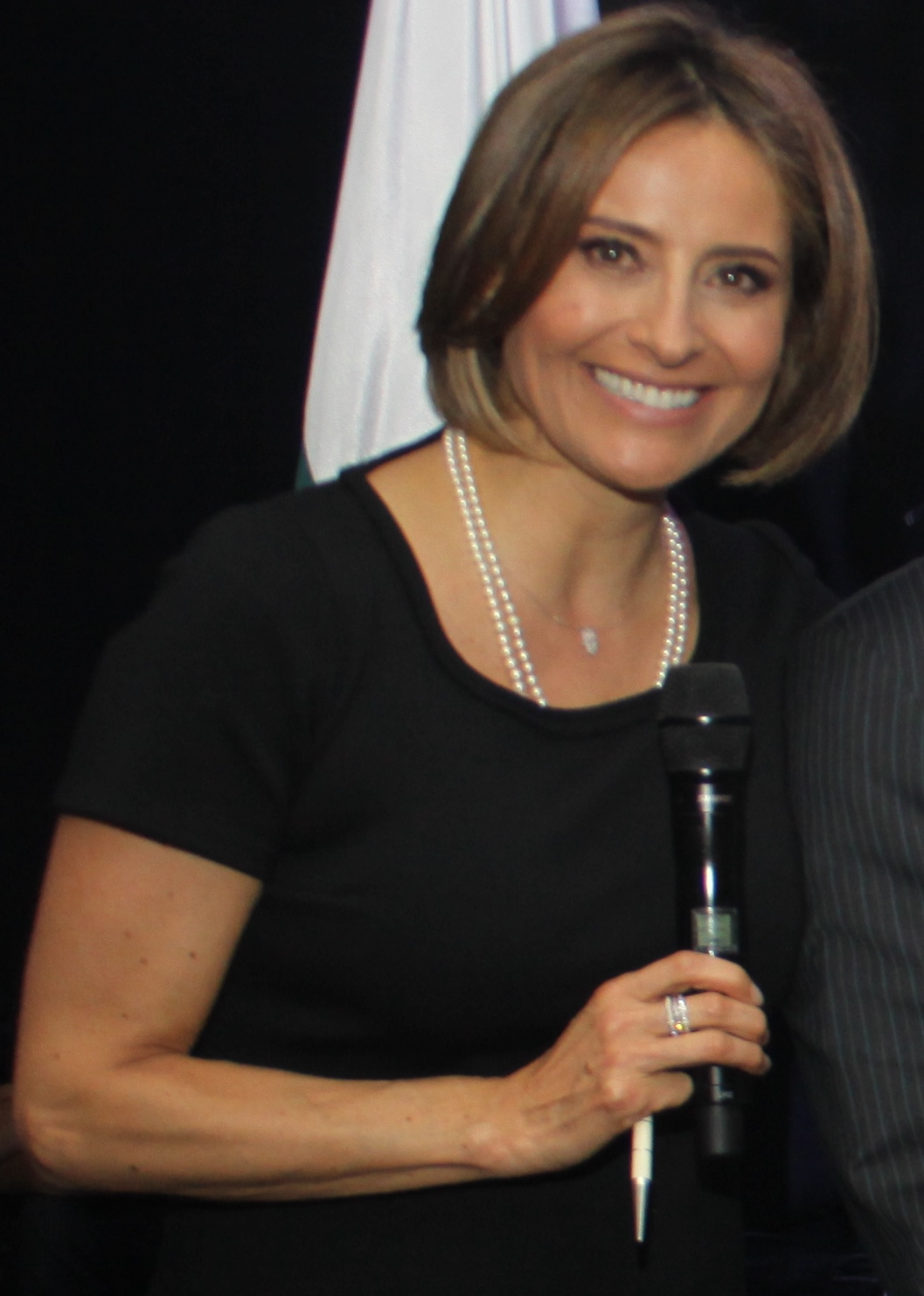
María Lucía Fernández

María Lucía Fernández (born October 14, 1968, in Bogotá) is a Colombian journalist and news presenter. She worked as a model in her teens to afford her studies in Social Communication at the Pontificia Universidad Javeriana. As news presenter, she worked in TV shows like Panorama, QAP Noticias and 7:30 Caracol. Since 1998, she's one of the main newsreaders at Caracol Noticias. She also worked at Caracol Radio until 2004.
