= Manuel Teodoro =

American journalist

- Born: Manuel Teodoro Bermúdez; April 12, 1960 (age 66); New Orleans, Louisiana, US
- Education: University of Miami
- Occupation: Television journalist
- Notable credit: Séptimo día
- Spouse: Ani Zamorano (1994-present)

Manuel Teodoro Bermúdez is an American journalist.

He was born in 1960 in New Orleans. His father is a Filipino and his mother was born in Cartagena de Indias. Teodoro majored in journalism from the University of Miami and started his career in 1984 as an editorial assistant for CBS News. Later he moved to Univision as a reporter and producer and became their correspondent in the Philippines. While staying in that country, he also anchored the evening news program "Newswatch" of the RPN television network.

After that he became the Hispanic New York based-correspondent for CNN. In 1994 he went to Colombia as correspondent for CNN and presenter of Noticiero CM&. Two years later he moved to Caracol TV, where he directed and hosted the 60 Minutes-like Séptimo día ("Seventh day") newsmagazine, which, despite its success, was cancelled in 2000 because of the large number of lawsuits against the show, all of them eventually won by Caracol TV. He then returned to CM&.

In 2007 Teodoro moved back for Caracol TV to direct and co-host, with Silvia Corzo, a new season of Séptimo día, which premiered 10 June 2007.
