= Noticias Caracol =

- Noticias Caracol current logo
- Directed by: Juan Roberto Vargas
- Presented by: María Lucía Fernández, et al.
- Country of origin: Colombia
- Original language: Spanish

Production
- Running time: weekdays 05:30: 180 minutes weekdays 12:30: 180 minutes weekdays 19:00: 60 minutes weekdays 23:30: 30 minutes Saturdays 12:30: 105 minutes Saturdays 19:00: 60 minutes Sundays 12:30: 90 minutes Sundays 19:00: 60 minutes

Original release
- Network: Caracol TV
- Release: July 10, 1998 – present

Noticias Caracol (until 9 October 2007 Caracol Noticias) is the name for all the national newscast from the news division of Caracol Televisión which carries the same name. It is broadcast four times on weekdays and twice on weekends. In January 2015 the new director is Juan Roberto Vargas and the second director is Alberto Medina Lopez.

Before becoming a network, Caracol Televisión produced the morning newscast 7:30 Caracol in the mid-1990s. Several well-known Colombian journalists, such as Claudia Palacios, Érika Fontalvo, and María Cristina Uribe were also news presenters of Caracol Noticias. Yamid Amat was its director until March 2002.

The newsroom and studio was built in nine months before Caracol Noticias' first airing, on 10 July 1998. Canadian company Imageneering acted as a consultant.

All Noticias Caracol newscasts are also aired live on Caracol TV Internacional.

It is currently the most watched newscast in Colombia.

== Sections ==
Noticias Caracol newscasts are divided in sections, grouped in three blocks: "serious" news (regional, national, world news, weather, health), sports, and entertainment. For the world news, Noticias Caracol has signed some agreements with services such as APTN, Reuters, Telemundo, and CNN en Español.

Noticias Caracol is also part of the Alianza Informativa Latinoamericana (AIL), with ATV (Peru), Ecuavisa (Ecuador), SNT Cerro Corá (Paraguay), Monte Carlo TV (Uruguay), Telefé (Argentina), Megavisión (Chile), Venevision (Venezuela), TV Azteca (Mexico), Unitel (Bolivia), TVN/TVMax (Panama), Teletica (Costa Rica), RedeTV! and Band News (Brazil), TV Doce (El Salvador), TV Azteca (Guatemala), WAPA WAPA AMERICA (Puerto Rico), Antena Latina/Noticias SIN (República Dominicana) and ATV CANAL 15 (Aruba). This alliance allows Noticias Caracol to use the services of journalists working for the member networks as foreign correspondents in their respective countries, also the AIL allows Noticias Caracol to use all the technical resources of the other networks to provide a better and faster response to the news events. The AIL also has built its own news agency, where all the networks provide the most important news events in their own countries and feed them to Caracol TV, where they are edited and rebroadcast by satellite to all the members of this alliance. Since September 2012, Caracol Television has become an ENEX (European News Exchange) an alliance that started in Europe 20 years ago, which has more than 42 television stations (Europe, Asia and Americas). Some of the stories are available at its website as video on demand, as well as at El Espectador's website. Both media outlets are owned by Julio Mario Santo Domingo.

=== Weekdays ===
The 5:30 a.m. newscast, presented by Catalina Gomez Sanchez and Juan Diego Alvira, focuses on national news—most of them from the day before—, sports, regional news, world news, and entertainment. On this newscast, guests are invited to the set to be interviewed by the presenters. It includes a weather forecast, supported by IDEAM, Colombia's meteorological institute, and a section named ¿Qué pasó con?, where viewers can learn what happened with an old story previously covered on the newscast. The newscast currently airs from 5:30-8:30 a.m.

The 12:30 midday newscast, presented by Mónica Jaramillo, Vanessa de la Torre and Mábel Lara, lasts one hour, but until early 2011, when a new season of El precio es correcto premiered, was the longest of all (it ended around 15:00). The newscast includes national, world and sports news, as well as a health section, in charge by doctor Fernanda Hernández, Con-sumo cuidado (a section on rights of the consumers), Ojo ciudadano (a section with denounces submitted by viewers), and Caracol más cerca, where a journalist travels around the country in order to show its diversity. The entertainment block is known as Del otro mundo. It airs from 12:30-3:15 p.m.

The 7:00 p.m. newscast is Noticias Caracol flagship news show, presented by Jorge Alfredo Vargas and María Lucía Fernández, where the main events, stories and developments of the day are summarized. It has no health section but it does include a Caracol más cerca abridged section, and Código Caracol, hosted by Mábel Lara, where some political events and gossip are revealed. It airs from 7:00-8:00 p.m.

The 11:30 p.m. newscast lasts 30 minutes and is presented by Alejandra Giraldo or Jennifer Montoya. It includes a culture section called Sala múltiple presented by Lina María Arbeláez, instead the entertainment block, and a review of El Espectador's main headlines for the next day. Its broadcasting time had been progressively moved from 21:30 to 22:00, 22:30, 23:00, 23:45, and midnight. It returned to the 22:00 time slot in January 2008 but it was moved half-hour later since 23 June 2008, and again in 2011 to 22:45. Currently, it airs as Ultima Edicion from 11:30 p.m.-12:00 a.m.

=== Weekends ===
The Noticias Caracol 12:30 midday and 7:00 p.m. newscasts on weekends are presented By Alejandra Giraldo and Jennifer Montoya. The 12:30 newscast was revamped since 18 April 2009, including, besides the news, specialized sections in law (En todo su derecho, by Silvia Corzo and later by Paola Bermúdez), technology (Click, by Juan Ignacio Velásquez), cinema (by Germán Espinel), cooking (2 x 3, by Pilar Schmitt), health (by Fernanda Hernández), music (by Adriana Tono), and culture (a weekend edition of Sala múltiple, by Lina María Arbeláez). The midday newscast currently airs from 12:30-2:00 p.m.

The 7:00 p.m. newscast tends to follow the three-block rule more conventionally. It includes a brief segment reviewing the main headlines for the following day’s edition of the El Espectador newspaper. Just like weeknights, it also airs from 7:00-8:00 p.m.

== On-air staff ==
=== Current anchors ===
- Andrés Montoya – First edition general co-anchor (2022-present)
- Daniela Pachón – First edition general co-anchor (2017-present)
- Ana Milena Gutiérrez – Weekmidday edition general co-anchor (2017-present)
- Catalina Gómez – Weekmidday edition general co-anchor (2013-present)
- María Lucía Fernández – Weeknight edition general co-anchor (1995–present)
- Alejandra Murgas – Weekend edition general co-anchor (2018-present)
- Catalina Vargas – Weekend edition general co-anchor (2022-present)
- Carolina Bejarano – First edition international anchor (2020-present)
- Margarita Rojas – Weekmidday edition international anchor (2009-present)
- Andreina Solorzano – Weeknight edition international anchor and Last edition anchor (2017-present)
- Marina Granziera – First edition sports anchor (2010-present)
- Javier Hernández Bonnet – Weeknight edition sports anchor (1998–present)
- Luis Felipe Jaramillo – Last edition sports anchor (2025-present)
- Juan Pablo Hernández – Weekend edition sports anchor (2011-present)
- Pilar Schmitt – First edition show caracol anchor (2009-present)
- Claudia Lozano – Weekmidday edition show caracol anchor (2007-present)
- Linda Palma – Weeknight edition show caracol anchor (2016-present)
- Valentina Espinosa – Weekend edition show caracol anchor (2025-present)

=== Regional center current anchors ===
- Stephany Perlaza – Valley regional center anchor (2020-present)
- Tatiana Vásquez – Antioquia regional center anchor (2023-present)
- Lucía Fernanda Yánez – Caribbean regional center anchor (2022-present)

=== Previous anchors ===
- Mábel Lara — First edition general co-anchor (2008–2017)
- Mónica Jaramillo — First edition general co-anchor (2013-2020)
- Juan Diego Alvira — First edition general co-anchor (2011-2022)
- Inés María Zabaraín — Weekmidday edition general co-anchor (1999–2011)
- Vanessa de la Torre — Weekmidday edition general co-anchor (2011-2020)
- Juanita Gómez — Weekmidday edition general co-anchor (2017–2021)
- Claudia Palacios — Weeknight edition general co-anchor (1998–2004)
- María Cristina Uribe – Weeknight edition general co-anchor (1998–2001)
- Isaac Nessim – Weeknight edition general co-anchor (1998–2006)
- Silvia Corzo — Weekend edition general co-anchor (2002–2011)
- Jennifer Montoya — Weekend edition general co-anchor and Last edition anchor (2015–2017)
- Dora Glottman – Weekmidday edition international anchor (2008-2019)
- Diva Jessurum – First edition show caracol anchor (2013-2018)
- Siad Char – Weekmidday edition show caracol anchor (2009-2015)
- Daniela Vega – Weekmidday edition show caracol anchor (2015-2018)
- Viviana Dávila – Weekmidday edition show caracol anchor and Weekend edition international anchor (2015-2019)
- María McCausland – Weeknight edition show caracol anchor (2018-2022)
- Alejandra Isaza – Weekend edition show caracol anchor (2017)
- Daniela Castelblanco – Weekend edition show caracol anchor (2021-2024)
- Jorge Alfredo Vargas – Weeknight edition general co-anchor (2006–2026)
- Ricardo Orrego – Weekmidday edition sports anchor (2000-2026)

=== Previous regional center anchors ===
- Mábel Lara — Valley regional center anchor (2008–2017)
- Ana Milena Gutiérrez – Valley regional center anchor (2017-2020)
- Andrés Montoya – Antioquia regional center anchor (2022-2024)
- Alejandra Murgas – Caribbean regional center anchor (2018-2022)

== Alianza Informativa Latinoamericana ==
- Argentina: CN23 and Telefe
- Bolivia: Unitel
- Brazil: Band
- Chile: Mega
- Costa Rica: Teletica
- Dominican Republic: Noticias SIN - Color Visión
- Ecuador: Ecuavisa
- El Salvador: Teledos (Canal 2), Noticias 4 Visión (Canal 4), El Noticiero (Canal 6) and TCS Noticias
- Guatemala: Azteca Guatemala
- Honduras: Canal 11
- Mexico: TV Azteca and ADN40
- Nicaragua: Canal 10
- Panama: TVN
- Paraguay: Telefuturo
- Peru: Latina Televisión
- Puerto Rico: WAPA-TV
- Uruguay: Monte Carlo TV
- Venezuela: Venevisión
- United States: CBS News
- Aruba: Telearuba
- Curaçao: TeleCuraçao

== See also ==
- Caracol TV
- Television in Colombia
