= Blu Radio =

Colombian radio station

Coordinates: 4°41′38″N 74°4′27″W

Blu Radio Bogotá (HJCK)
- Bogotá; Colombia
- Frequency: 89.9 MHz

Programming
- Format: News, talk, sports, soft AC
- Affiliations: El Espectador

Ownership
- Owner: Caracol TV

History
- First air date: July 2012 (test broadcasts); 6 September 2012; 13 years ago
- Former call signs: HJMD (2012–2016)
- Former frequencies: 96.9 MHz (2012–2016)

Links
- Website: bluradio.com

Blu Radio is a radio station in Bogotá, Colombia, owned by Caracol TV.

In July 2012, Caracol TV leased HJMD (the frequency of Melodía FM Estéreo, an easy listening station) from Cadena Melodía, in order to create a news radio station. Test broadcasts started soon after, with a soft AC format and simulcasting Noticias Caracol.

Blu Radio started definitive broadcasts 6 September 2012. The news director is Noticias Caracol presenter Juan Roberto Vargas, and the morning news programme is presented by Néstor Morales, former Caracol Radio personality.

Since late 2016, Blu Radio Bogotá broadcasts at 89.9 MHz after Caracol TV purchased Radial Bogotá, the owner of HJCK, a classical music and cultural radio station whose frequency were leased by Caracol Radio in 2005. HJMD 96.9 MHz switched to a popular music format (rancheras, tex-mex, etc.) called La Kalle.

Its main competitors are La FM, Caracol Radio.

== Programming ==
Blu Radio's schedule is similar to other FM talk stations in Bogotá, mainly W Radio and Caracol Radio: on weekdays, a news/debate morning show, a local programme on midday, variety and sports (mainly football) on the afternoons, and a simulcast of Noticias Caracol and a programme devoted to technology and internet on the evenings. Weekends include a morning show, sports programming (again, mainly football), and music.

== Affiliates ==
Blu Radio's owners intend to build a national radio network, whose flagship will be Bogotá's HJCK.

These stations rebroadcast at least part of the Blu Radio programming:

- Cali: HJSU 91.5 MHz
- Neiva/Algeciras: HJM47 103.1 MHz
- Villavicencio/San Martín: HJN42 96.3 MHz
- Medellín/Bello: HJD78 97.9 MHz
- Barranquilla: HJH27 100.1 MHz
- Eje cafetero (Pereira, Armenia)/La Unión: HJQ56 89.2 MHz
- Tunja/Paipa (also serving Duitama): HJH87 103.1 MHz
- Cúcuta/El Zulia: HJO42 99.7 MHz
- Montería/Sahagún: HJL37 96 MHz
- Bucaramanga: HJMH 1080 kHz

(When mentioned, the second city listed is the actual city of licence).
