= MGM Channel =

MGM Channel can refer to:

- MGM Networks
- MGM (TV channel)
  - MGM Channel (Canada)
  - MGM Channel (European TV channel)
  - Canal MGM Spain
- MGM HD

== See also ==
- MGM/UA (disambiguation)
- MGM (disambiguation)
