= Fran Mires =

American television executive

Fran Mires is a television producer credited with the creation and launch of dozens of television shows in English, Spanish and now Arabic. She is a graduate of San Francisco State University and earned her master's degree in journalism from the Medill School of Journalism at Northwestern University. She is married with three children.

A native of San Francisco and based in Florida, Mires is credited with the launch of Spanish language network Telemundo's highly rated, flagship news magazine Ocurrió Así in 1990, hosted by Enrique Gratas and later by Pedro Sevcec. The show, the first of its kind in the Spanish language national and International markets, was on the air for 11 years. Other shows by Mires during her tenure at Telemundo: La Buena Vida (The Good Life) hosted by former Miss Universe Cecilia Bolocco and Primera Hora.

Mires has conceived and launched dozens of shows in multiple formats for clients like NBC Daytime, MGM Networks Latin America, HGTV, United Family Communications, and Hearst-Argyle.

As a consultant, Mires was hired to help launch "C News" which is part of C Television in Trinidad and on March 8, 2009, launched Al Youm, a 3-hour, Sunday through Thursday, prime time news magazine in Arabic. The show which airs throughout the Middle East and Europe is the first of its kind in the region. It broadcasts live from 3 continents from 5 studios in Dubai, Beirut, Jerusalem, Cairo & Virginia.

Some of Fran Mires' shows:

News

- Al Youm, Alhurra Television (2009) Launch, Creator, Executive Producer
- C News, C Television (2006) Launch News Consultant
- Telenoticias del Mundo, (1995) Launch, Director of Programming
- Real Life, NBC Daytime & Sunbeam Productions (1996) Launch, Co-Executive Producer
- Ocurrio asi, Telemundo Network (1990-2001) Launch, Creator, Executive Producer
- Ocurrio asi de noche Telemundo Network (1993) Launch, Creator, Executive Producer
- Primera Hora del Medio Dia, Telemundo Network(1994) Launch, Creator, Executive Producer
- Primera Hora, Telemundo Network (1993) Launch, Creator, Executive Producer
- Alta Tension Telemundo Network(1993) Launch, Creator, Executive Producer
- La Buena Vida, Telemundo Network (1991) Launch, Creator, Executive Producer
- The Rick Sanchez Show, NBC Miami Launch, Executive Producer
- Question Time, BBC World (2004) US Election Coverage Special, US Live Producer
- Inside Report, WSVN Segment Producer

Variety

- My Games Fever My Games Fever, Shine Limited (2006) Launch, Producer
- Nuevas Voces de America, Telemundo Network & Estefan Enterprises (2005) Launch, Show Producer
- 21 Days, Animus Entertainment Group (Pilot) Producer
- Sabor Miami con el Chef Pepin, MGM Networks Latin America (1998) Launch, Executive Producer
- En Casa de Lucy, MGM Networks Latin America (1998) Launch, Executive Producer
- Generation Cosmo, Hearst Argyle (Pilot) Launch, Executive Producer
- Cafe Cosmopolitan, Hearst Argyle (Pilot) Launch, Executive Producer
- A Las Brasas, con el Chef Carlos Yanes, MGM Networks Latin America (1998) Launch, Creator, Executive Producer
- Vivir con Estilo MGM Networks Latin America(1998) Launch, Creator, Executive Producer
- Detalles Con Fredo Valladares, MGM Networks Latin America(1998) Launch, Creator, Executive Producer
- Primeros Pasos, MGM Networks Latin America (1998) Launch, Creator, Executive Producer
- Crecer con la Dra. Marisa Azaret, MGM Networks Latin America (1998) Launch, Creator, Executive Producer
- Casa Club Magazine, MGM Networks Latin America (1997-1998) Launch, Creator, Executive Producer
- Home on the Waves, HGTV (1998) Creator, Producer
