= Television producer =

Person who oversees aspects of video production on a television program

A television producer is a person who oversees one or more aspects of a television program. Some producers take more of an executive role, in that they conceive new programs and pitch them to the television networks, but upon acceptance they focus on business matters, such as budgets and contracts. Other producers are more involved with the day-to-day workings, participating in activities such as screenwriting, set design, casting, and directing.

There may be a variety of different producers on a television show, including showrunners, executive producers, supervising producers, coordinating producers, field producers, line producers, among other roles on a television crew.

== Notable television producers ==
- J. J. Abrams: Alias, Lost, Fringe, Person of Interest
- Mara Brock Akil: The Game, Girlfriends
- David Angell: Frasier, Wings, Cheers
- Desi Arnaz: I Love Lucy (1952–1956), Those Whiting Girls, The Lucy-Desi Comedy Hour (1957–1960), The Fountain of Youth, The Texan, The Ann Sothern Show (1958–1961), New Comedy Showcase, The Untouchables (1961–1962), The Lucy Show (1962–1963), The Mothers-In-Law (1967–1969), Land's End
- Nick Bakay: Sabrina the Teenage Witch, The King of Queens, 'Til Death, Two and a Half Men, Mom, The Kominsky Method
- Alan Ball: Six Feet Under, True Blood
- Chuck Barris: The Dating Game, The Gong Show, The Newlywed Game, Treasure Hunt
- Biddy Baxter: Blue Peter (1962–65; editor 1965–1988)
- Thom Beers: Deadliest Catch, Lobster Wars, numerous other Discovery Channel series
- Bradley Bell: The Bold and the Beautiful (1995–present)
- William J. Bell: The Young and the Restless (1973–2005), The Bold and the Beautiful (1987–1995)
- Donald P. Bellisario: Magnum, P.I., Airwolf, JAG, NCIS, Quantum Leap
- David Benioff: Game of Thrones
- Rick Berman: Star Trek: The Next Generation, Star Trek: Deep Space Nine, Star Trek: Voyager, Star Trek: Enterprise
- Eric Bischoff: WCW Monday Nitro
- Linda Bloodworth-Thomason: Designing Women, Evening Shade, Hearts Afire
- Andy Bobrow: Community, Malcolm in the Middle
- Steven Bochco: Hill Street Blues, L.A. Law, NYPD Blue
- Yvette Lee Bowser: Living Single, For Your Love, Half & Half
- Kevin S. Bright: Friends, Veronica's Closet, Jesse, Joey
- James L. Brooks: The Mary Tyler Moore Show, Rhoda, Taxi, The Simpsons, The Tracey Ullman Show, Lou Grant
- Jerry Bruckheimer: The Amazing Race, Cold Case, CSI: Crime Scene Investigation, CSI: Cyber, CSI: Miami, CSI: NY, Without a Trace
- Mark Burnett: The Apprentice, Survivor, Rock Star, Are You Smarter than a 5th Grader?, The Contender, The Voice, Beat Shazam, The World's Best
- Stephen J. Cannell: The Rockford Files, The Greatest American Hero, 21 Jump Street, The A-Team, Hardcastle and McCormick, Hunter, Riptide, Stingray, Wiseguy, Renegade, Silk Stalkings, The Commish
- Marcy Carsey: 3rd Rock from the Sun, A Different World, The Cosby Show, Cosby, Roseanne, Cybill
- Chris Carter: The X-Files, Millennium, Harsh Realm, The Lone Gunmen
- Shaun Cassidy: American Gothic, Invasion, Ruby & The Rockits
- Ilene Chaiken: The L Word
- David Chase: The Sopranos
- Marc Cherry: Desperate Housewives, The Golden Girls
- Stephen Colbert: Strangers with Candy, The Colbert Report
- Betty Corday: Days of Our Lives (1966–1987)
- Ken Corday: Days of Our Lives (1985–present)
- Ted Corday: Days of Our Lives (1965–1966)
- David Cormican: Between, Shadowhunters, The Secret Life of Marilyn Monroe
- Simon Cowell: The X Factor, Britain's Got Talent, America's Got Talent
- Ron Cowen: Queer as Folk USA
- David Crane: Dream On, Friends, Veronica's Closet, Jesse, The Class, Episodes
- Carlton Cuse: The Adventures of Brisco County, Jr., Nash Bridges, Lost, Bates Motel, The Strain
- Greg Daniels: The Office, King of the Hill, The Simpsons
- Mike Darnell: 500 Questions, The World's Best, Mental Samurai
- Larry David: Seinfeld, Curb Your Enthusiasm
- Michael Davies: Who Wants to Be a Millionaire (1999–2010)
- Russell T Davies: Queer as Folk UK, Doctor Who (2005–2010; 2023–2025), Torchwood and The Sarah Jane Adventures
- Frederick de Cordova: The Tonight Show Starring Johnny Carson (1970–1992)
- John de Mol: Big Brother, Fear Factor, Deal or No Deal
- Suzanne de Passe: Lonesome Dove, Sister, Sister, Smart Guy
- Roger Dobkowitz: The Price Is Right (1984–2008)
- David Doyle: Poker Superstars Invitational Tournament, Puppy Bowl
- Tina Fey: 30 Rock, Unbreakable Kimmy Schmidt
- Jeff Franklin: Full House, Hangin' with Mr. Cooper
- Lowell Ganz: Happy Days, Laverne & Shirley, Joanie Loves Chachi
- Larry Gelbart: M*A*S*H, AfterMASH
- Michael Gill: Civilisation, Alistair Cooke's America
- Vince Gilligan: Breaking Bad, Better Call Saul
- Mark Goodson: Beat the Clock, Card Sharks, Classic Concentration, Family Feud, I've Got a Secret, Match Game, Password, The Price Is Right, Tattletales, To Tell the Truth, What's My Line?
- Lauren Graham: Gilmore Girls
- Brad Grey: It's Garry Shandling's Show, The Larry Sanders Show, The Sopranos
- Merv Griffin: Jeopardy!, Wheel of Fortune
- Paul Haggis: Due South
- Alan Hardwick: Yorkshire Television
- Dan Harmon: Community
- Don Hewitt: 60 Minutes
- Stephen Hillenburg: SpongeBob SquarePants
- Roy Huggins: Baretta, The Fugitive, The Rockford Files
- Armando Giovanni Iannucci, OBE: The Thick of It, Veep
- Marta Kauffman: Dream On, Friends, Veronica's Closet, Jesse, Related, Grace and Frankie
- David E. Kelley: Ally McBeal, Boston Legal, Boston Public, Chicago Hope, Picket Fences, The Practice
- Michael Patrick King: Sex and the City
- Eric Kripke: Supernatural, Revolution
- Matt Kunitz: Fear Factor, Wipeout
- Verity Lambert: Doctor Who (1963–1965), Adam Adamant Lives!, Jonathan Creek
- John Langley: COPS
- Peter Lassally: The Tonight Show Starring Johnny Carson, Late Night with David Letterman, Late Show with David Letterman, The Late Late Show with Craig Ferguson
- Lynn Marie Latham: Knots Landing, Homefront, The Young and the Restless
- Bill Lawrence: Scrubs, Cougar Town, Spin City
- Norman Lear: All in the Family, Good Times, Maude, One Day at a Time, Sanford and Son
- Ron Leavitt: Married... with Children, Unhappily Ever After
- Damon Lindelof: Lost, The Leftovers, Watchmen
- Daniel Lipman: Queer as Folk (US)
- Chuck Lorre: Grace Under Fire, Cybill, Dharma & Greg, Two and a Half Men, The Big Bang Theory, Mike & Molly, Mom
- Seth MacFarlane: Family Guy, American Dad!, The Cleveland Show
- David Maloney: Blake's 7, The Day of the Triffids
- Garry Marshall: The Odd Couple (1970–1975), Happy Days (1974–1984), Laverne & Shirley (1976–1983)
- Quinn Martin: The Untouchables, The Fugitive, The F.B.I., The Invaders, Cannon, The Streets of San Francisco, Barnaby Jones
- Elizabeth Meriwether: New Girl
- Lorne Michaels: Saturday Night Live, The Kids in the Hall, 30 Rock
- Fran Mires: Ocurrio asi, Al Youm
- Steven Moffat: Doctor Who (2010–2017; 2024), Sherlock, Jekyll, Coupling, Joking Apart and Chalk
- Ronald D. Moore: Battlestar Galactica, Roswell, Star Trek: Deep Space Nine, Star Trek: The Next Generation
- Sarah Mulvey: Brat Camp, 10 Years Younger, Wife Swap
- Ryan Murphy: Popular, Nip/Tuck, Glee, American Horror Story, American Horror Stories, The New Normal
- John Nathan-Turner: Doctor Who (1980–1989)
- Mic Neumann: Kung Faux
- Sydney Newman: General Motors Theatre, Armchair Theatre
- Jonathan Nolan: Person of Interest
- Rockne S. O'Bannon: Farscape, Cult
- Michelle Paradise: Exes and Ohs
- Tyler Perry: Meet the Browns, Tyler Perry's House of Payne, For Better or Worse
- William P. Perry: Anyone for Tennyson?
- Julie Plec: The Vampire Diaries
- Bill Podmore: Coronation Street
- Gordon Ramsay: MasterChef US, Kitchen Nightmares, Ramsay's Best Restaurant
- Paul Rauch: Another World (1971–1983), Texas (1980–1981), One Life to Live (1984–1991), Santa Barbara (1992–1993), Guiding Light (1996–2002), The Young and the Restless (2008–2011)
- Shonda Rhimes: Grey's Anatomy, Private Practice, Scandal, How to Get Away with Murder
- Mark Risley: Rugrats, The Wild Thornberrys, Rocket Power and As Told by Ginger
- Gene Roddenberry: Star Trek: The Original Series, Star Trek: The Next Generation
- Shawn Ryan: The Shield, The Chicago Code, Last Resort
- Haim Saban: Power Rangers (1993–2001; 2010–present), Beetleborgs, VR Troopers
- Magnús Scheving: LazyTown
- Dan Schneider: Victorious, iCarly, Drake & Josh, Zoey 101, What I Like About You, Kenan & Kel, The Amanda Show, All That, Cousin Skeeter, Sam & Cat, Henry Danger, Game Shakers, The Adventures of Kid Danger
- Josh Schwartz: The O.C., Chuck, Gossip Girl
- Fred Seibert: Adventure Time, The Fairly OddParents. Dexter's Laboratory
- Jerry Seinfeld: Seinfeld
- Tom Selleck: Magnum, P.I.
- Garry Shandling: It's Garry Shandling's Show, The Larry Sanders Show
- David Shore: House, Battle Creek
- David Simon: The Wire, The Corner, Generation Kill, Homicide: Life on the Street, Treme
- Arthur Smith: Hell's Kitchen, American Ninja Warrior, The Titan Games, Mental Samurai
- Aaron Sorkin: Sports Night, The West Wing, Studio 60 on the Sunset Strip, The Newsroom
- Aaron Spelling: Beverly Hills, 90210, Charmed, Charlie's Angels, The Colbys, Dynasty, Family, Fantasy Island, Glitter, Hart to Hart, Hotel, The Love Boat, Love Boat: The Next Wave, Matt Houston, Melrose Place, The Mod Squad, 7th Heaven, Starsky & Hutch, Strike Force, Summerland, Sunset Beach, S.W.A.T., T. J. Hooker, Titans, Vega$
- Darren Star: Beverly Hills, 90210, Melrose Place, Sex and the City
- Stephen Stohn: Degrassi: The Next Generation, Instant Star
- J. Michael Straczynski: Babylon 5
- Adam Tandy: The Thick of It, Inside No. 9, Detectorists
- Tim Taylor: 13 series of Time Team
- Harry Thomason: Designing Women, Evening Shade, Hearts Afire
- Paul Tibbitt: SpongeBob SquarePants (2007–present)
- Bill Todman: Beat the Clock, Card Sharks, Family Feud, I've Got a Secret, Match Game, Password, The Price Is Right, Tattletales, To Tell the Truth, What's My Line?
- Ivan Tors: Science Fiction Theater, Sea Hunt, The Man and the Challenge, The Aquanauts, Daring Game, Flipper, Gentle Ben, Daktari, Rip Cord, Cowboy in Africa, Jambo
- Mark Wahlberg: In Treatment, Entourage, Boardwalk Empire
- Ray Waru: Frontier of Dreams
- Ken Warwick: American Idol, America's Got Talent, Pop Idol, Gladiators
- Reg Watson: The Young Doctors, Prisoner, Neighbours
- Michael Wearing: Boys from the Blackstuff, Edge of Darkness
- Matthew Weiner: Mad Men
- D. B. Weiss: Game of Thrones
- Joss Whedon: Buffy the Vampire Slayer, Angel, Firefly and Dollhouse
- Kevin Williamson: The Vampire Diaries, The Following, Dawson's Creek
- Andy Wilman: Top Gear and The Grand Tour
- Terence Winter: Boardwalk Empire
- Dick Wolf: Law & Order, Law & Order: Criminal Intent, Law & Order: Special Victims Unit, Law & Order: Trial by Jury, Law & Order: LA, Chicago P.D., Chicago Fire, Chicago Med, Chicago Justice, FBI, FBI: Most Wanted, FBI: International, On Call
- J. H. Wyman: Fringe, Almost Human, Keen Eddie

== See also ==
- Film producer
- Producers Guild of America
- Writers Guild of America
- Screenwriter
