= Intissar =

Intissar, Intisar, Intiser or Entissar (Arabic: انتصار) is an Arabic unisex given name meaning victory or triumph. Notable people with the name include:

- Intissar Abdulmomen, Egyptian writer and novelist
- Intisar Abioto (born 1986), American artist and storyteller
- Intissar Amer (born 1956), First Lady of Egypt
- Intisar Abu Amara (born 1958), Palestinian politician
- Intisar el-Zein Soughayroun (1950), Sudanese archaeologist
- Intisar A. Rabb, American jurist
- Intisar Salem Al Ali Al Sabah (born 1964), Kuwaiti entrepreneur, philanthropist, author, and film producer
- Intisar Al-Sharrah (1962–2021), Kuwaiti actress
- Intissar al-Wazir (born 1941), member of the Palestinian Legislative Council
