= David Doyle (disambiguation) =

David Doyle (1929–1997) was an American actor.

David Doyle may also refer to:

- David W. Doyle (1924–2014), American CIA officer and author
- David K. Doyle (1931–2021), United States Army general
- David J. Doyle, American politician in Michigan
- David Doyle (rower) (born 1961), Australian rower
- David Doyle (judge), Manx judge
- David Doyle (soccer) (born 1965), Irish/American soccer forward
- David Doyle (producer), American television producer
