= The British Empire (1972 TV programme) =

- Original language: English

Original release
- Release: 11 January – 4 April 1972

The British Empire, Echoes of Britannia’s Rule is a thirteen-part British documentary television series produced by the BBC and Time-Life Films first broadcast in 1972. It was preceded by Kenneth Clark’s Civilisation in 1969, and followed by Alistair Cooke’s America: A Personal History of the United States in the same year, and Jacob Bronowski’s The Ascent of Man in 1973. It cost £500,000 to produce and was narrated by Robert Hardy.

At the time, it provoked a debate in the House of Lords for its apparent bias against the Empire.

== Episodes ==
No.	Title	Original release date
1	"Oh! the Jubilee!"	11 January 1972
The first episode opens with the celebrations marking Queen Victoria's Diamond Jubilee on 22 June 1897, using the event to illustrate the British Empire at its greatest territorial extent.
2	"The sugar slaves"	18 January 1972
3	"Remember Cawnpore"	25 January 1972
4	"All Frontier and Nothing Else"	1 February 1972
5	"In Darkest Africa"	8 February 1972
6	"Raj"	15 February 1972
7	"Scramble for Africa"	22 February 1972
8	"The Challenge"	29 February 1972
9	"Beyond the Black Stump"	7 March 1972
10	"New Gods for Old"	14 March 1972
11	"The Gift of Endless Dreams"	21 March 1972
12	"The Long Farewell"	28 March 1972
13	"The Setting of the Sun"	4 April 1972
