= MGM (disambiguation) =

MGM is Metro-Goldwyn-Mayer, an American media and film company.

MGM may also refer to:

== Arts, entertainment, and media ==
- Amazon MGM Studios
- MGM (TV channel)
- MGM Distribution, a record label
- MGM Records, a record label
- Sony Pictures Studios, former MGM studio, Culver City, California, US
- Militärgeschichtliche Mitteilungen, a German magazine of military history

== Brands and enterprises ==
- Disney-MGM Studios, former name of the theme park Disney's Hollywood Studios at Walt Disney World Resort, US
- MGM Energy a Canadian petroleum company
- MGM Group of Companies (M. G. Muthu Group), Chennai, India
  - MGM Dizzee World, a theme park in Chennai, South India
- MGM Resorts International, a Las Vegas, Nevada-based US owner of casinos and hotels
  - MGM Macau
  - MGM Grand, multiple properties
  - MGM Mirage Aviation
  - MGM National Harbor, Oxon Hill, Maryland
  - MGM Northfield Park, Northfield, Ohio
  - MGM Springfield, Springfield, Massachusetts
  - Park MGM, Las Vegas, Nevada

== Transportation ==
- Metheringham railway station, England, station code
- Montgomery Regional Airport, Alabama, US, airport code

== Other uses ==
- Mid Glamorgan, preserved county in Wales, Chapman code
- Mobile surface-attack guided missile, a US military missile designation
- Male genital mutilation

== See also ==
- MGM/UA
