= Intisar A. Rabb =

American legal scholar and professor

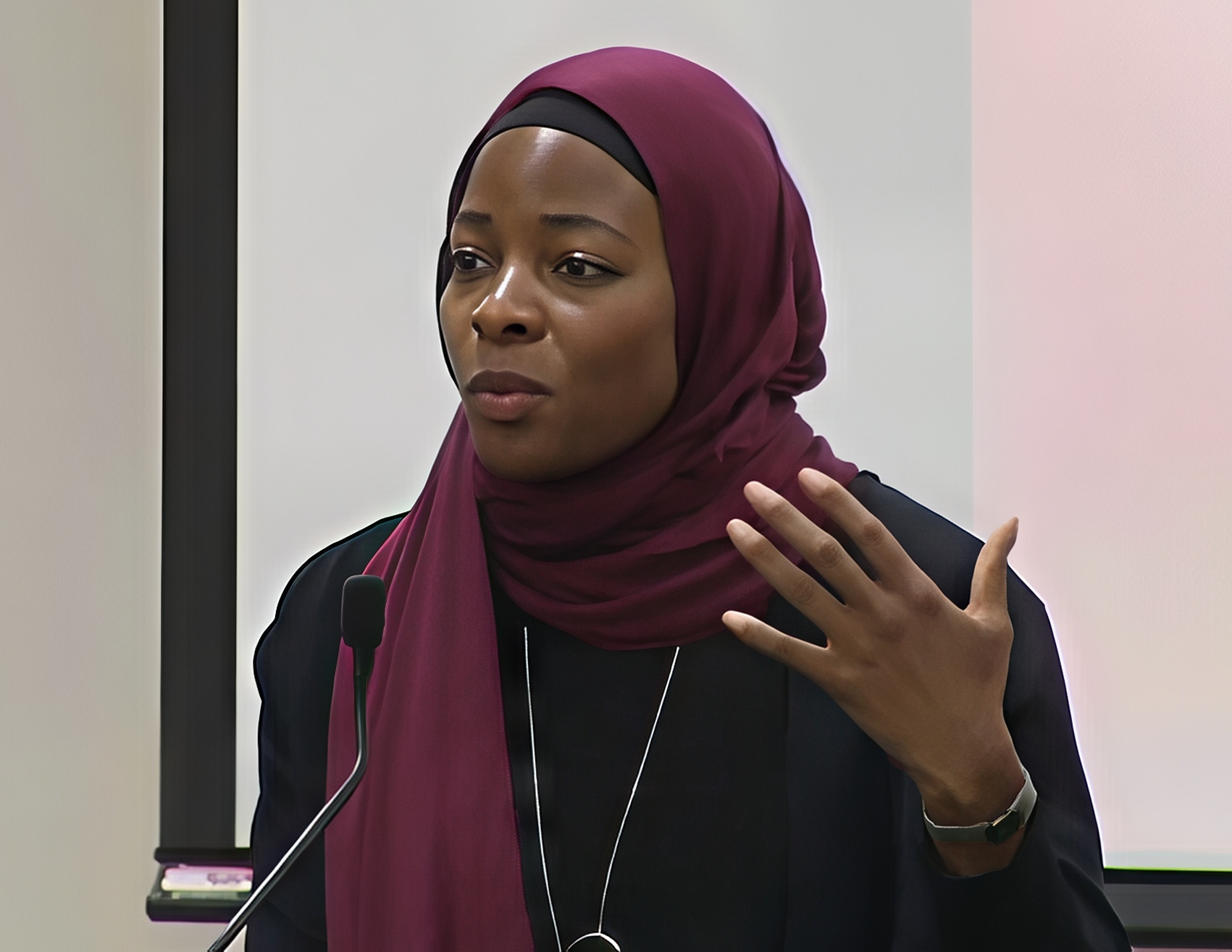
- Rabb speaking in 2016
- Born: Baltimore, Maryland, United States
- Occupation: Jurist

Academic background
- Education: Princeton University
- Thesis: Doubt's Benefit: Legal Maxims in Islamic Law, 7th–16th Centuries (2009)
- Doctoral advisor: Hossein Modarressi

Intisar A. Rabb is an American legal scholar and professor at the Harvard Law School in Cambridge, Massachusetts, United States. Born in Baltimore, Rabb developed an early interest in academia and completed studies at Georgetown and Princeton before earning her Juris Doctor degree at Yale Law School in 2006 and her doctorate at Princeton in 2009. After short stints at Boston College Law School and New York University, in 2014 she was made a professor at Harvard Law School. With Harvard, she has published a book on the legal concept of doubt in Muslim majority countries and developed an online portal providing access to primary and secondary sources on Sharia (Islamic law).

== Biography ==
=== Early life ===
Rabb was born in Baltimore, Maryland, one of seven siblings. Her parents were African-American Muslims who had studied under the Nation of Islam and Warith Deen Mohammed. They gave Rabb the Arabic name Intisar, which translates variously to "victory" or "triumph".

Rabb's first years were spent in Baltimore's Park Heights neighborhood. After her parents' divorce, she spent time between Columbia, Maryland, and Washington, D.C.. She showed an early interest in academia, earning several college credits while still attending high school, with a particular interest in law that stemmed from her time living in Washington, D.C. She was also engaged in social organizations, such as the Muslim Youth of North America, and traveled to Damascus in Syria as part of a student group.

=== Tertiary studies ===
Rabb enrolled at Georgetown University, earning a dual degree in government and Arabic in 1999. In 2005, she completed her masters studies, with a focus on Near Eastern Studies, at Princeton University. Rabb received her Juris Doctor from Yale Law School in 2006. Between 2006 and 2007, Rabb worked as a law clerk for Thomas L. Ambro, a judge with the United States Court of Appeals for the Third Circuit. She later spent time in the United Kingdom as a Temple Bar Scholar.

Rabb passed the bar in New Jersey in 2007 and in New York in 2008. In 2009, she received a doctorate degree in Islamic Law from Princeton, writing her dissertation Doubt's Benefit: Legal Maxims in Islamic Law, 7th–16th Centuries under the supervision of Hossein Modarressi. In 2009, she was named a Carnegie Scholar, receiving support for Islamic Law and Legal Change: The Internal Critique; this comparative study was announced to include an overview of criminal law reform in 27 Muslim countries, as well as a comparative review of the Iranian and Saudi legal systems. The following year, her dissertation received the Bayard and Cleveland Dodge Memorial Prize from Princeton. She was hired by Boston College Law School in 2010 as an assistant professor, remaining there until 2012.

=== Academic career ===
Rabb began teaching at New York University in 2013, serving as an assistant professor at the school of law and the department of Middle eastern studies. She remained in this position until 2014, when she became a tenured professor at Harvard Law School in Cambridge, Massachusetts. Dean Martha Minow described her as "a first rate scholar", who "engages across historical and present-day legal issues and materials with nimbleness and contagious curiosity". She had previously been a visiting associate professor in 2012.

Rabb's first book, Doubt in Islamic Law: A History of Legal Maxims, Interpretations, and Criminal Law, was published in 2015. In it, she explored the concept of doubt in Islamic law, tracing it from the stoning of Ma'iz in the time of Muhammad through the early development of Islamic jurisprudence, the canonization of Sunni Islamic law under the Hanafi, Maliki, and Shafi'i schools in the tenth century, and into the sixteenth century. Reviewing in the Journal of Near Eastern Studies, Mohammad Fadel described the work as an "extremely ambitious ... must-read for anyone interested in Islamic legal history, Islamic criminal law, or comparative criminal law", though he regretted that the breadth of study left some important questions unanswered. In Islamic Law and Society, Ayman Shabana described Doubt in Islamic Law as an "insightful account of the evolution of Islamic criminal law" that challenges the perception of Islamic law as a monolithic entity.

In mid-2016, Rabb launched SHARIASource, an online portal allowing users to access sources on Sharia (Islamic law) through the internet. Inspired by the Westlaw legal research database and SCOTUSblog of the United States Supreme Court, the system was funded through grants from the MacArthur Foundation and the Henry Luce Foundation. Designed for academics, journalists, policymakers and scholars, SHARIASource offers access to primary and secondary sources on Islamic law in various languages. Works are crowdsourced from scholars active in the field, who also comment on each other's work. By 2022, the portal had been updated with machine learning and artificial intelligence elements.

By 2016, Rabb was the director of the Harvard Law School's Islamic Legal Studies program. In 2017, she was chosen as a fellow at the Harvard Radcliffe Institute for the period ending in 2018. She has served on the board of the Journal of Islamic Law and Society, as well as a guest editor of the Journal of Law and Religion. Outside of academia, Rabb served on the legal team that represented Cariol Horne in her efforts to recoup fifteen years of wages lost after Horne prevented another police officer from choking a suspect. In 2022, Rabb was named an advisor to Karim Ahmad Khan, the prosecutor of the International Criminal Court.

== Analysis ==
Rabb's studies focus on areas of comparative law, Islamic legal studies, criminal law and procedure, law and religion, and legal history. Reviewing the literature on Islamist groups in the United States, Tabinda Mahfooz Khan described Rabb as prominent in recent efforts to develop interdisciplinary approaches to Islamic legal studies in the country. She referred to Rabb's studies of Islamic constitutionalism as employing an approach that "meets the rigor of comparative politics yet avoids the pitfall of uncritically reproducing liberal paradigms as benchmarks".

== Selected publications ==
=== Books ===
- Doubt in Islamic Law: A History of Legal Maxims, Interpretations, and Criminal Law. Cambridge University Press. 2015. ISBN 978-1-107-08099-7.
- Justice and Leadership in Early Islamic Courts. Islamic Legal Studies Program, Harvard Law School. 2017. ISBN 978-0-674-98421-9. (edited with Abigail Krasner Balbale)

=== Journal articles ===
- "Non-Canonical Readings of the Qur'an: Recognition and Authenticity Persist? (The Himsī Reading)". Journal of Qur'anic Studies. 8 (2): 84–127. 2006. doi:10.3366/jqs.2006.8.2.84.
- "'We the Jurists': Islamic Constitutionalism in Iraq". Journal of Constitutional Law. 10: 527–579. 2008. SSRN 1263354. Archived from the original on October 7, 2014.
- "Islamic Legal Maxims as Substantive Canons of Construction: Hudūd-Avoidance in Cases of Doubt". Islamic Law and Society. 17: 63–125. 2010. doi:10.1163/092893809X12472107043920. SSRN 1634013.
- "Against Kadijustiz: On the Negative Citation of Foreign Law". Suffolk University Law Review. 48: 343–377. 2015. SSRN 2603715.
- "The Appellate Rule of Lenity". Harvard Law Review. 131 (8): 179–216. 2018.

== Works cited ==
- "2009 Carnegie Scholars Announced". Carnegie Foundation. 2009. Archived from the original on February 24, 2026.
- Abdul-Majid, Narjis Nichole (February 4, 2016). "Profile: Intisar A. Rabb". Sapelo Square. Archived from the original on February 24, 2026.
- Ali, Noor (September–October 2016). "Sharia Online". Islamic Horizons. 45 (5). Plainfield: 35 – via ProQuest.
- "Muslim American "Women's History Month" Salutes to Intisar A. Rabb, Amal Clooney and Others Assigned Advisers to the International Criminal Court". Muslim Journal. Chicago. March 12, 2022. pp. 3, 23. ProQuest 2645532129 – via ProQuest.
- Fadel, Mohammad (2016). "Reviewed work: Doubt in Islamic Law: A History of Legal Maxims, Interpretation, and Islamic Criminal Law, Rabb Intisar A". Journal of Near Eastern Studies. 75 (1): 198–201. doi:10.1086/684999. JSTOR 26557667.
- "Fellowships (6/23/2017)". The Chronicle of Higher Education. June 18, 2017. ProQuest 1924593412 – via ProQuest.
- Garlock, Stephanie (April 15, 2015). "Harvard Islamic Legal Studies Program Launches SHARIASource Digital Platform". Harvard Magazine. Archived from the original on February 24, 2026.
- "Intisar A. Rabb". Harvard Law School. Archived from the original on February 8, 2026.
- "Introducing Intisar Rabb". NYU Law Magazine. 2012. Archived from the original on February 24, 2026.
- Khan, Tabinda Mahfooz (2023). "Challenges with Studying Islamist Groups in American Political Science". American Journal of Islam and Society. 39 (3–4): 112–141. doi:10.35632/ajis.v39i3-4.3085. ProQuest 2786940613.
- Prince, Zenitha (October 11, 2013). "Baltimore-Born Woman Joins Harvard Law Faculty as Islamic Law Scholar". Middle East Forum. Archived from the original on February 24, 2026.
- Rabb, Intisar (2009). Doubt's Benefit: Legal Maxims in Islamic Law, 7th–16th Centuries (Thesis). Princeton University.
- Shabana, Ayman (2017). "Doubt in Islamic Law: A History of Legal Maxims, Interpretation, and Islamic Criminal Law, written by Intisar A. Rabb, 2014". Islamic Law and Society. 24 (3): 290–298. doi:10.1163/15685195-00243P05.
