= Poker Superstars season 3 results =

Poker Superstars Season 3, Brunson is champion

The third season of the Poker Superstars televised poker tournament commenced on 12 March 2006. The tournament had a knockout format, and Todd Brunson finished as winner, making over half a million dollars.

== Regular season results ==
Event	Winner	Runner-Up	Remainder Finishing Order
Elimination match #1	Antonio Esfandiari ($10,000)	Jennifer Tilly	Mimi Tran; Juan Carlos Mortensen; Cyndy Violette; Joe Hachem
Elimination match #2	Jeff Shulman ($10,000)	Barry Greenstein	Todd Brunson; Eli Elezra; Phil Ivey; Chris Ferguson
Elimination match #3	Mike Sexton ($10,000)	Phil Hellmuth Jr	Gus Hansen; Kassem "Freddy" Deeb; Jennifer Harman; Johnny Chan
Elimination match #4	Daniel Negreanu ($10,000)	Erick Lindgren	Greg Raymer; Ted Forrest; Chris Moneymaker; Mike Matusow
Elimination match #5	Chris Moneymaker ($10,000)	Antonio Esfandiari	Jeff Shulman; Chris Ferguson; Mimi Tran; Mike Matusow
Elimination match #6	Daniel Negreanu ($10,000)	Jennifer Harman	Cyndy Violette; Gus Hansen; Phil Ivey; Greg Raymer
Elimination match #7	Todd Brunson($10,000)	Joe Hachem	Johnny Chan; Juan Carlos Mortensen; Mike Sexton; Ted Forrest
Elimination match #8	Kassem "Freddy" Deeb ($10,000)	Phil Hellmuth Jr	Erick Lindgren; Barry Greenstein; Eli Elezra; Jennifer Tilly
Elimination match #9	Johnny Chan ($10,000)	Jeff Shulman	Phil Hellmuth Jr; Jennifer Harman; Chris Moneymaker; Mike Sexton
Elimination match #10	Mike Matusow ($10,000)	Barry Greenstein	Eli Elezra; Gus Hansen; Todd Brunson; Ted Forrest
Elimination match #11	Erick Lindgren ($10,000)	Juan Carlos Mortensen	Joe Hachem; Kassem "Freddy" Deeb; Mimi Tran; Jennifer Tilly
Elimination match #12	Chris Ferguson ($10,000)	Phil Ivey	Antonio Esfandiari; Daniel Negreanu; Cyndy Violette; Greg Raymer
Elimination match #13	Eli Elezra ($10,000)	Mike Matusow	Erick Lindgren; Juan Carlos Mortensen; Phil Hellmuth Jr; Gus Hansen
Elimination match #14	Barry Greenstein ($10,000)	Phil Ivey	Mike Sexton; Mimi Tran; Daniel Negreanu; Chris Moneymaker
Elimination match #15	Jennifer Tilly ($10,000)	Antonio Esfandiari	Greg Raymer; Chris Ferguson; Jennifer Harman; Ted Forrest
Elimination match #16	Jeff Shulman ($10,000)	Cyndy Violette	Johnny Chan; Todd Brunson; Kassem "Freddy" Deeb; Joe Hachem
Elimination match #17	Chris Ferguson ($10,000)	Jennifer Harman	Eli Elezra; Erick Lindgren; Johnny Chan; Greg Raymer
Elimination match #18	Jeff Shulman ($10,000)	Mike Matusow	Juan Carlos Mortensen; Mike Sexton; Ted Forrest; Jennifer Tilly
Elimination match #19	Todd Brunson ($10,000)	Joe Hachem	Mimi Tran; Daniel Negreanu; Cyndy Violette; Barry Greenstein
Elimination match #20	Gus Hansen ($10,000)	Antonio Esfandiari	Phil Ivey; Kassem "Freddy" Deeb; Chris Moneymaker; Phil Hellmuth Jr.
Super 16, Group A, Match 1	Mike Matusow ($15,000)	Jeff Shulman	Eli Elezra; Mike Sexton
Super 16, Group A, Match 2	Jeff Shulman ($15,000)	Eli Elezra	Mike Sexton
Super 16, Group B, Match 1	Johnny Chan ($15,000)	Antonio Esfandiari	Chris Ferguson; Phil Hellmuth
Super 16, Group B, Match 2	Antonio Esfandiari ($15,000)	Phil Hellmuth	Chris Ferguson
Super 16, Group C, Match 1	Freddy Deeb ($15,000)	Barry Greenstein	Gus Hansen; Erick Lindgren
Super 16, Group C, Match 2	Gus Hansen ($15,000)	Erick Lindgren	Barry Greenstein
Super 16, Group D, Match 1	Todd Brunson($15,000)	Daniel Negreanu	Carlos Mortensen; Phil Ivey
Super 16, Group D, Match 2	Carlos Mortensen ($15,000)	Daniel Negreanu	Phil Ivey
Quarter-Finals, Group A, Match 1	Antonio Esfandiari ($30,000)	Johnny Chan ($15,000)	Freddy Deeb; Carlos Mortensen
Quarter-Finals, Group A, Match 2	Johnny Chan ($30,000)	Freddy Deeb ($15,000)	Carlos Mortensen
Quarter-Finals, Group B, Match 1	Todd Brunson ($30,000)	Mike Matusow ($15,000)	Jeff Shulman; Gus Hansen
Quarter-Finals, Group B, Match 2	Gus Hansen ($30,000)	Mike Matusow ($15,000)	Jeff Shulman
Semi-Finals, Group A	Antonio Esfandiari ($50,000)	Gus Hansen ($30,000)	
Semi-Finals, Group B	Todd Brunson ($50,000)	Johnny Chan ($30,000)	
Final	Todd Brunson ($400,000)	Antonio Esfandiari ($140,000)	

== Elimination round point standings ==
=== Group and Chip Setup ===
The players whose names appear in bold qualified to advance to the next round.

==== Finals ====
- **Champion - Todd Brunson (2,000,000 chips)** (Won 3 of 5)
- Antonio Esfandiari (2,000,000 chips) (Won 0 of 5)

==== Semifinals ====
Group A:

- **Antonio Esfandiari (1,500,000 chips)** (Won 2 of 3)
- Gus Hansen (1,000,000 chips) (Won 1 of 3)

Group B:

- **Todd Brunson (1,500,000 chips)** (Won 2 of 3)
- Johnny Chan (1,000,000 chips) (Won 1 of 3)

==== Quarterfinals ====
Group A:

- **Johnny Chan (600,000 chips)**
- Freddy Deeb (600,000 chips)
- **Antonio Esfandiari (400,000 chips)**
- Carlos Mortensen (400,000 chips)

Group B:

- **Todd Brunson (600,000 chips)**
- Mike Matusow (600,000 chips)
- Jeff Shulman (400,000 chips)
- **Gus Hansen (400,000 chips)**

==== Super Sixteen ====
Group A:

- **Jeff Shulman (840,000 chips)**
- Eli Elezra (480,000 chips)
- **Mike Matusow (480,000 chips)**
- Mike Sexton (380,000 chips)

Group B:

- **Antonio Esfandiari (720,000 chips)**
- Chris Ferguson (520,000 chips)
- **Johnny Chan (420,000 chips)**
- Phil Hellmuth (400,000 chips)

Group C:

- Erick Lindgren (600,000 chips)
- Barry Greenstein (540,000 chips)
- **Gus Hansen (420,000 chips)**
- **Freddy Deeb (400,000 chips)**

Group D:

- **Todd Brunson (580,000 chips)**
- Daniel Negreanu (540,000 chips)
- Phil Ivey (420,000 chips)
- **Carlos Mortensen (420,000 chips)**

=== Final standings after the elimination round ===
==== Qualifiers for the Super 16 ====
- 42 - Jeff Shulman (1st, 3rd, 2nd, 1st, 1st)
- 36 - Antonio Esfandiari (1st, 2nd, 3rd, 2nd, 2nd)
- 30 - Erick Lindgren (2nd, 3rd, 1st, 3rd, 4th)
- 29 - Todd Brunson (3rd, 1st, 5th, 4th, 1st)
- 27 - Daniel Negreanu (1st, 1st, 4th, 5th, 4th)
- 27 - Barry Greenstein (2nd, 4th, 2nd, 1st, 6th)
- 26 - Chris Ferguson (6th, 4th, 1st, 4th, 1st)
- 24 - Mike Matusow (6th, 6th, 1st, 2nd, 2nd)
- 24 - Eli Elezra (4th, 5th, 3rd, 1st, 3rd)
- 21 - Johnny Chan (6th, 3rd, 1st, 3rd, 5th)
- 21 - Gus Hansen (3rd, 4th, 4th, 6th, 1st)
- 21 - Phil Ivey (5th, 5th, 2nd, 2nd, 3rd)
- 21 - Juan Carlos Mortensen (4th, 4th, 2nd, 4th, 3rd)
- 20 - Kassem "Freddy" Deeb (4th, 1st, 4th, 5th, 4th)
- 20 - Phil Hellmuth Jr. (2nd, 2nd, 3rd, 5th, 6th)
- 19 - Mike Sexton (1st, 5th, 6th, 3rd, 4th)

==== Eliminated ====
- 19 - Joe Hachem (6th, 2nd, 3rd, 6th, 2nd)
- 19 - Jennifer Harman (5th, 2nd, 4th, 5th, 2nd)
- 17 - Jennifer Tilly (2nd, 6th, 6th, 1st, 6th)
- 15 - Mimi Tran (3rd, 5th, 5th, 4th, 3rd)
- 15 - Cyndy Violette (5th, 3rd, 5th, 2nd, 5th)
- 13 - Chris Moneymaker (5th, 1st, 5th, 6th, 5th)
- 10 - Greg Raymer (3rd, 6th, 6th, 3rd, 6th)
- 4 - Ted Forrest (4th, 6th, 6th, 6th, 5th)

== Profits and losses ==
=== Winners ===
- 1. Todd Brunson: $515,000 (+$465,000)
- 2. Antonio Esfandiari: $245,000 (+$195,000)
- 3. Johnny Chan: $100,000 (+$50,000)
- 4. Gus Hansen: $85,000 (+$35,000)
- 5. Mike Matusow: $55,000 (+$5,000)

=== Losers ===
- 6. Jeff Shulman: $45,000 (-$5,000)
- 7. Freddy Deeb: $40,000 (-$10,000)
- 8. Chris Ferguson: $20,000 (-$30,000)
- 9. Daniel Negreanu: $20,000 (-$30,000)
- 10. Juan Mortensen: $15,000 (-$35,000)
- 11. Eli Elezra: $10,000 (-$40,000)
- 12. Barry Greenstein: $10,000 (-$40,000)
- 13. Erick Lindgren: $10,000 (-$40,000)
- 14. Chris Moneymaker: $10,000 (-$40,000)
- 15. Mike Sexton: $10,000 (-$40,000)
- 16. Jennifer Tilly: $10,000 (-$40,000)
- 17. Ted Forrest: $0 (-$50,000)
- 18. Joe Hachem: $0 (-$50,000)
- 19. Jennifer Harmen: $0 (-$50,000)
- 20. Phil Hellmuth: $0 (-$50,000)
- 21. Phil Ivey: $0 (-$50,000)
- 22. Greg Raymer: $0 (-$50,000)
- 23. Miami Tran: $0 (-$50,000)
- 24. Cindy Violette: $0 (-$50,000)
