= Cecilia Bolocco =

Chilean actress, beauty queen and TV host

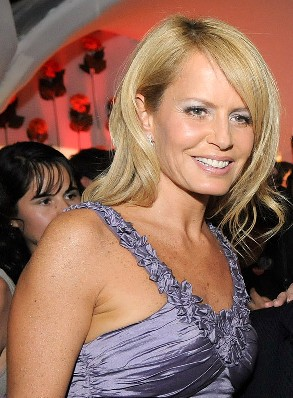
- Bolocco at the 2010 Chilean telethon
- Born: Cecilia Carolina Bolocco Fonck; May 19, 1965 (age 61); Santiago, Chile
- Occupations: Television host, fashion designer
- Height: 1.64 m (5 ft 5 in)
- Spouses: Michael Young (m. 1990; div. 2001); Carlos Menem (m. 2001; div. 2011); José Patricio Daire Barrios (m. 2022)
- Children: 1
- Beauty pageant titleholder
- Hair color: Brown
- Eye color: Green
- Major competitions: Miss Chile 1987 (Winner); Miss Universe 1987 (Winner)

Cecilia Carolina Bolocco Fonck (born May 19, 1965) is a Chilean actress, TV host and beauty pageant titleholder who was crowned Miss Universo Chile 1987 and Miss Universe 1987.

Bolocco has worked as a journalist on the Spanish language edition of CNN, on Telemundo and on various programs for Chilean Television and acted on the soap opera Morelia.

Between 2001 and 2011 she was married to the 44th President of Argentina Carlos Menem and they have a son together.

== Early life ==
Bolocco was born in Santiago, Chile, to Enzo Bolocco Cintolesi, an Arbëreshë (Italo-Albanian) businessman and Rose Marie Fonck Assler. She attended primary and secondary school at Santiago College. She then studied a year of civil engineering at the University of Santiago, Chile, before dropping out to pursue costume design at the INCA-CEA Institute.

== Miss Universe ==
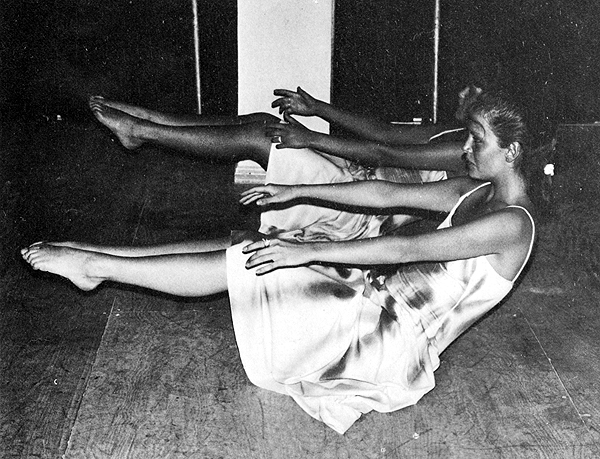
Bolocco during her ballet classes in 1985.

Bolocco was selected Miss Chile for Miss Universe on April 20, 1987. On May 26, 1987, she beat 67 contestants to become the first Chilean to win the Miss Universe beauty pageant that was held at the World Trade Centre in Singapore that year. During her year-long reign, she settled in Los Angeles, California. Her reign was the last pageant hosted by Bob Barker.

== After the crown ==
Bolocco began a television career in Chile with the show Porque hoy es sábado ("Because it's Saturday") on Televisión Nacional de Chile. She then co-hosted Martes 13 ("Tuesday the 13th") on Channel 13. The program name is a play on the English idiomatic expression about Friday the 13th, where in Chile the unlucky day is Tuesday the 13th.

In March 1990, Bolocco married American television producer Michael Young in Santiago. The local media covered the event as if it were a royal wedding.

Bolocco moved to Atlanta, Georgia to work as an anchorwoman for the Spanish section at CNN produced for Telemundo Network, in June 1990. Then, she became a full-fledged member of the Telemundo family where she hosted the afternoon lifestyles program La Buena Vida ("The Good Life"). The show was merged with another newsmagazine titled Ocurrió así ("It Happened This Way") and Esta noche con Cecilia Bolocco ("Tonight With Cecilia Bolocco") followed, for which she won two Emmy awards.

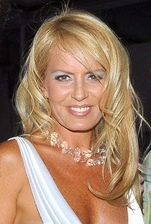
Cecilia Bolocco cropped image

She then took a starring role as the evil Karina Lafontaine de Montero in the Mexican Televisa's hit soap opera Morelia, which was aired to more than 70 countries throughout the Americas, including Chile, and Europe.

Around the mid-1990s, Bolocco ended her relationship with husband Michael Young. The marriage was annulled, because no divorce law existed in Chile at the time.

In 1993 Bolocco co-hosted the 1993 Miss Universe pageant in the Auditorio Nacional in Mexico City.

In 1995 Bolocco co-hosted the closing night of the 36th Viña del Mar International Song Festival, held every year in Viña del Mar, Chile.

In October 1996, Bolocco took the job as co-host in one of the shows with the highest ratings in Chilean television history, Viva el lunes ("Long Live Monday"), alongside Kike Morandé and comedian Álvaro Salas. At the same time, she had a radio show and appeared in her own television show, La noche de Cecilia ("The Night of Cecilia").

Also in 1996 Bolocco was a judge in the 1996 Miss Universe pageant in Las Vegas, Nevada.

In February, 2000, Bolocco became an established hostess for the Viña del Mar Song Festival, with partner and longtime host Antonio Vodanovic.

In August 2001 Bolocco's marriage to Young was annulled. On 26 May 2001, Bolocco married former Argentine president Carlos Menem in La Rioja, Argentina, whom she met while interviewing him at the Casa Rosada presidential house in Argentina. On November 19, 2003, their first son, Máximo Saúl Menem Bolocco, was born in Santiago, Chile. They separated in April 2007 and officially divorced in May 2011.

== See also ==
- List of television presenters/Chile

Awards and achievements
Preceded by (Venezuela) Bárbara Palacios	Miss Universe; 1987	Succeeded by (Thailand) Porntip Nakhirunkanok
Preceded by Mariana Villasante	Miss Chile; 1987	Succeeded by Verónica Romero
Media offices
Preceded by Leeza Gibbons and Angela Visser	Miss Universe color commentator (with Angela Visser); 1993	Succeeded by Arthel Neville and Angela Visser
