= Gabriel Traversari =

American actor

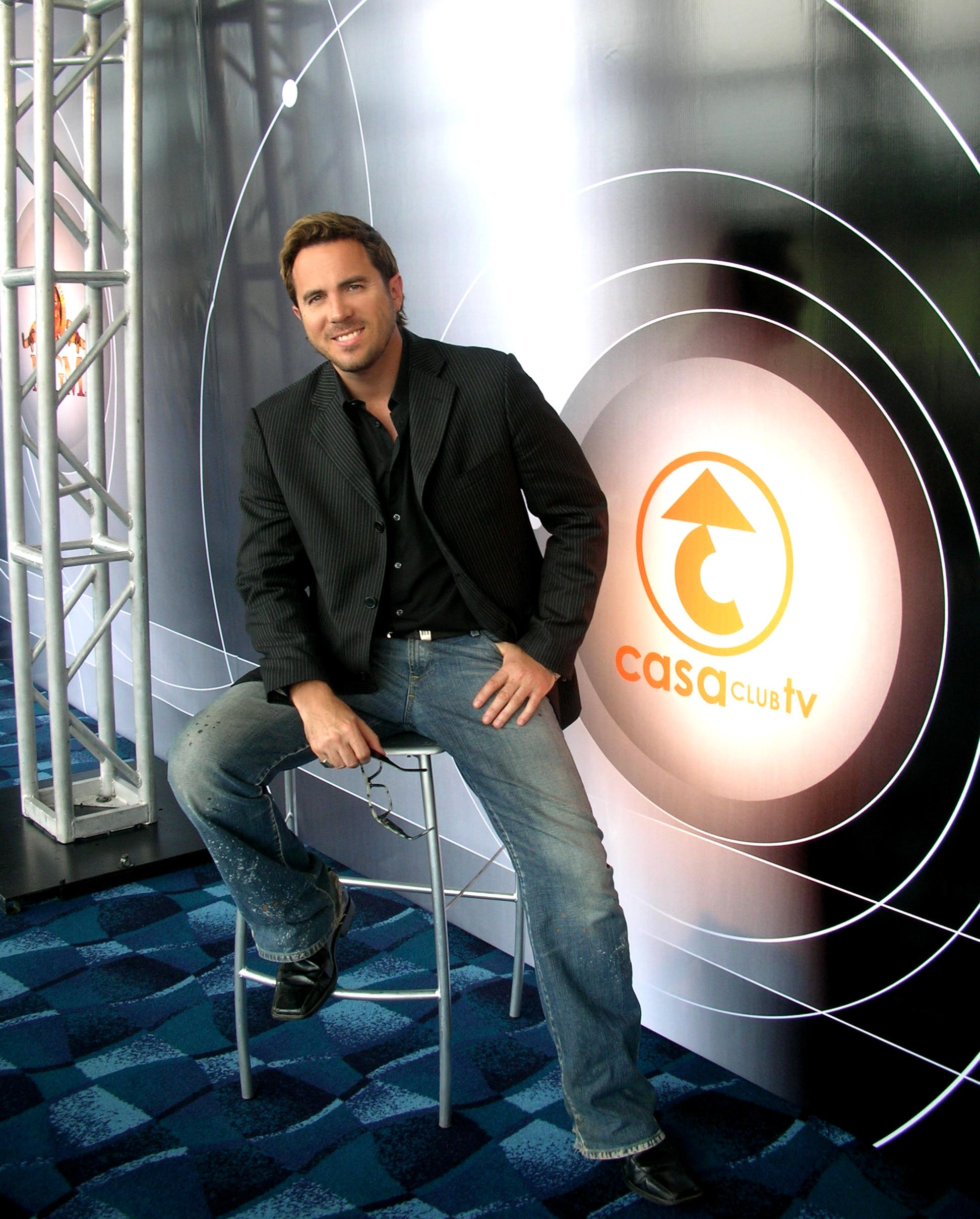
- Born: Gabriel Augusto Traversari y Debayle; September 7, 1963; Los Angeles, California, U.S.
- Education: Florida State University (B.A.)
- Alma mater: Florida State University
- Years active: 1980s–present
- Known for: Acting, directing, writing, singing, painting, photography
- Notable work: TV Mujer, Murder on the Border, Before the Dawn

Gabriel Traversari (born Gabriel Augusto Traversari y Debayle on September 7, 1963) is a Nicaraguan American actor, director, writer, singer, songwriter, painter and photographer.

== Early life ==
Traversari was born in Los Angeles, California, but grew up in El Crucero, a municipality just outside Managua, Nicaragua.

He attended the Rectory School, a junior boarding school in Pomfret, Connecticut, and graduated from Middlesex School in Concord, Massachusetts. Traversari went on to graduate from Florida State University in Tallahassee, Florida, with a Bachelor of Arts in acting. While in school he performed on stage in Twelfth Night (as Antonio), The Apple Tree (as Adam), Princess Ida (as Cyril), Macbeth (as Macduff), Infancy (as Avonzino), What the Butler Saw (as Nick), The Sea Gull (as Trigorin), Romeo and Juliet (as Romeo), The Lost Colony (as A. Dare/J. Borden) and Camino Real (as Abdullah).

== Career ==
Once Traversari graduated from college he moved to Miami, where he was hired as the co-host of Univision's first major original production, TV Mujer (1988–1990), an international talk show which he co-hosted for three years. Traversari also starred in other popular television programs which aired in Latin America and Spain including "Mejorando su Hogar", the first home improvement show produced in Spanish in the United States, and "Casa Club Magazine".

Traversari went on to produce, direct and host "Un Día de Fama" and many episodes for the "Behind the Scenes" series for E! Entertainment, in Latin America. He also became that network's Miami-based entertainment correspondent for over three years.

In 2004 he began hosting "Esotérica" on Cosmopolitan Television. He was also cast as one of the lead voices for the Spanish version of Duckman, the Emmy Award-winning cartoon, and as the voice of "Juan del Diablo" in the English translation of the soap opera, Corazón Salvaje. He has made small appearances as an extra on various television series such as Miami Vice (1988), as well as small, credited appearances in movies such as Something Wild (1986), Once Upon A Time in America (1984) and Two Much (1995). He was cast as the lead in the independent low budget feature, "Murder on the Border", where he starred alongside Mexican actress Alpha Acosta (2005). He has also appeared in various Spanish speaking TV shows such as "Decisiones" and "Lotería" and three Telemundo soap operas "Anita no te Rajes", "El Cuerpo del Deseo" and "Pecados Ajenos".
