= United Artists Releasing =

Film distribution successor to United Artists

United Artists Releasing, LLC
- Logo used from 2019 to 2023
- Formerly: MGM/Annapurna Pictures (2017–2019)
- Type: Joint venture
- Industry: Film
- Predecessor: United Artists Corporation
- Founded: October 31, 2017; 8 years ago
- Founder: Gary Barber; Megan Ellison
- Defunct: March 4, 2023; 3 years ago
- Fate: Folded into Metro-Goldwyn-Mayer
- Successor: Metro-Goldwyn-Mayer; Amazon MGM Studios; United Artists
- Headquarters: West Hollywood and Los Angeles, California, United States
- Number of locations: 2
- Area served: United States
- Key people: Erik Lomis (president); Pam Kunath (COO)
- Products: Motion pictures
- Services: Film distribution and promotion
- Owners: Metro-Goldwyn-Mayer; Annapurna Pictures
- Number of employees: 230 (2022)
- Website: Official website (archived)

United Artists Releasing, LLC (UAR) was an American film distribution joint venture between Metro-Goldwyn-Mayer and Annapurna Pictures and the successor to United Artists (UA) that operated from October 31, 2017 to March 4, 2023.

Founded by former MGM CEO Gary Barber and Annapurna founder Megan Ellison on October 31, 2017, it operated within the offices of the headquarters of the respective companies in West Hollywood and Los Angeles in California and offered alternative services to the major film studios and streaming media companies with 10–14 films released annually. The venture rebranded as United Artists Releasing on February 5, 2019, to commemorate 100 years since the founding of United Artists.

On May 26, 2021, online shopping and technology company Amazon acquired MGM Holdings, the former parent company of MGM, for $8.45 billion which closed on March 17, 2022, and consequentially placed United Artists Releasing under the control of Amazon Studios. Amazon then folded United Artists Releasing into MGM on March 4, 2023, in a push towards theatrical distribution alongside streaming releases on their streaming service Amazon Prime Video.

== History ==
American media companies Metro-Goldwyn-Mayer and Annapurna Pictures announced the formation of a local film distribution joint-venture and a film releasing entity under the name Mirror to release third-party films in theatres. This marked the return of MGM to domestic distribution seven years after its closure following the 2010 bankruptcy and subsequent reorganization, in which approximately six to eight films would be released commencing on March 2, 2018 with the release of Death Wish.

The initial staff of the joint venture composed of those of Annapurna's own distribution division. By January 31, 2019, the venture released eight titles in total, none of which were credited under the touted Mirror Releasing banner.

The joint venture was rebranded on February 5, 2019 to United Artists Releasing, in commemoration of a century (100 years) of the creation of the original United Artists, with the rationale being to "better compete against the major studios, especially with respect to their tentpole films that dictate the release calendar".

Former Screen Gems executive Pam Kunath was appointed to be its chief operating officer and one of MGM's subsidiaries, Orion Pictures, added its films and staff from its distribution division to the venture. A board of directors consisting of executives from the partner companies was created to oversee the three UAR executives; Kunath, David Kaminow and president of Annapurna's distribution and marketing, Erik Lomis.

The inaugural film release post-rebrand was the 2019 stop-motion animated film Missing Link, which won the company its inaugural and only Golden Globe Award for Best Animated Feature Film.

On October 7, 2020, MGM revived the American International Pictures label for digital and limited theatrical releases of acquired films with United Artists Releasing, beginning with the 2021 film Breaking News in Yuba County.

On May 17, 2021, online shopping and technology company Amazon entered negotiations to acquire MGM's former parent company, MGM Holdings, principally green-lighted by MGM board chairman Kevin Ulrich whose company, Anchorage Capital Group, was a major MGM shareholder. A week later, the proposed acquisition by Amazon was officially announced, pending local and global regulatory approvals, for $8.45 billion and completed on March 17, 2022. Later that same day, Mike Hopkins, senior vice president of Amazon Studios and Amazon Prime Video, emphasized at a town hall meeting that his company would continue to partner with its new division United Artists Releasing, which would remain in operation post-acquisition.

On March 4, 2023, The Hollywood Reporter revealed that Amazon folded United Artists Releasing into MGM due to Amazon's optimism of the feasibility of theatrical distribution. The announcement was a day after Creed III was released, which was also the first film distributed by MGM itself under Amazon's ownership.

== Filmography ==
MGM/Annapurna joint-venture
Release date	Title	Company	Co-producer(s)	International distributor
March 2, 2018	Death Wish	MGM	Cave 76 Productions	
July 6, 2018	Sorry to Bother You	Annapurna	Significant Productions; MNM Creative; MACRO; Cinereach; The Space Program	Universal Pictures; Focus Features
August 29, 2018	Operation Finale	MGM	Automatik Entertainment	Netflix
September 21, 2018	The Sisters Brothers	Annapurna	Why Not Productions; Page 114 Productions	IMR International
December 14, 2018	If Beale Street Could Talk	Annapurna	Plan B Entertainment; Pastel Productions	
December 25, 2018	Vice	Annapurna	Plan B Entertainment; Gary Sanchez Productions	
December 25, 2018	Destroyer	Annapurna	30West; Automatik Entertainment	Rocket Science
February 15, 2019	Fighting with My Family	MGM	Seven Bucks Productions; Misher Films; WWE Studios; Film4; The Ink Factory	Lionsgate (UK and Ireland); Universal Pictures (International)
United Artists Releasing
April 12, 2019	Missing Link	Annapurna	Laika	AGC International
May 10, 2019	The Hustle	MGM	Pin High Productions; Cave 76 Productions; Camp Sugar Productions	Universal Pictures
May 24, 2019	Booksmart	Annapurna	Gloria Sanchez Productions	
June 21, 2019	Child's Play	Orion Pictures	Bron Studios	
August 16, 2019	Where'd You Go, Bernadette	Annapurna	Color Force; Detour Filmproduction	
October 11, 2019	The Addams Family	MGM	Bron Studios; The Jackal Group; Whalerock Industries; Cinesite Studios	Universal Pictures
January 31, 2020	Gretel & Hansel	Orion Pictures	Bron Studios; Automatik Entertainment	
May 8, 2020	Valley Girl	Orion Classics; MGM	Sneak Preview Productions	
August 28, 2020	Bill & Ted Face the Music	Orion Pictures	Hammerstone Studios; Dial 9; Dungan Entertainment; TinRes Entertainment; Endeavor Content	
October 9, 2020	The Wolf of Snow Hollow	Orion Classics	A New Form; Vanishing Angle; XYZ Films	
February 12, 2021	Breaking News in Yuba County	American International Pictures	Wyolah Films; AGC Studios; Nine Stories Productions	AGC International
March 26, 2021	Bad Trip	Orion Pictures	Gorilla Flicks; The District; Helo Films	Netflix
May 7, 2021	Wrath of Man	MGM	Miramax; Toff Guy Films	Miramax International
July 20, 2021	How It Ends	American International Pictures	Mister Lister Films	
August 13, 2021	Respect	MGM	Bron Studios; Glickmania; One Community	Universal Pictures
August 20, 2021	Flag Day	MGM	Conqueror Productions; Olive Hill Media; Wonderful Films	Rocket Science; Wild Bunch
October 1, 2021	The Addams Family 2	MGM	Bron Studios; The Jackal Group; Whalerock Industries; Cinesite Studios	Universal Pictures
October 8, 2021	No Time to Die	MGM	Eon Productions	Universal Pictures
November 24, 2021	House of Gucci	MGM	Bron Studios; Scott Free Productions	Universal Pictures
November 26, 2021	Licorice Pizza	MGM	Focus Features; Ghoulardi Film Company	Universal Pictures
February 18, 2022	Dog	MGM	FilmNation Entertainment; Free Association	FilmNation Entertainment
February 25, 2022	Cyrano	MGM	Bron Studios; Working Title Films	Universal Pictures
May 13, 2022	On the Count of Three	Annapurna Pictures; Orion Pictures	Werner Entertainment; Valparaiso Pictures	Independent Entertainment
July 22, 2022	Anything's Possible	Orion Pictures	Andrew Lauren Productions; Killer Films	
July 29, 2022	Thirteen Lives	MGM	Imagine Entertainment; Magnolia Mae Films; Storyteller Productions	Limited theatrical release only with streaming release by Amazon Studios on Amazon Prime Video
August 26, 2022	Samaritan	MGM	Balboa Productions	Limited theatrical release only with streaming release by Amazon Studios on Amazon Prime Video
August 26, 2022	Three Thousand Years of Longing	MGM	FilmNation Entertainment; Elevate Production Finance; Sunac Culture; Kennedy Miller Mitchell	FilmNation Entertainment
September 9, 2022	About Fate	American International Pictures	Aldamisa Entertainment; Contentious Media; Vincent Newman Entertainment	
October 28, 2022	Till	Orion Pictures	Frederick Zollo Productions; Eon Productions	Universal Pictures
November 23, 2022	Bones and All	MGM	Frenesy Film Company; Per Capita Productions; The Apartment Pictures; Memo Films; 3 Marys Entertainment	Warner Bros. Pictures
December 23, 2022	Women Talking	Orion Pictures	Plan B Entertainment; Hear/Say Productions	Universal Pictures
March 24, 2023	A Good Person	MGM	Killer Films; Elevation Pictures	Rocket Science
April 7, 2023	On a Wing and a Prayer	MGM; Amazon Studios	LightWorkers Media	
October 13, 2023	Dark Harvest	MGM	Matt Tolmach Productions	
