= Brian Lockwood (director) =

American television director (born 1959)

- Born: May 19, 1959 (age 65); Clearwater, Florida, United States
- Occupation(s): Television director, film editor
- Years active: 1983–present
- Spouse: Tina Lockwood
- Website: http://brianlockwood.com//

Brian Lockwood (born May 19, 1959) is an American television director. He has made numerous music videos for artist such as: The Pretenders, Bon Jovi, Metallica and Mötley Crüe. His sports and entertainment specials have included Directing the X Games, running the International master control for The Academy Awards and directing the "Tournament of Roses Parade". In 1987 Lockwood founded Broadcast Edit, a post-production and studio facility operating from Southern California. He currently resides in Huntington Beach, California with his wife Tina and raises guide dogs for Guide Dogs of America.

== Career ==
Lockwood directed MTV's "My New BFF Special" by Paris Hilton, Animal Planet's "Trail Mix", and 14 "Miss Hawaiian Tropic International" pageants. Brian has also directed concert specials and music videos for George Strait, Bon Jovi, Cypress Hill, Dave Matthews Band, Eric Clapton, Extreme, Elton John, Great White, Fall Out Boy, Stephen Marley, Sheryl Crow, Skid Row, Linkin Park, Mötley Crüe, John Mellencamp, Neil Young, Peter Gabriel, Pussycat Dolls, The Smashing Pumpkins, The Pretenders, Twisted Sister, Willie Nelson, Van Halen and Metallica. He has also directed 13 Budweiser commercials and Comedy Central's comedy/dating hybrid show "Defending Your Date".

Lockwood has also directed more than 190 episodes of poker programming including NBC's "Poker After Dark" & "National Heads-Up Poker Championship", "Poker Superstars Invitational Tournament" for FSN, and the "United States Poker Championship",“Pro-Am Poker Equalizer" and "The World Series of Poker" for ESPN. He has also done sports programming for shows such as "Championship Boxing" for DSKN, "NASCAR Racing" for Fox Sports and Speed Channel, "Supercross" for CBS, the "U.S. Pro Ski Tour" for ABC, TORC: The Off Road Championship for NBC, Fox Sports and beIN Sports & and the "Professional Bull Riders Tour" for Turner Network Television. Lockwood is a member of the Directors Guild of America.

== Awards ==
Brian has won many awards, including a Billboard Music Award for "Best Jazz/Adult Contemporary" for his Boxing Gandhis video and has won three Telly Awards. He has had 7 Emmy Award nominations and three wins.
