= Casa Club Magazine =

20th-century Latin American television series

Casa Club Magazine was the flagship show for MGM Latin America Hosted by Gabriel Traversari, Patrice Martial and famous singer and host Vicky Larraz.The show aired throughout Latin America throughout the late 1980s and early 2000s. The Show was produced by Fran Mires and JB Diederich. 130 one hour episodes were recorded.
