= Intissar Abdulmomen =

Egyptian writer and novelist

- Born: Beheira Governorate
- Occupations: Writer, novelist
- Years active: 2010–present

Intissar Abdulmomen (Arabic: انتصار عبد المنعم), an Egyptian writer and novelist. She has published three short story collections as well as numerous novels and children's stories. She has won several awards including the first place prize in the competition of Ihsan Abdel Quddous in story in 2010, the Children's Cultural Books Series Award from the Arab Bureau of Education for the Gulf States in 2012, and the State Encouragement Prize in Literature in 2014.

== Education and career ==
Intissar Abdulmomen is an Egyptian writer born in Edku in the Beheira Governorate. She has published three short stories collections, and numerous novels and children's stories. Abdelmomen began her writing career when she was studying in high school. She wrote some poems and stories and published them in her school's magazine. In 2008, she released her first collection of short stories, titled When the Female Wakes Up which won the Ghaffar Makkawi Prize, one of the Egyptian Writers Union Awards. In 2010, Abdulmomen published her second book, entitled Memoirs of a Former Sister ... My Story with the Muslim Brotherhood, in which she talked about her previous experiences joining the Muslim Brotherhood in Egypt and the story of leaving them. In her book, Abdulmomen also addressed several topics and narrated her personal experience. She criticized the Muslim Brotherhood's treatment of women and the discrimination that exists between men and women.

In addition to her literary works, Abdelmomen has literary and critical studies that were published in several Arab newspapers and magazines, including Akhbar Al-Adab, New Culture magazine, Nizma magazine, and Al Youm newspaper. In 2014, her novel The News Bulletin Did Not Remember ... The Chronicle of the Wandering Years was translated into Spanish and was published by the Spanish Publishing house Arania Editorial. During the past years, Abdulmomen won a number of literary prizes including the first place prize in Ihsan Abdel Quddous competition in story in 2010, the Children's Cultural Book Series Awards for the Arab Education Office in 2012, the Dr. Abdel Ghaffar Makkawi Prize, which is one of the award of the Egyptian Writers Union.

== Awards ==
Abdelmomen received the following awards:

- Prize for the Children's Cultural Book Series of the Arab Bureau of Education, 2012
- First Center Award in the Ihsan Abdel Quddous in Story Competition, 2010
- Dr. Abdel Ghaffar Makkawi Prize for her stor collection "When the Female Wakes Up", 2012
- Prize for the Children's Cultural Book Series of the Arab Bureau of Education for the Gulf States for the book "The Bald Princess", 2012.
- State Incentive Award in Literature, 2014.
- Youssef Abouria Prize for Novel, 2018.
