= David Doyle (producer) =

American television producer

David Doyle is an American television producer.

He has produced factual and entertainment television programs since 1995.

Doyle has developed and produced original factual and entertainment projects with numerous broadcast and cable networks and was at the heart of the televised poker boom, having produced nine distinct poker programs for four different networks including NBC’s Poker Superstars Invitational Tournament and ESPN’s United States Poker Championship. His varied career includes work on projects ranging from independent, single-camera documentaries such as the critically acclaimed PBS series Lords of the Mafia, to pilots, series and specials for cable nets including Sci Fi Channel, TNT, VH1, Travel Channel and Comedy Central, to live multi-camera broadcast specials such as the Academy Awards and the primetime Emmy Awards.

Doyle was the Vice President of Program Development and Production for Discovery Communications Animal Planet. During his tenure at Animal Planet Doyle made a significant impact on a variety of projects including the network’s most watched special to date, the primetime Emmy nominated Dragons: A Fantasy Made Real a.k.a. The Last Dragon (docudrama). Also, Meerkat Manor, the critically acclaimed wildlife docu-soap series that Doyle brought to the network, was watched by more households than any other series premiere in the network’s history and continues to perform so well in subsequent seasons that it has spawned a feature film, Flower: Queen of the Kalahari. Additionally, David was instrumental in developing timely programs on topical issues such as Tsunami: Animal Instincts and Animal Planet Heroes: Hurricane Rescues & Animal Planet Heroes: Hurricane Reunions as well as whimsical programs the likes of The World’s Ugliest Dog Competition, and the counter-programming stunt Puppy Bowl that garners over 7.5 million viewers on Super Bowl Sunday annually. Under Doyle’s watch, content improvements and ratings goals were achieved on such network program stalwarts as Mutual of Omaha’s Wild Kingdom, Planet’s Funniest Animals and the Animal Cops franchise.

Doyle produced two radio morning shows in San Diego, California and one of the first daily web-based comedy shows for MSN, Second City Headline News. He began his show business career as an award-winning comedian/magician performing at clubs and colleges across the nation and made guest appearances on several national television programs.

In 2014 Doyle received a Daytime Emmy Award for the series "Ocean Mysteries with Jeff Corwin" in the category Outstanding Travel Program, in 2015 for the series The Henry Ford's Innovation Nation in the category Outstanding Special Class Program and two more in 2016, for the series Sea Rescue in the category Outstanding Children's Series and also for the series Lucky Dog in the category Outstanding Special Class Program.

== Personal life ==
Doyle majored in Communications at California State Polytechnic University in Pomona, Calif. He is a member of the Producers Guild of America, Academy of Television Arts & Sciences, Screen Actors Guild, American Federation of Television and Radio Artists and the Academy of Magical Arts.
