= Alistair Cooke's America =

Book

Alistair Cooke's America is a tie-in book to Alistair Cooke's 13-part television documentary series America: A Personal History of the United States. The book sold almost two million copies. It was published by Alfred A. Knopf in New York, 1973. The book has 11 chapters, and 393 pages filled with stories of the American Founding Fathers and their journey to build America as we see it today. The book has many full page spreads of paintings and photography ranging from the 18th century to the 1970s.
