= Acércate a Rocío =

Mexican television talk show

- Also known as: Get Close to Rocío
- Genre: Talk show
- Presented by: Rocío Sánchez Azuara
- Country of origin: Mexico
- Original language: Spanish

Original release
- Network: TV Azteca
- Release: 2023 – present

Related
- Rocío a tu lado

Acércate a Rocío (Get Close to Rocío) is a Mexican television talk show. It is shown on TV Azteca and hosted by Rocío Sánchez Azuara. The show began as Rocío a tu lado (Rocío by Your Side) before moving to TV Azteca, where it was changed to its current name. The show began with the new name in 2023.

The show is shown on Azteca Uno in Mexico, and on Telemundo in the United States. It is also available for streaming online on the TV Azteca website and on the NBC one.
