= MGM Holdings =

Holding company of Metro-Goldwyn-Mayer (2005–2023)

MGM Holdings, Inc. Metro-Goldwyn-Mayer Holdings, Inc.
- Type: Subsidiary
- Industry: Entertainment; Mass media
- Founded: February 11, 2005; 21 years ago
- Defunct: October 3, 2023; 2 years ago
- Fate: Merged with Amazon Studios to form Amazon MGM Studios
- Successor: Amazon MGM Studios
- Headquarters: MGM Place, 245 North Beverly Drive, Beverly Hills, California, U.S.
- Area served: Worldwide
- Products: Motion pictures; Television programs
- Revenue: ▲US$1.3 billion (2017)
- Operating income: ▲US$238 million (2017)
- Net income: ▲US$548 million (2017)
- Total assets: ▲US$4.2 billion (2017)
- Total equity: ▲US$3.2 billion (2017)
- Parent: Amazon (2022–2023)
- Subsidiaries: Metro-Goldwyn-Mayer
- Website: mgm.com

MGM Holdings, Inc. (sometimes legally referred to in full as Metro-Goldwyn-Mayer Holdings, Inc. in official documents) was an American holding company based in Beverly Hills, California. It was launched on February 11, 2005 by a creditor-oriented consortium, and is the former parent company of Metro-Goldwyn-Mayer (from which the "MGM" initials were coined). Technology company Amazon acquired the company on March 17, 2022 and later merged it with its Amazon Studios subsidiary on October 3, 2023, forming Amazon MGM Studios.

== History ==
MGM Holdings was formed by a Sony-led consortium on February 11, 2005, which acquired MGM on April 8 in a US$4.8 billion leveraged buyout. From that period until its emergence from bankruptcy on December 20, 2010, MGM Holdings was owned by Providence Equity Partners (29%), TPG Inc. (21%), Sony Corporation of America (20%), Comcast (20%), DLJ Merchant Banking Partners (7%), and Quadrangle Group (3%).

=== Attempted sale and bankruptcy protection ===
After being installed in August 2009 as MGM's new CEO, Stephen Cooper tried to convince MGM's lenders that they should restructure the company's long-term debt to allow the studio to continue with its current business model. The lenders refused to do so and argued that a sale was the only way to recoup their investment. Cooper agreed to conduct an auction to gauge the level of interest by potential buyers and the value of the assets for sale.

On November 12, MGM announced it was "beginning a process to explore various strategic alternatives including operating as a standalone entity, forming strategic partnerships and evaluating a potential sale of the company." Alternatives the company was exploring included the sale of the company or merger with another media firm, or an asset auction, which could have included the sale of its 4,000-title film and television library, the company logo, rights to the James Bond franchise, and half-ownership in the three Hobbit films. The studio also held out the possibility of gaining a large influx of cash from new investors, although industry analysts believed that alternative was unlikely to happen. Some industry analysts said sale of the studio could net $1.5 billion to $3 billion. Others pegged the value at between $2 billion to $2.5 billion. Potential buyers included Time Warner (which already owned the pre-May 1986 MGM library, had enough cash reserves, and co-produced the Hobbit films with MGM), Qualia Capital (a private equity fund led by Hollywood producer Amir Malin), 20th Century Fox (MGM's home entertainment distributor), and Lionsgate.

MGM also announced that its creditors agreed to a forbearance on the company's debt payments originally until January 31, 2010, but the forbearance was extended to March 31.

As of early December 2009, 16 companies had expressed interest in purchasing all or parts of MGM, although only two had actually negotiated a confidentiality agreement that would allow them to examine MGM's financial statements. The Hollywood Reporter said Warner Bros., 20th Century Fox, and Lionsgate were the leading suitors for the company. Industry observers worried, however, that buyers might only bid on a few of MGM's assets such as the James Bond film franchise or The Hobbit film which would draw bids of less than $1 billion. At least one industry trade publication said creditors would accept offers amounting to $2 billion for parts or all of the studio. Even a bid or bids totalling $1.8 billion might be accepted, industry observers said, if the buyer agreed to "schmuck insurance" (the right to convert debt to equity, under certain conditions and time-frames). On December 18, press reports said that News Corporation's 20th Century Fox film studio had been interested in purchasing MGM, but it could not agree to the "restrictive" terms of MGM's nondisclosure agreement, which in part do not permit potential buyers to speak with MGM's creditors. The strict terms of the nondisclosure agreement also led two other potential buyers to refuse to participate, and several others were negotiating over the terms and unable to participate in the process. The due diligence process was "going slowly" one trade publication reported, with only four of the potential 20 companies participating as of December 18.

MGM originally set January 15, 2010 as the deadline to receive bids from the companies interested in acquiring the studio. However, fewer bids than expected were made. Reliance Entertainment, which has a joint venture with DreamWorks Pictures, joined the bidding on the deadline date. News Corporation reportedly signed a non-disclosure agreement on or about January 15 and was considering a bid. On January 17, the New York Times reported that bids had been received from Time Warner, Lionsgate, and a few smaller companies but that most of the offers were below the $2 billion minimum. Some of the bids may have been below $1 billion, and nearly all the bids would require MGM to file for bankruptcy first and shed its debt obligations. But the Financial Times said sources believed most bids were within the $1.5 to $2 billion range. Barclays Capital, a British investment bank, was quoted as saying, "We find it unlikely that MGM's creditors would cleanly agree to a sale price materially below $2bn." Time Warner, one media source reported, was seen by industry observers as the leading bidder since it already owned much of the MGM library and had large cash reserves. Qualia Capital, previously thought to be a potential bidder, had suggested that MGM's creditors could have avoided forcing the studio into bankruptcy by agreeing to transform $500 million of debt into company stock (which would provide MGM with a cash infusion as well as eliminate a substantial portion of debt). By January 23, bids from Relativity Media (about $1.6 billion) and Reliance Entertainment (about $1.8 billion) were received as well. Six days later, MGM extended its deadline to March 31, and by the next day, News Corporation suggested that the company should offer MGM some cash to keep the company running.

MGM stated in February 2010 that the studio would likely be sold in the next four months and that Hot Tub Time Machine might be one of the last four films to bear the MGM name. However, some stated that the company might continue as a label for new James Bond productions, as well as other movie properties culled from the MGM library. A few weeks later, MGM set March 19 as a deadline to receive bids from companies interested in acquiring the studio, including Time Warner and Lionsgate, although Time Warner was considered the most likely to buy the studio since its Warner Bros. catalog already included all the pre-May 1986 MGM titles originally acquired by Ted Turner.

Eventually, MGM filed for Chapter 11 bankruptcy on November 3, 2010 and emerged on December 2 when the Federal Bankruptcy Court approved MGM's reorganization plan, which led to MGM's creditors taking over the company. On December 17, the company laid off about 50 staff members.

=== Creditor group ownership ===
Following the emergence from bankruptcy, MGM's secured lenders, which include Credit Suisse and JPMorgan Chase, jointly owned MGM Holdings Inc, which in turn owns the Hollywood studio Metro-Goldwyn-Mayer Inc. In December 2010, MGM named Spyglass partners Gary Barber and Roger Birnbaum as the co-Chairs and co-CEOs of the studio; and also appointed Ann Mather, the ex-Pixar CFO to head MGM's new board of directors. On December 29, 2010, MGM signed a new lease with New York-based group George Comfort & Sons for a 6-story building in the corner of 235–269 N. Beverly, leaving its old headquarters in Century City.

A late 2011 financial report revealed that MGM had acquired Tom Cruise's 30% stake in United Artists and once again owned 100% of UA.

In May 2012, MGM sold its minority non-voting shares of LAPTV to Fox International Channels while signing a long-term contract for content with LAPTV. On July 31, MGM announced a deal with Carl Icahn, MGM's largest shareholder, to acquire his stake in MGM Holdings for US$590 million. The deal allowed MGM to set a market value of US$2.4-US$3 billion for the studio, in case it went public or sold to a strategic investor. The same day, MGM sold MGM Networks, Inc. to Chellomedia, while retaining its US, Canada, UK, Germany and joint ventures in Brazil and Australia, to raise fund to buy out Carl Icahn and prepare for an IPO. Chellomedia (later acquired by AMC Networks and renamed AMC Networks International) has licensed the MGM brand and content to continue on the purchased MGM channels.

In September 2014, MGM acquired a 55% interest in One Three Media and Lightworkers Media, both operated by Hollywood producers Mark Burnett and Roma Downey. The two companies, along with UA, were consolidated into a new film and television company known as United Artists Media Group. On December 14, 2015, MGM announced that it had acquired the remaining 45% stake of UAMG it did not yet own. Downey and Burnett will receive stakes in MGM collectively valued at $233 million with Hearst receiving cash. Additionally, Burnett was promoted to CEO of MGM Television, replacing the outgoing Roma Khanna. The planned faith-based entertainment service will become a separate entity owned by MGM, Burnett, Downey, and Hearst.

In October 2017, MGM's board renewed Gary Barber's contract as chairman and CEO until December 2022. In February 2018, Chris Brearton, the former media M&A attorney of Latham and Watkins, was appointed as chief operating officer. On March 19, 2018, MGM Holdings announced that Barber had been fired by the studio's board of directors. MGM gave no reason for his firing. For the interim, the company would be led by the newly formed "Office of the CEO". The "Office of the CEO" is made up of divisional heads and senior executives. Later in April, MGM decided to use the rights to the 25th James Bond film as leverage for a possible sale of the studio, with Annapurna Pictures and Warner Bros. seen as potential bidders. On May 21, it is reported that Barber (who still owns 9% of MGM through stock options) is exploring a bid to acquire MGM and is speaking to investment banks about financing his offer. Instead, Barber sells his stock and options to MGM in June in a three-year stand-still on company-related matters.

In July 2018, MGM reset its debt capital structure to $2.5 billion which lowered the borrowing rate as MGM paid off the prior loan facility. This despite Moody's Investor Service reducing MGM on two key ratings because of increased TV spending and the departure of fiscally conservative Barber as CEO. Nancy Tellem, a director on the board since 2013, joined the company's Office of the CEO by February 7, 2019, with the title of executive director tasked with a long-term strategy. However, Tellem exited that position after six months in part due to clashes with Mark Burnett, TV group chairman. MGM's President of the Motion Picture Group, Jonathan Glickman, exited the company on February 1, 2020 with a first look deal starting with Aretha Franklin biographical picture Respect. Michael De Luca took charge as motion picture group chairman starting on March 1.

=== Sale to Amazon ===
In December 2020, MGM began to explore a potential sale of the studio, with the COVID-19 pandemic and the domination of streaming platforms due to the closure of movie theaters as contributing factors, hiring Morgan Stanley and LionTree Advisors to handle the process on behalf of the studio. On May 17, 2021, Amazon entered negotiations to acquire the studio. On May 26, 2021, Amazon announced their intent to acquire the studio for $8.45 billion, with the studio and its units/assets continuing operations under the new parent company. The merger was completed on March 17, 2022. Later that day, Amazon Studios and Amazon Prime Video senior vice president, Mike Hopkins, revealed that Amazon will continue to partner with United Artists Releasing (MGM and Annapurna's joint distribution venture), which will remain in operation to release all future MGM titles theatrically on a "case-by-case basis," while "all MGM employees will join my organization." It was also revealed that Amazon had no plans to make changes to the studio's production slate and release schedules nor make all MGM content exclusive to Prime Video, providing some hope that the studio would operate autonomously from Amazon Studios. These plans are expected to not impact the future of the James Bond franchise and its creative team. Two town hall meetings further detailing MGM's future post-merger took place on March 18, which included one for MGM employees and one for Amazon Studios/Prime Video employees. Both revealed the new interim reporting structure as part of Amazon's "phased integration plan," which would involve De Luca, Burnett and Brearton reporting to Hopkins on behalf of the studio. De Luca and Abdy announced their exits from the studio on April 27. On October 3, 2023, MGM Holdings was absorbed into Amazon Studios, which the latter's name changed to Amazon MGM Studios.

== Assets ==
MGM Holdings directly or indirectly owns and controls about 160 affiliates, with the most notable being the following group companies:

=== Final holdings ===
==== Film Production and Distribution ====
- Metro-Goldwyn-Mayer Studios Inc.
  - American International Pictures
  - Orion Pictures
    - Orion Classics

==== Television ====
- MGM Television
  - Big Fish Entertainment LLC
  - Evolution Media (Evolution Film & Tape, Inc.)
  - Gato Grande Productions (joint venture with Mexican entrepreneurs Miguel Aleman and Antonio Cué)
  - Orion TV Productions, Inc.
  - Lightworkers Media
- Channels
  - MGM+
    - MGM+ Marquee
    - MGM+ Hits
    - MGM+ Drive-In
    - MGM+ On Demand
  - ScreenPix
    - ScreenPix Action
    - ScreenPix Westerns
    - ScreenPix Voices
    - ScreenPix On Demand
- MGM Sci-Fi (Roku linear channel)

==== Other assets ====
- MGM Consumer Products
- MGM Music
- MGM Sports
- MGM On Stage

=== Former ===
- MGM Animation
- MGM Interactive
- MGM Networks
  - MGM Channel
- The Works
- LAPTV (Jointly owned by 20th Century Fox and Paramount Pictures)
  - Cinecanal
  - The Film Zone
  - Movie City
- Rainbow Media, now AMC Networks (20%)
- Carolco Pictures (15%)
- Comet (owned by Sinclair Broadcast Group)
- Charge! (owned by Sinclair Broadcast Group)
- This TV
- Light TV
- Impact (joint venture with Comcast)
- MGM Home Entertainment
- United Artists
- MGM Digital
  - Stargate Command – streaming service
  - United Artists
- United Artists Releasing (distribution joint venture with Annapurna Pictures)
- Rede Telecine (Brazilian joint venture with Canais Globo, The Walt Disney Company, Paramount Pictures and Universal Pictures)
  - Telecine Action
  - Telecine Cult
  - Telecine Fun
  - Telecine Pipoca
  - Telecine Premium
  - Telecine Touch
  - Telecine Productions
  - Telecine On Demand
  - Telecine Play

==== MGM HD ====

MGM HD was an all high-definition television cable network owned by the MGM HD Productions subsidiary of Metro-Goldwyn-Mayer (MGM), a division of Amazon's MGM Holdings, Inc. It launched in December 2006 and featured movies from the Metro-Goldwyn-Mayer library of 1,200 movies mastered in a high-definition-compatible format.[2] The films were usually presented uncut and in their original aspect ratio, although some films were edited for content for daytime viewing and commercial breaks were often added during peak viewing hours. MGM HD offered programming like the MGM Channel which was available in 110 countries.

On October 25, 2022 it was confirmed that Amazon would shut down MGM HD on October 31; its assets were merged onto sister service Epix, which re-branded as MGM+ on January 15, 2023.

== See also ==
- Major film studios
- MGM Records
