= Poker Superstars Invitational Tournament =

Series of televised poker tournaments

The Poker Superstars Invitational Tournament was a series of no limit Texas hold 'em poker tournaments. It was made for television and aired on Fox Sports Net in the United States, Rogers Sportsnet in Canada and Ftn in the United Kingdom.

== Results ==
Season	Year	Winner	Prize	Runner-Up	3rd place	Details
1	2004	(Denmark) Gus Hansen	$1,000,000	Johnny Chan	Phil Ivey	Results
2	2005	(United States) Johnny Chan	$400,000	Todd Brunson	Juan Carlos Mortensen	Results
3	2006	(United States) Todd Brunson	$400,000	Antonio Esfandiari	Johnny Chan	Results

== Crew ==
The first series was hosted by Chris Rose, with support from poker author Michael Konik and poker professional Mark Gregorich. Mark Gregorich left the show at the end of the first season.

The first series grand finale aired in February 2005 on the same day as Super Bowl XXXIX. Fox carried the Super Bowl that year, so instead of the series' usual home on FSN, NBC carried the finale instead. It was hosted by Matt Vasgersian, with support from poker professional Erick Lindgren. Backstage interviews were conducted by poker player Evelyn Ng.

The first series was executive produced by David Doyle and Directed by Brian Lockwood.

Howard "The Professor" Lederer replaced Michael Konik at the beginning of the 3rd season, with Annie Duke joining for several episodes as a "special guest". Mary Strong conducted the backstage interviews.

== Computer versions ==
There have been two computer games made of the first two seasons of the show.

- Poker Superstars Invitational Tournament
- Poker Superstars II
- Poker Superstars III
