= Intisar Abioto =

American artist

- Born: 1986 (age 39–40); Memphis, Tennessee
- Education: Spelman College; Wesleyan University
- Known for: Artist and storyteller

Intisar Abioto (born 1986) is an artist and storyteller currently living and working in Portland, Oregon. Working within and between the forms of dance, photography, collaboration, prose, and poetry, Abioto explores the meaning of time, space, and belonging within the construction of who, where, and what composes the African diaspora. Abioto has travelled across North America, Europe, and Africa to tell stories of personal identity and collective belonging. Her work interprets the tradition of Africans who can fly into contemporary and local landscapes, highlighting the fluidity of migration across national and natural boundaries. With the five women artists in her family, she is a cofounder of Studio Abioto.

== Early life and education ==
Born in Memphis, Tennessee, Abioto moved to Portland, Oregon as a young adult with her family. Herself and four sisters infused this new home base with the creativity intuitive to their home town community and upbringing. She completed undergraduate studies at Spelman College and Wesleyan University.

== Career ==
From 2007 to 2009 Abioto travelled 200,000 miles around the world with her sisters, documenting oral histories of about the stories and dreams of young people, especially people of color. This project was based on Virginia Hamilton's book The People Could Fly.

In 2013 Abioto started The Black Portlanders, a tumblr blog that has since expanded from the digital platform into gallery installations. Originally the project began as a way to expand the stories of who belongs in Portland, while honoring the multiple displacements that have disproportionally affected African Americans in Portland from Vanport to contemporary urban reinvestment strategies. By capturing the full spectrum of identity and belonging within the urban landscape of Portland, the project offers a counter-narrative to press branding Portland as "the whitest city in America."

Herself a member of the African Diaspora, The Black Portlanders uses photography to tell stories of transnational migration of African peoples to Portland from a perspective that is at once personal and transcendent. In 2015, Abioto expanded the project to include rural experiences by partnering with the National Urban League Portland chapter to illustrate a reissue of the State of Black Oregon, a report documenting economic inequities faced by African American communities across the state with an emphasis on resulting migration shifts. This social justice tool kit was enhanced by Abioto's creative vision, which honors the history of migration from the Southern United States to the Pacific Northwest. The project includes multiple images of each person she photographs, allowing the complexity of each person's natural expressions to unfold from the lenses of camera, the artist's eye, and the viewer's retina.

Abioto lead an, ultimately unsuccessful, effort to purchase the home of Oregon civil rights activist Beatrice Morrow Cannady in 2022.

== Exhibitions ==
Abioto's work has been featured in galleries internationally such as Portland Art Museum, Portland State University's Littman Gallery, and University of Oregon's defunct Portland-based gallery White Box. In 2019, she exhibited and performed with nine Oregon-based Black artists against the inner expanse of the Oregon State Capitol building in Salem as a part of the Governor's Office solo exhibition.

== Awards and honors ==
- 2018: Oregon Humanities Emerging Journalists, Community Stories Fellowship
- 2019: Women of Excellence in the Arts Award from the Portland Alumnae Chapter of Delta Sigma Theta sorority
- 2020: Lilla Jewel Award for Womxn Artists from the Seeding Justice Foundation
