= America: A Personal History of the United States =

British television documentary series (1972–1973)

- Genre: Documentary
- Written by: Alistair Cooke
- Presented by: Alistair Cooke
- No. of episodes: 13

Production
- Producer: Michael Gill
- Production companies: BBC; Time-Life Films

Original release
- Network: BBC2
- Release: 12 November 1972 – 4 February 1973

America: A Personal History of the United States is a British 13-part documentary television series about the United States and its history, commissioned by the BBC and made in partnership with Time-Life Films. It was written and presented by Alistair Cooke, and first broadcast in both the United Kingdom and the United States in 1972. The producer was Michael Gill, who had the idea for the series and chose the presenter. A related book, Alistair Cooke's America, sold almost two million copies.

The series was a great success in both countries and was nominated for a Golden Globe Award and a BAFTA. It also resulted in Cooke's invitation to address the joint Houses of the United States Congress as part of the Bicentennial celebrations. Cooke said that, of all his work, America was what he was most proud of; it is the result and expression of his long love for the country. (Once, asked how long it took him to make the series, Cooke replied "I do not want to be coy, but it took 40 years.") He worked with Sir Denis William Brogan.

== Episodes ==
No.	Title	Original release date
1	"The First Impact"	12 November 1972
A memoir of Cooke's infatuation with the United States, through early contacts as a child and as a visiting fellow after university, and its effect on his life.
2	"The New Found Land"	19 November 1972
Follows the lives, settlements, and influence of the Spanish in the west and the French in the east.
3	"Home from Home"	26 November 1972
Relates the settlement of America by English dissenters and adventurers in the 16th and 17th centuries, from the Jamestown Settlement to the Pilgrim Fathers.
4	"Making a Revolution"	3 December 1972
Looks at the American Revolutionary War, the military struggle to break free of British control.
5	"Inventing a Nation"	10 December 1972
Chronicles the forging of the federal government through the United States Constitution and the Bill of Rights, and the great debate between the national and individual state governments.
6	"Gone West"	17 December 1972
About the pioneers, from Daniel Boone to the "Forty-Niners"; expansion through the Louisiana Purchase; and the dispossession of Native Americans.
7	"A Firebell in the Night"	24 December 1972
Tells of slavery and life in the Southern states and of the events, causes, and effects of the American Civil War.
8	"Domesticating a Wilderness"	31 December 1972
Deals with the great push westward by the settlers, including the Latter-day Saints; the crossing of the continent by railroad; the myth of the cowboy; the domestication of the land by settlers local and foreign; and the final conquest of the Native Americans after much warfare.
9	"Money on the Land"	7 January 1973
Addresses the rise and effects of business and machines, touching Chicago, the reaper, Thomas Edison, oil, John D. Rockefeller and Andrew Carnegie, and the moneyed classes.
10	"The Huddled Masses"	14 January 1973
Covers the rise and influence of mass immigration in the 19th and 20th centuries, and the current "melting pot".
11	"The Promise Fulfilled and the Promise Broken"	21 January 1973
Surveys life, prosperity, and politics in the 1920s, leading to the Great Depression and the New Deal.
12	"The Arsenal"	28 January 1973
Examines the rise of the reluctant United States to world military power, the growth of the United Nations, and the United States as a nuclear power.
13	"The More Abundant Life"	4 February 1973
Concludes the series by looking at contemporary America in the 1960s and early 1970s, and how it had diverged from the original aims of the settlers, and its hope for the future.
