= List of programs broadcast by Telemundo =

This is a list of television programs currently broadcast (in first-run or reruns), scheduled to be broadcast or formerly broadcast on Telemundo, a Spanish-language American broadcast television network, owned by NBCUniversal, which in turn is a wholly owned subsidiary of Comcast.

== Current programming ==
=== Drama ===
- Sin senos sí hay paraíso (July 19, 2016)

Acquired

- Lejos de ti (October 20, 2025)

=== Reality/non-scripted ===
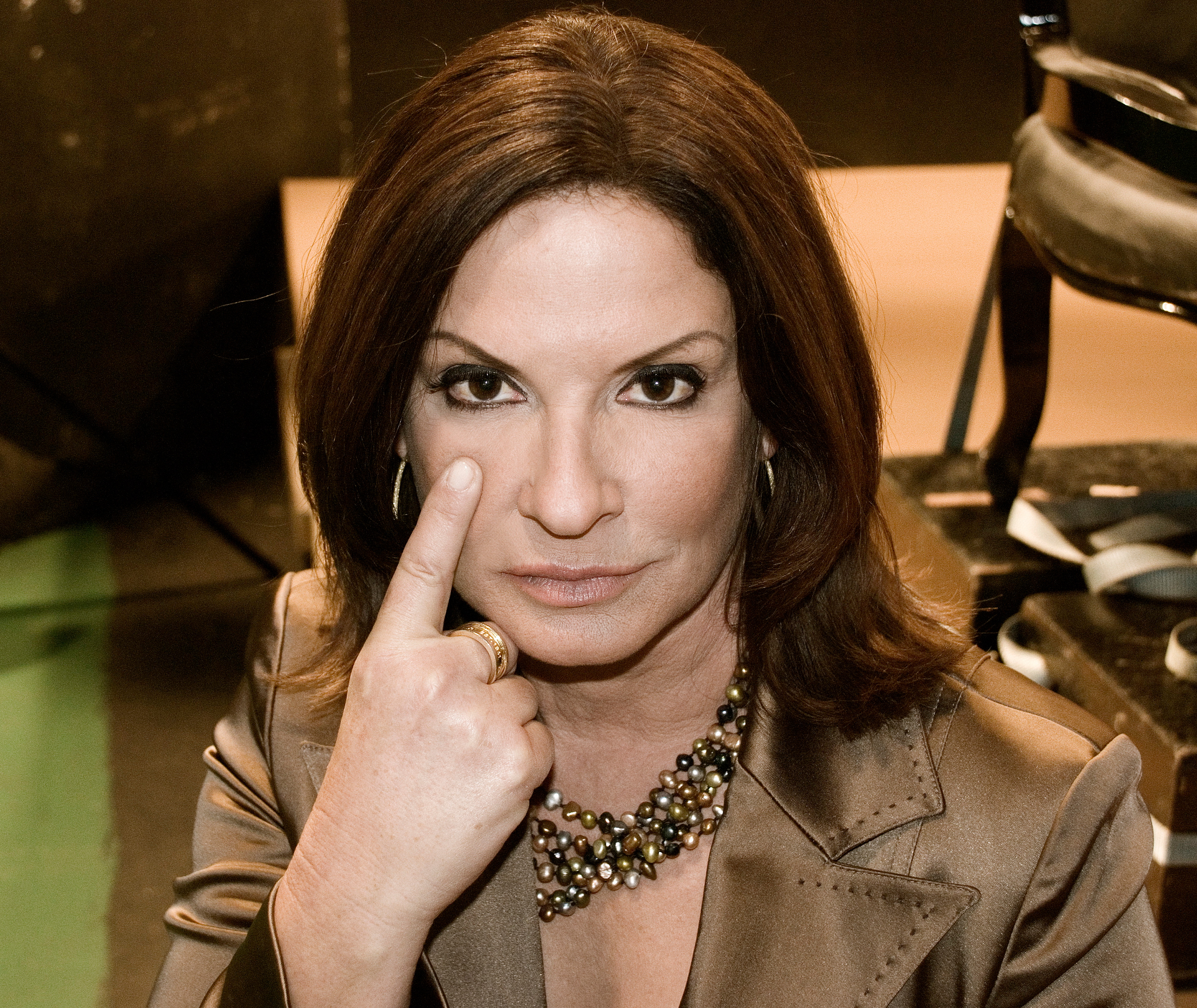
Ana María Polo, presenter of the popular TV show Caso Cerrado

- Caso Cerrado (2001) (Note: Rerun)
- Exatlón Estados Unidos (July 16, 2018)
- La casa de los famosos (August 24, 2021)
- Top Chef VIP (August 9, 2022)
- La isla: desafío extremo (July 30, 2024)
- Operación Triunfo (July 7, 2026)
- Juego de villanos (October 20, 2026)

=== Awards shows ===
- Billboard Latin Music Awards (1999)

=== News ===
- Noticias Telemundo (1999)
- Al Rojo Vivo (2002)
- Noticias Telemundo Mediodia (2018)
- Noticias Telemundo en la Noche (2020)
- Hoy Día (2021)
- Dateline (February 15, 2025)
- Noticias Telemundo Ahora (August 4, 2025)

=== Talk shows ===
- Acceso Total (2010)
- En casa con Telemundo (April 2, 2020)
- La mesa caliente (March 7, 2022)
- Acércate a Rocío (January 2, 2023)
- Pica y se extiende (January 21, 2024)

=== Sports ===
- Liga MX
  - Chivas Guadalajara home matches (2020)
  - FC Juárez home matches (2025)
  - Tigres UANL home matches (2025)
- Juegos Olímpicos por Telemundo (2004)
- Fútbol de Premier League (2013)
- NBC Sunday Night Football (2014)
- FIFA U-17 World Cup (2015)
- FIFA U-20 World Cup (2015)
- FIFA World Cup (2018)
- El pelotazo (March 10, 2025)
- NBA en Telemundo (2026)
- Serie A (2026)
- Bundesliga (2026)

=== Saturday morning ===
- El viajero con Josh García (2018)
- Salvando animales (2018)
- Aventuras con Dylan Dreyer (2018)
- Vivir al natural, Danny Seo (2018)
- Una mano amiga (2018)
- El campeón en ti (2018)

=== Specials ===
- Viva México: El Grito! (2000)
- Macy's Thanksgiving Day Parade (2003–2006, 2016–2017, 2020)
- Virgen de Guadalupe (2000)
- Bienvenido (2016–2018, 2022–present)
- Miss Universo (2003-2014, 2019–present)

== Upcoming programming ==
- Leyla (December 1, 2026)
- UEFA club competitions (August 2027, includes Champions League, Europa League, Conference League and Super Cup)

== Former programming ==
=== Original programming ===
==== Reality/non-scripted ====
- Así se baila (2021)
- Caso Cerrado: Edición Estelar (2010–2019)
- La Voz (2019–2020)
- Los 50 (2023–2024)
- MasterChef Latino (2018–2019)
- Miss Universe Latina, el reality (2025)
- Pase a la fama (2025)
- Por amor o por dinero (2021–2022)

==== Talk shows ====
- A Oscuras Pero Encendidos (1995–2001)
- Cotorreando (2000-2007)
- Don Francisco te invita (2016–2018)
- El Colador (2021)
- Él y ella (1995–2001)
- La Corte del Pueblo (2000–2005)
- La Corte de Familia (2000–2005)
- No Te Duermas (1990–2008)
- Sevcec (1994–1999)
- Suelta La Sopa (2013–2021)

==== Comedy ====
- Los Beltrán (1999–2001)

==== Awards shows ====
- Latin American Music Award (2015–2022)
- Premios Tu Música Urbano (2022)
- Your World Awards (2012–2017)

==== News ====
- Ocurrió Así (1990–2002)
- Enfoque (2010-2018)

==== Game shows ====
- Minuto para ganar (2020)
- ¿Qué dicen los famosos? (2022–2023)
- Vas o No Vas (2006–2007)
- The Wall (2020)

=== Acquired programming ===
==== Drama series ====
- 5 viudas sueltas (2013)
- América (2009–2010)
- Amor cautivo (2012–2013)
- Amor en silencio (1988)
- Amor imposible (2023–2024)
- Amor Mío (2006–2007)
- Amor y traición (2022–2023)
- Amor valiente (2022)
- Anónima (2019)
- Avenida Brasil (2014; 2015)
- Azul Tequila (1999)
- Bahar: Esencia de mujer (2025)
- Café con aroma de mujer (2021)
- Catalina y Sebastián (1999–2000)
- Celebridad (2005–2006)
- Cennet (2020; 2022)
- El beso del vampiro (2003)
- El Cartel (2008–2010)
- El clavel y la rosa (2003–2004)
- El Clone (2002)
- El color del pecado (2004–2005)
- Él es mi hijo (2022)
- El fuego del destino (2022)
- El Secretario (2012–2013)
- El Turco (2026)
- Eres mi luz (2026)
- Hasta que la plata nos separe (2022)
- Hasta que te conocí (2016; 2017–2018)
- Hercai, amor y venganza (2021–2022)
- Identidad oculta (2019)
- Infiel, historia de un engaño (2022)
- La Caponera (2002)
- La Esclava Isaura (2007)
- La familia (2024–2025)
- La fuerza del deseo (2001–2002)
- La ley del corazón (2020)
- La prepago (2014)
- La presencia de Anita (2003–2004)
- La sultana (2018–2019; 2020–2021)
- Lazos de familia (2003)
- Llovizna (1997–1998)
- María Bonita (1995)
- Me robaste el corazón (2025)
- Mi gorda bella (2010–2011)
- Mujeres ambiciosas (2017; 2018)
- Mujeres apasionadas (2004)
- Pablo Escobar, el Patrón del Mal (2012, 2014)
- Pasiones secretas (1995–1996)
- Pobre Diabla (1990–1991)
- Poder y traición (2026)
- Rafael Orozco, el ídolo (2013)
- Reglas del juego (2017–2018)
- Señora del destino (2005)
- Siete mujeres (2005)
- Sin tetas no hay paraíso (2010)
- Sobreviviendo a Escobar, Alias JJ (2020)
- Terra Esperanza (2002–2003)
- Terra Nostra (2000–2001)
- Todo por mi hija (2020–2021)
- Uga-Uga (2001–2002)
- Un poquito tuyo (2019)
- Una casa para Azul (2021)
- Vecinos (2011)
- Xica da Silva (2000)
- Secretos de sangre (2023)
- Yo soy Betty, la fea (2000–2001; 2020–2021)

==== Reality shows ====
- American Ninja Warrior (2020)
- Vídeos asombrosos (2008–2010s)
- Shockwave (2018)

==== Sports ====
- Copa FIFA Confederaciones (2017)
- Copa Mundial Femenina de la FIFA (2015–2023)
- Hockey Telemundo (2015)
- WWE Raw (2005)

==== Children's programming ====
- ¡Aaahh! Monstruos de Verdad (September 19, 1998–September 9, 2000)
- Hey Arnold! (September 19, 1998–September 9, 2000; September 18, 2004–January 2005)
- Las Pistas de Blue (September 19, 1998–September 9, 2000)
- La Vida Mordena de Rocko (September 19, 1998–September 9, 2000)
- Rugrats (September 19, 1998–September 9, 2000; September 18, 2004–September 2, 2006)
- Jumanji (September 19, 1998–September 9, 2000)
- Dora La Exploradora (September 18, 2004–September 2, 2006)
- Rugrats Crecidos (September 18, 2004–September 2, 2006)
- 3-2-1 Penguins! (September 9, 2006–September 13, 2009; January 2, 2010–October 2, 2010)
- Babar (September 10, 2006–September 30, 2007; July 5, 2008–June 30, 2012)
- Jacob Two-Two
  - During its run on the Telemundo Kids block: (January 2005-September 2, 2006)
  - During its run on the Qubo block: (September 10, 2006–September 30, 2007; September 19, 2009–October 11, 2009)
- Jane and the Dragon (September 10, 2006–March 28, 2009; September 19, 2009–October 3, 2010; January 7, 2012–June 30, 2012)
- Larryboy Adventures (September 9, 2006–September 29, 2007)
- Little Robots (September 3, 2011–July 1, 2012)
- The Magic School Bus (October 9, 2010–December 31, 2011)
- My Friend Rabbit (October 6, 2007–December 27, 2009)
- Pearlie (October 10, 2010–July 1, 2012)
- Shelldon (October 17, 2009–July 1, 2012)
- Turbo Dogs (October 4, 2008–September 12, 2009; January 2, 2010–December 31, 2011)
- VeggieTales (September 9, 2006–September 13, 2009)
- Willa's Wild Life (September 20, 2009–July 1, 2012)
- The Zula Patrol (July 5, 2008–October 10, 2009; January 7, 2012–June 30, 2012)
- Dragon (September 9, 2006–June 29, 2008)
- Mascotas Maravilla
- Jay Jay the Jet Plane (July 7, 2012–December 8, 2013; April 5, 2014–June 29, 2014)
- LazyTown (July 7, 2012–September 24, 2016)
- Raggs (July 7, 2012–September 24, 2016)
- Noodle and Doodle (July 8, 2012– December 30, 2017)
- The Chica Show (July 6, 2014–2017)
- Nina's World (2016–2017)
- Go Diego Go
- Maya the Bee (2017)
- Dragon Tales (September 13, 2003–September 11, 2004)
- Nubeluz (September 15, 1990–September 14, 1996)
- Jackie Chan Adventures (September 13, 2003–September 11, 2004)
- Las Tres Mellizas (September 13, 2003–September 11, 2004)
- Dragon Ball Z (September 19, 1998–September 9, 2000; September 13, 2003–September 11, 2004)
- Monster by Mistake (September 18, 2004–September 10, 2005)

=== Programming blocks ===
- Telemundo Infantil (1995-1998)
- Nickelodeon en Telemundo (1998-2001)
- Telemundo Kids (2001-2006)
- Qubo (2006-2012)
- Mi Telemundo (2012–present)
