= MGM/UA =

MGM/UA may refer to:

- Metro-Goldwyn-Mayer, American film and television production and distribution company
  - United Artists, American film and television studio, now a subsidiary of Amazon MGM Studios
- MGM/UA Home Entertainment, the home video arm of Metro-Goldwyn-Mayer
- MGM/UA Television, American television production/distribution studio
