= Al Youm =

Al Youm is a three-hour prime time news magazine that airs 'commercial free' five days a week on the Alhurra network, a United States–based public Arabic-language satellite TV channel.

== Information ==
The show Airs simultaneously from five sets on three continents. It is generated life each day from Dubai, Beirut, Jerusalem, Cairo and Virginia. According to the March issue of 'Emirates Business 24-7', recent surveys of the Middle East done by companies like ACNielsen place Alhurra's viewership at 26-million adults a week. Its format has been described as 'a really big show', 'unusual', the first of its kind to air in the Middle East, According to Broadcasting Board of Governors Joaquin Blaya and executive producer Fran Mires. The show is hosted by Egyptian TV Presenter, Bassel Sabri.
