= MGM (TV channel) =

Former global television channel

MGM Channel
- Broadcast area: Worldwide

Programming
- Picture format: 4:3 (576i, SDTV)

Ownership
- Owner: AMC Networks International
- Sister channels: MGM HD

History
- Launched: 1 January 1999; 27 years ago 18 September 2005; 21 years ago (Russia)
- Closed: 5 November 2014 (Hungary); 1 January 2015 (Asia); 25 May 2015 (Russia); 1 August 2015 (India); 30 September 2016 (Israel)
- Replaced by: AMC

Links
- Website: mgmchannel.de

MGM Channel was a global-based television network that was launched in 1999 by Metro-Goldwyn-Mayer Studios that aired movies from MGM's library, including Babies in toyland,West Side Story,2001: A Space Odyssey, Midnight Cowboy, The Terminator, Moonstruck, The Manchurian Candidate, The Black Stallion, Blown Away,Rain Man, and Stargate among many others. The network had access to the Metro-Goldwyn-Mayer library of films, comprising approximately 4,000 titles, and over 10,400 episodes of television programming.

Following AMC Networks' acquisition of Chellomedia, it was announced on 4 August 2014 that MGM Channel would be rebranded as AMC in late 2014. On 5 November 2014, MGM was replaced by AMC in Hungary.

As of 2015, MGM Channel has been indirectly found out to have continued airing in Ireland, Austria, Switzerland, Germany, Iceland and some other countries.

On 1 January 2015, the Asian version of AMC was launched, replacing MGM in Asia and also in Sri Lanka for the first time it received AMC.

== MGM HD ==
MGM HD was a high definition version of the channel.

== See also ==
- MGM Networks
- MGM HD
