= MGM Networks =

Defunct subsidiary of AMC Networks International

MGM Networks, Inc.
- Type: Subsidiary
- Industry: Television
- Founded: 1996; 30 years ago
- Defunct: 2014; 12 years ago
- Fate: Rebranded to AMC
- Successor: AMC
- Parent: AMC Networks International (AMC Networks)

MGM Networks was a subsidiary of AMC Networks International. They held AMC Networks International's interests in the MGM branded cable television, satellite television, other television channels and services that reached nearly 120 countries and territories.

These included the film-driven MGM Channel, the Casa Club home and lifestyle channel which targets viewers in Latin America and several Pay TV movie networks run in conjunction with other motion picture studios, in Latin America, and Japan.

== History ==
In 1998, Liberty Media and MGM formed a 50/50 ownership in MGM Latin America.

On April 21, 2008, after negotiations between Paramount Pictures, MGM and Lionsgate with Showtime on new film output deals broke down, the trio of production companies formed a joint venture, Studio 3 Partners, to start a new premium movie channel, Epix. MGM and Weigel Broadcasting announced the formation of This TV on July 28, 2008, with a planned launch that autumn. The network had a formal on-air launch date of November 1, 2008, The Epix television service officially launched on October 30, 2009

In 2011, MGM was attached to a new multicast African-American focused network called, KIN TV, in conjunction with Lee Gaither, a former TV One founding executive, and his Basil Street Media, a production and consulting company. MGM role wasn't defined, as TV News Check indicated just of MGM of "shopping" and distributing the network while Radio & Television Business Report indicated KIN TV as a joint venture between the two companies. KIN was original planned to be launched in Summer 2011. Some of Fox MyNetworkTV O&O TV Stations, including WWOR and KCOP, were slated as of December 6, 2011 by Fox to air KIN TV when launched. By December 2012, KIN TV missed multiple launched dates and Gaither left KIN TV to be named the Africa Channel executive vice president and general manager thus calling the network into question.

In May 2012, MGM sold its minority non-voting shares of LAPTV to Fox International Channels while signing a long-term contract for content with LAPTV. On July 31, 2012, MGM sold MGM Networks to Chellomedia, while retaining their television channels in the United States, Canada (North America), the United Kingdom and Germany as well as their joint venture territories in Brazil and Australia, to raise fund to buy out Carl Icahn and prepare for an IPO. Since then, Chellomedia had licensed the MGM brand and content to continue on the purchased MGM channels.

In 2014, AMC Networks purchased then renamed Chellomedia as AMC Networks International, as part of their entry into international broadcasting. As a result, in November 2014, AMC Networks International started to rename their European and Latin American MGM channels under the name AMC. Also, at the end of 2014, they also renamed their Asian MGM channel AMC, and on either June 30, 2015 or July 1, 2015, renamed Casa Club TV (which they had acquired from MGM earlier) Más Chic.

== Units ==
- Channels in:
  - United States
  - Spain
  - Turkey
  - Israel
  - Benelux
  - Poland
  - India
  - South East Asia
- EMEA Channel
- Central Europe
- MGM EIN'S (joint venture between MGM Networks and EIN'S M&M (formerly TAEWON Entertainment); Formerly MGM Spectrum and MGM TAEWON)
  - MGM Korea
  - M2
- MGM Latin America
  - MGM Channel
  - Casa Club TV
  - Ella

== Former units ==
Former subsidiaries

- LAPTV (joint venture with 20th Century Fox and Paramount Pictures)
  - Cinecanal
  - The Film Zone
  - Movie City

retained by MGM

- MGM HD
- Studio 3 Partners
  - Epix
- This TV
- MGM Channels
  - Canada
  - UK
  - Germany
- joint ventures
  - Australia
  - Telecine (Brazil; joint venture with Globosat, 20th Century Fox, Paramount Pictures and Universal Pictures)

== See also ==
MGM (TV channel)
