= Alpha (disambiguation) =

Alpha (Α or α) is the first letter of the Greek alphabet.

Alpha or ALPHA may also refer to:

== Letters ==
- Latin alpha (ɑ), a letter of the Latin alphabet
- ɑ, a glyph in the International Phonetic Alphabet
- ɑ, a vowel in the General Alphabet of Cameroon Languages
- Alfa, the first letter in the NATO phonetic alphabet

== Art and entertainment ==
=== Books and comics ===
- Alpha (Lombard), a Franco-Belgian comics series
- The Alphas, a young-adult novel series by Lisi Harrison
- Alpha 1 through Alpha 9, anthologies edited by Robert Silverberg

=== Film and television ===
- Alpha (2018 film), an American prehistoric adventure film
- Alpha (2019 film), a Bangladeshi film
- Alpha (2025 film), a French horror film
- Alpha (2026 film), an Indian film of the YRF Spy Universe
- Alpha., a 2024 Dutch adventure film
- Alpha Alpha, a German science fantasy series
- Alphas, an American science fiction TV series 2011–2012
- "Alpha" (The X-Files), a sixth-season episode of The X-Files
- Alpha and Omega (radio plays)
- Alpha TV, a Greek television channel

=== Fictional characters and places ===
- Alpha (DC Comics), a character from DC Comics
- Alpha (Marvel Comics), a character from Marvel Comics
- Alpha (The Walking Dead), an antagonist from the Walking Dead comic and TV series
- Alpha 4 (Power Rangers), Alpha 5 (Power Rangers), Alpha 6 (Power Rangers), or Alpha 7 (Power Rangers), characters in the Power Rangers universe
- Alpha the Ultimate Mutant, a character in Marvel Comics
- Moonbase Alpha (Space: 1999), the primary setting for the television series Space: 1999
- Alpha, a wolf character in the animated film Storks
- Alpha, the lead dog from the 2009 animated film Up
- Alpha Trion, an autobot character in The Transformers
- Alpha, a fictional computer in Mike Walker's radio play Alpha
- Alpha (アルファ), the first member of Shadow Garden and leader of the Seven Shadows in the light novel and anime series The Eminence in Shadow
- Alpha, the main antagonist of Xenoblade Chronicles 3: Future Redeemed
- Alpha, an organization in the YRF Spy Universe
- Alpha, a humanised Dalek from The Evil of the Daleks

=== Gaming ===
- Alpha (Magic: The Gathering), a card set
- Alpha (video game), released in 1986

=== Internet properties ===
- Airlock Alpha, a science fiction website primarily dedicated to Star Trek

=== Music ===
==== Albums ====
- Alpha (Aitana album) (2023)
- Alpha (Alice Nine album) (2007)
- Alpha (Asia album) (1983)
- Alpha (Charlotte Day Wilson album) (2021)
- Alpha (CL album) (2021)
- Alpha (Jelena Karleuša album) (2023)
- Alpha (Selena y Los Dinos album) (1986)
- Alpha (Sevendust album) (2007)
- Alpha (Shenseea album) (2022)
- Alpha (War of Ages album) (2017)

==== Songs ====
- "Alpha" (song), 2014, by Kollegah
- "Alpha", a track on the 1976 album Albedo 0.39 by Vangelis
- "Alpha", by C418 from the 2013 soundtrack Minecraft – Volume Beta

==== Other uses in music ====
- Alpha, a French early music label record label, now part of Outhere
- Alpha chord, in the octatonic scale
- Alpha (band), a British electronic music group

== Business ==
- Alpha Bank, a Greek bank, or their stock symbol ALPHA
- Alpha Books, an imprint of Penguin Group
- Alpha Industries, an American clothing company
- Alpha Media, an American radio broadcasting company
- Alpha (shipping company), a Norwegian shipping and ferry operator
- Alpha TV, a Greek terrestrial channel
- Alpha Video, an American entertainment company
- Alpha, a streaming service operated by Legendary Entertainment from 2016 to 2019
- Alpha (Australian magazine), an Australian men's sport magazine
- Alpha, an investor magazine, later incorporated into Absolute Return + Alpha

== People ==
- Alpha (given name), a list of people with the name
- Elizabeth Alpha-Lavalie (1947–2013), Sierra Leonian politician
- Jenny Alpha (1910–2010), Martinique-born French actress and singer

== Places ==
=== United States of America ===
- Alpha, California, former settlement
- Alpha, Illinois, a village
- Alpha, Iowa, an unincorporated community
- Alpha, Kentucky, an unincorporated community
- Alpha, Maryland, an unincorporated community
- Alpha, Michigan, a village
- Alpha, Minnesota, a city
- Alpha, Missouri, an unincorporated community
- Alpha, New Jersey, a borough
- Alpha, Ohio, a neighborhood of the city of Beavercreek
- Alpha, Oregon, an unincorporated community
- Alpha (Morristown, Tennessee), a neighborhood
- Alpha, Texas, an unincorporated freedman's town
- Alpha, Virginia, an unincorporated community
- Alpha, Washington, an unincorporated community
- Alpha, Wisconsin, an unincorporated community
- Alpha Ridge, Alaska, a mountain ridge

=== Elsewhere ===
- Alpha, Queensland, a town in Australia
- Alpha Ridge, an undersea ridge in the Arctic Ocean

== Science, technology and mathematics ==
=== Biology ===
- Alpha (ethology) (also "alpha male" and "alpha female"), the highest ranking individuals in a community of social animals
- Alpha helixes, a type of secondary protein structures
- α receptors, a type of Adrenergic receptor
- SARS-CoV-2 Alpha variant, one of the variants of SARS-CoV-2, the virus that causes COVID-19
- A class of Immunoglobulin heavy chains that defines IgA type antibodies
- Trinchesia alpha, a species of sea slug

=== Computing ===
- Alpha (programming language), an early database language
- Alpha compositing, an image processing technique
- Alpha phase of a software release life cycle
- AlphaServer, DEC now HP machine successor to the VAX
- AlphaStation, DEC now HP workstation successor to the VAX
- DEC Alpha, an instruction set architecture developed by Digital Equipment Corporation (DEC)
- Wolfram Alpha, a computational knowledge engine

=== Mathematics and statistics ===
- Alpha (finance), a measurement of active return on an investment
- Cronbach's alpha, a statistical measure of reliability
- Angular eccentricity (conventional symbol "α")
- Navigational azimuth (symbol "α")
- One of the Feigenbaum constants describing a bifurcation diagram, in mathematics (symbol "α")
- The probability of a type I error in statistics (symbol "α")
- The significance level of a statistical test (symbol "α")
- The inverse Ackermann function
- α, sometimes used as a placeholder for ordinal numbers

=== Science ===
- ALPHA, a particle physics experiment at CERN
- ALPHA Collaboration, (Antihydrogen Laser PHysics Apparatus), a team of scientists
- Alpha particle, form of particle radiation
- Alpha waves, recorded by electroencephalography
- Angle of attack in aerodynamics (symbol "α")
- Angular acceleration in physics (symbol "α")
- Coefficient of thermal expansion in thermodynamics (symbol "α")
- Fine-structure constant in physics (symbol "α")
- Thermal diffusivity in thermodynamics (symbol "α")
- Common-base current gain of a transistor in electronics (symbol "α")
- α, the isotope fractionation factor between two substances in geochemistry
- Alpha, the brightest star in a constellation according to the Bayer designation

=== Technology ===
- Alpha (navigation), a Russian radio navigation system
- Alpha, a drone manufactured by Flock Safety
- Alpha mode, propeller settings used for flight in airplanes with turboprop engines
- Minolta Alpha, the Japanese name for a series of SLR cameras known as Maxxum or Dynax elsewhere
- Sony α or Sony Alpha, a digital SLR series by Sony, direct successor to the Minolta Alpha series
- Samsung Galaxy Alpha, 2014 Android smartphone by Samsung

== Transportation ==
- GM Alpha platform, the underpinning of various GM vehicles
- Alpha (sternwheeler), a 19th-century river vessel
- Alpha 2000, a light aircraft built in New Zealand
- Dassault/Dornier Alpha Jet, a French/German jet trainer aircraft
- Firefly Alpha, an orbital rocket
- Kohler Alpha, an American glider
- Pipistrel Alpha Trainer, a Slovenian light-sport aircraft
- SS Alpha (1891), a Greek cargo ship in service 1924–30

== Tropical and subtropical cyclones ==
- Subtropical Storm Alpha (1972), first storm of the 1972 Atlantic hurricane season
- Tropical Storm Alpha (2005), twenty-third storm of the 2005 Atlantic hurricane season
- Subtropical Storm Alpha (2020), twenty-second storm of the 2020 Atlantic hurricane season

== Other uses ==
- ALPHA (drug), a psychoactive drug
- Generation Alpha, the demographic cohort succeeding Generation Z
- Alpha course, an introductory course in Christianity
- Alpha Group, a Russian counterterrorism unit
- Alpha Secondary School, a high school in Burnaby, British Columbia, Canada
- Alpha Boys School, a school in Kingston, Jamaica
- Alpha, or Service "A", one of the uniforms of the United States Marine Corps

== See also ==
- Alpha and Omega (disambiguation)
- Alpha value (disambiguation)
- Alfa (disambiguation)
- Moonbase Alpha (disambiguation)
- A, the letter
- Space Station Alpha
- Space Complex Alpha
- Beginning (disambiguation)
- Birth (disambiguation)
- Construction (disambiguation)
