= Alfa =

Alfa may refer to:

== Businesses and organisations ==
=== Broadcasting ===
- Alfa Radio, a Macedonian radio station
- XHFAJ-FM, a Mexico City radio station better known as Alfa 91.3
- Alfa TV (Cypriot TV channel), a premium television service available in Cyprus
- Alfa TV (North Macedonia)
- Alfa TVP, a Polish children's television channel

=== Industrial ===
- ALFA (Mexico), a Mexican industrial conglomerate
- Alfa Aesar, a chemical supply company

=== Science and technology ===
- Alfa (Lebanon), a Lebanese telecom company
- Alfa Financial Software, a British software company
- Alfa Romeo, an Italian luxury automobile manufacturer founded as A.L.F.A.
- ALFA (XACML), a domain-specific language used in the formulation of fine-grained authorization access control policies

=== Other businesses ===
- Alfa (cigarette), an Italian brand
- Alfa Brewery, a Dutch brewery
- Alfa Group Consortium, a Russian privately owned investment group
  - Alfa-Bank, the Alfa Group corporate treasury
- Alfamart, an Indonesian retail company
- Alfa Records, a Japanese record label
- Alfa Co., a subsidiary of the Al Faisaliah Group

== People ==
- Alfa (singer), an Italian singer and rapper
- Isaac Alfa, a retired Nigerian Air Force officer
- El Alfa, a Dominican recording artist

== Other uses ==
- Alfa, code word for the letter A in the ICAO/NATO phonetic alphabet, the International Code of Signals and related spelling alphabets
- Alfa class submarine, NATO name for Soviet Union/Russian Navy Project 705 submarines
- Alfa (rocket), a 1970s Italian ballistic missile
- ALFA (band), a boy band in Myanmar
- ALFA (rowing), an international indoor rowing competition in Estonia
- Alfa (title), a title given to distinguished figures in Guinea
- Subtropical Storm Alfa, the first subtropical storm of the 1973 Atlantic hurricane season
- We Citizens (Germany), a political party in Germany formerly called ALFA
- Flugschule Wings Alfa, an Austrian hang glider

== See also ==
- Alpha (disambiguation)
- Alfalfa
