= Sax (cigarette) =

Sax Tobacco

SAX
- An old Italian pack of SAX cigarettes, with an Italian text warning at the bottom of the pack.
- Product type: Cigarette
- Produced by: BAT Italia, a division of British American Tobacco
- Country: Italy
- Introduced: 1961; 65 years ago
- Markets: Italy, Spain
- Previous owners: Ente Tabacchi Italiani

SAX (also known as SAX Musical) is an Italian brand of cigarettes, currently owned and manufactured by BAT Italia, a subsidiary of British American Tobacco.

== History ==
The brand was founded in 1961 and was sold in a traditional red pack with a saxophone emitting music until 1979, when the design was overhauled and the pack design was changed to dark green. It is known as one of the older-style brand of cigarettes, along with MS and Alfa.

The brand was originally owned by the "Monopolio di Stato" or State Monopoly in English, until the Ente Tabacchi Italiani company was founded in 1998 and took over all manufacturing. After ETI got taken over by British American Tobacco and became BAT Italia, the company is responsible for production of the brand.

The brand is currently marketed as a mid-tier brand which is not too expensive.

In March 2004, it was reported that the price of cigarettes was increased by 50 cents and a pack of SAX cigarettes cost €2,80.

In January 2015, it was reported that the price of cigarettes was increased by 40 cents and a pack of SAX cigarettes cost €4,50.

As of 2017, a 20-pack of SAX cigarettes cost €4,40.

== Controversy ==
=== Italian smokers want compensation over deceit of cigarettes ===
In June 2010, it was reported that 3.5 million Italian smokers demanded compensation from BAT Italia due to the increase in the addictiveness of their cigarettes and not eliminating the nicotine in their cigarettes. The compensation that every person can claim is €3000 and the brands in question are MS, Alfa, Bis, Brera, Colombo, Cortina, Esportazione, Eura, HB, Kent, Lido, MS Club, Mundial, Nazionale, Nazionali, N80, Rothmans, SAX Musical, St. Moritz, Stop, Super, Zenit, Vogue, Dunhill, Lucky Strike and Pall Mall.

== Sponsorship ==
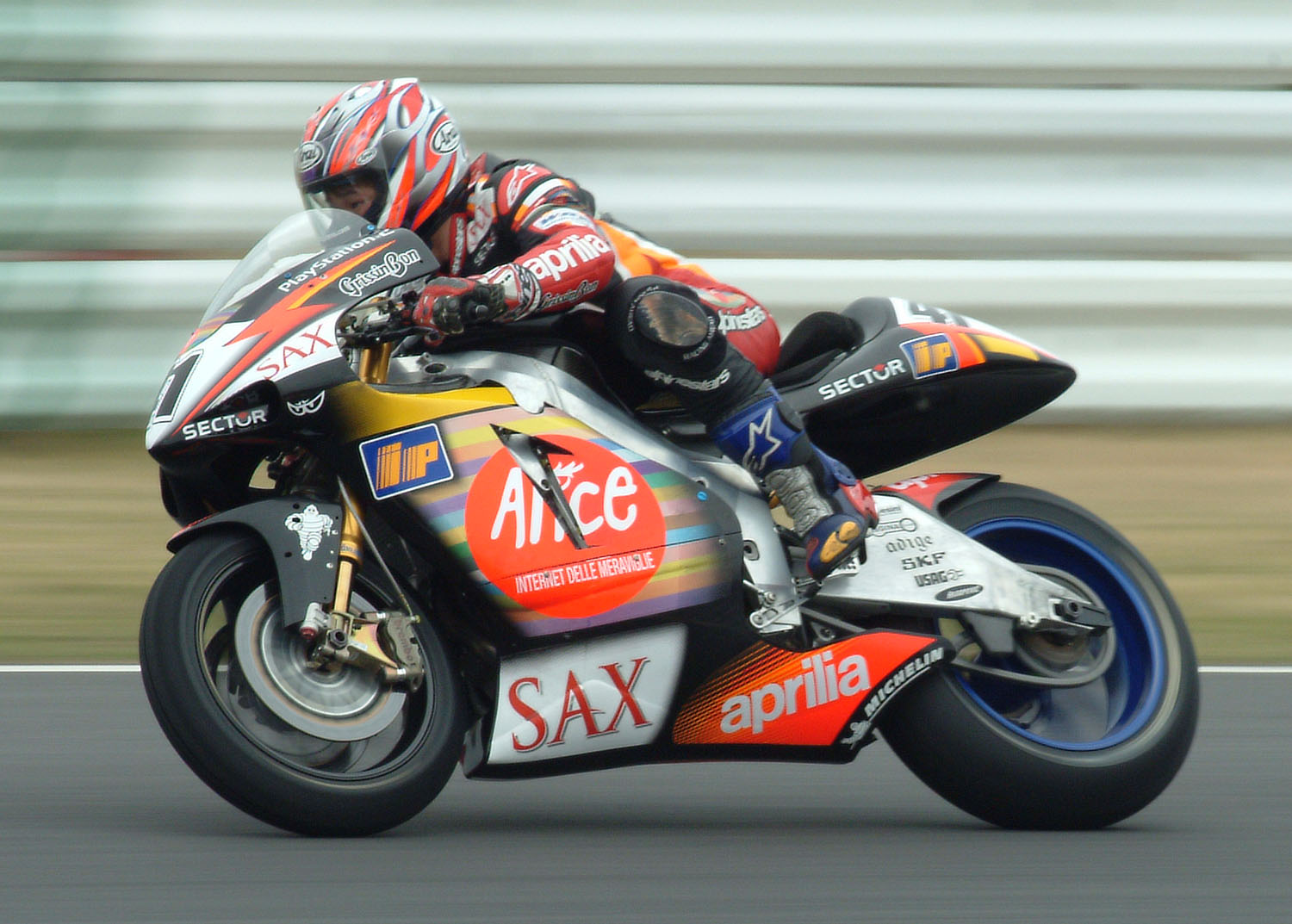
Noriyuki Haga riding the Aprilia RS Cube at the 2003 Japanese Grand Prix. Notice the SAX sponsorship at the bottom.

=== MotoGP ===
SAX cigarettes were a sponsor of the Aprilia Racing Team in the 2003 Grand Prix motorcycle racing season.

== Products ==
Below is a list of all the SAX cigarette variants:

- SAX Musical Passion (Formerly called SAX Special and SAX Red)
- SAX Musical Emotion (Formerly called SAX Light and SAX Blu)
- SAX Musical Sensation (Formerly known as SAX Ultra and SAX Azure)

== Ingredients ==
The following ingredients are used in all SAX cigarette variants:

- Tobacco
- Water
- Monopropylene Glycol
- Sugars (sucrose, invert sugar, cane sugar, sorbitol)
- Licorice juice
- Cocoa
- Honey
- Natural and artificial flavors

== See also ==
- Tobacco smoking
