= Alpha (given name) =

Alpha is a unisex given name. Notable people named Alpha include:

- Alpha Acosta (born 1973), Mexican actress
- Alpha Bâ, Senegalese footballer
- Alpha Bangura (born 1980), American-Sierra Leone basketball player
- Alpha Barry (born 1970), Burkinabé politician and journalist
- Alpha Blondy (born 1953), reggae singer and international recording artist
- Alpha L. Bowser (1910–2003), US Marine Corps lieutenant general
- Alpha Brumage (1880–1963), American football player and coach of football, basketball and baseball
- Alpha Chiang (born 1927), American mathematical economist, professor, and author
- Alpha Condé (born 1938), Guinean politician, fourth president of Guinea
- Alpha Diallo (disambiguation), multiple people
- Alpha Mandé Diarra (born 1954), Malian author
- Alpha Jamison (1875–1962), American football player and coach of football and basketball
- Alpha Kaba (born 1996), French professional basketball player in Turkey
- Alpha B. Kamara (born 1978), sprinter from Sierra Leone
- Alpha Oumar Konaré (born 1946), Malian politician, former President of Mali
- Alpha Nyan (born 1978), Norwegian retired footballer
- Alpha Rwirangira (born 1986), Rwandan singer/song writer
- Alpha Sissoko (born 1997), French footballer
- Alpha Oumar Sow (Guinean footballer) (born 1997)
- Alpha Oumar Sow (Senegalese footballer) (born 1984)
- Alpha Wann (born 1989), French rapper and songwriter

== See also ==
- Alpha (disambiguation)
