= Murray Enkin =

Canadian physician and writer (1924–2021)

Murray W. Enkin
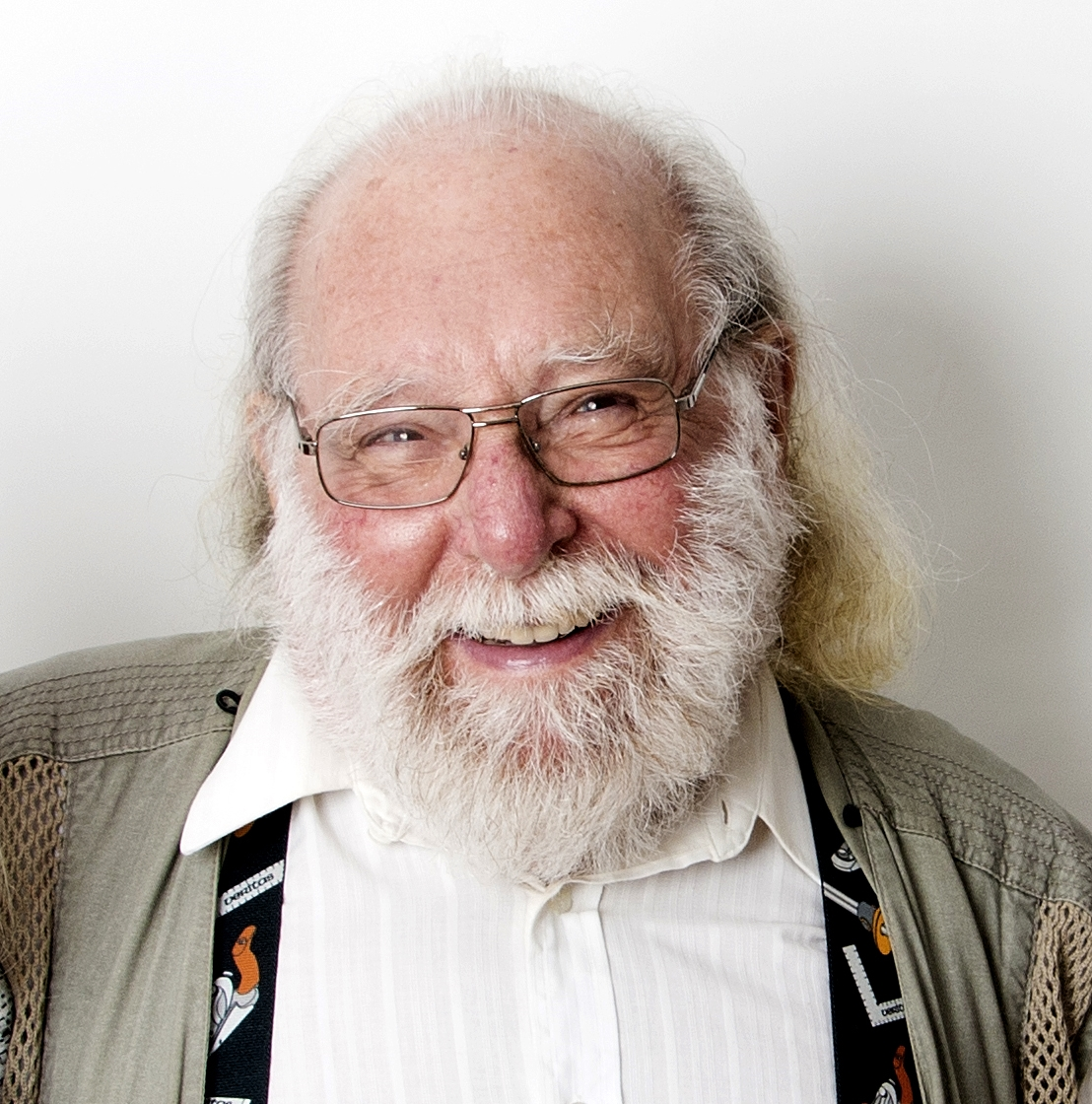
- Murray Enkin in 2017
- Born: May 29, 1924; Toronto, Ontario, Canada
- Died: June 6, 2021 (aged 97); Victoria, BC, Canada
- Education: University of Toronto
- Occupations: Physician, writer
- Employer: McMaster University
- Known for: Advocacy for midwifery
- Awards: Order of Canada (2012)

Murray W. Enkin (May 29, 1924 – June 6, 2021) was a Canadian physician and writer. He was born in Toronto, Ontario, and studied medicine at the University of Toronto and later specialized as an obstetrician and gynaecologist at Long Island College Hospital in Brooklyn. He was a professor, philosopher, activist, public speaker and author, who contributed to the fields of maternal care and childbirth, and evidence-based medicine.

== Career and impact ==
In 2012 Enkin was awarded the Order of Canada for "his contributions to maternal care and the development of midwifery as a recognized profession in Canada." CBC reported at that time that "he lived and worked in Hamilton for nearly 60 years where his practices and research into family-centred maternal care grew to become the norm across the country." He became a faculty member at McMaster University's School of Medicine not long after its founding.

He was an advocate and speaker for the International Childbirth Education Foundation and advocated family-centred maternity including the presence of partners at childbirth, and newborn care with the baby rooming in.

He was an early supporter of midwifery as a profession, contributing "to midwives becoming accepted members of the health care system in Ontario and to setting a tone of collaboration and respect between midwives and other health care professions." In 1982, he was an expert witness in a court case which led to the establishment of midwifery as a profession in Canada. During his time in Hamilton, he is also credited by Lynn Johnston with inspiring her career as a cartoonist.

He has been a member of the editorial board for the journal Birth since the publication's founding in 1973. Enkin co-authored Effective Care in Pregnancy and Childbirth (1989), which, according to a review in Science, "moved obstetrics from the rear to the forefront of scientifically based clinical disciplines", and provided the basis for The Cochrane Collaboration.

Murray Enkin died on June 6, 2021.

== Books ==
- Enkin, Murray; Iain Chalmers (1982). Effectiveness and Satisfaction in Antenatal Care. MacKeith Press. ISBN 0901260592.
- Chalmers, Iain; Murray Enkin; Marc J.N.C. Keirse (1989). Effective Care in Pregnancy and Childbirth. Oxford University Press. ISBN 9780192615589.
- Enkin, Murray; Marc J.N.C. Keirse; James Neilson; Caroline Crowther; Lelia Duley; Ellen Hodnett; Justus Hofmeyer (third edition 2000). A Guide to Effective Care in Pregnancy and Childbirth. Oxford University Press. ISBN 978-0192631732.
- Jadad, Alejandro R.; Murray Enkin (second edition 2007). Randomized controlled trials: Question, answers, and musings. Malden, Massachusetts: Blackwell Publishing. ISBN 9781405132664.
- Enkin, Murray (2021). Musings: Time, Place, and Beyond. ISBN 9781006913099
