= The Birth =

The Birth may refer to:

- The Birth (The Cosby Show), an episode of The Cosby Show
- The Birth (album), an album by Stardeath and White Dwarfs
- The Birth (EP), an EP by Rasco

== See also ==
- Birth (disambiguation)
