= Ousman Nyan =

Norwegian footballer (born 1975)

Personal information
- Full name: Ousman Nyan
- Date of birth: August 5, 1975 (age 51)
- Place of birth: Gambia
- Height: 1.65 m (5 ft 5 in)
- Position: Midfielder

Youth career
- Drafn

Senior career*
Years	Team	Apps	(Gls)
–1994	Mjøndalen		
1994–1999	Strømsgodset	136	(17)
2000–2002	Start		
2002–2003	AC Ajaccio	3	(0)
2003–2004	Sogndal	26	(0)
2005–2009	Strømsgodset	84	(4)
- * Club domestic league appearances and goals

Ousman Nyan (born August 5, 1975) is a retired Norwegian footballer.

His brother Alpha Nyan is also a football player and coach.
