= Birth (disambiguation) =

Birth or parturition is the act or process of bearing or bringing forth offspring.

Birth may also refer to:

- Childbirth, birth in humans

== Film and television ==
- Birth, a 1917 documentary film by Alfred C. Abadie and Alfred Warman
- Birth (1984 film), an anime film
- Birth (2004 film), a film starring Nicole Kidman
- Birth (2024 film), a Spanish-Romanian drama film
- "Birth" (American Horror Story), a 2011 television episode
- "Birth" (Human Resources), a 2022 television episode
- "Birth" (QI), a 2004 television episode

== Literature ==
- Birth (journal), a medical journal for childbirth research
- Arm of Kannon or Birth, a manga

== Music ==
- Birth (album), a 1971 album by Keith Jarrett
- "Birth" (KAT-TUN song) (2011)
- Birth (The Peddlers song) (1969)

== Other uses ==
- Kamen Rider Birth, a character in Japanese drama Kamen Rider OOO
- Birth (video game), a 2023 puzzle video game

== See also ==
- Berth (disambiguation)
- Alpha (disambiguation)
- Beginning (disambiguation)
- Construction (disambiguation)
