= Andrew Page =

Andrew Page may refer to:

- Andrew Page (diplomat), British diplomat
- Andrew Page (businessman), British businessman
- Andy Page, a character in the short story The Loaded Dog
