= Moonbase (disambiguation) =

A moonbase is an element in the hypothetical or fictional colonization of the Moon.

Moonbase or Moon base may also refer to:

- Moon Base One, a 1960 novel by Hugh Walters
- Moonbase (video game), a 1990 city-building video game
- The Moonbase, a 1967 Doctor Who serial
- Moonbase 3, a 1973 British science fiction television programme
- Moonbase 8, a 2020 American comedy television series
- MoonBase Commander, a 2002 strategy computer game
- Project Moonbase, a 1953 science fiction film
- Project Moonbase (podcast), a retrofuturistic music podcast

== See also ==
- Moonbase Alpha (disambiguation)
