= Beavercreek, Ohio =

- City
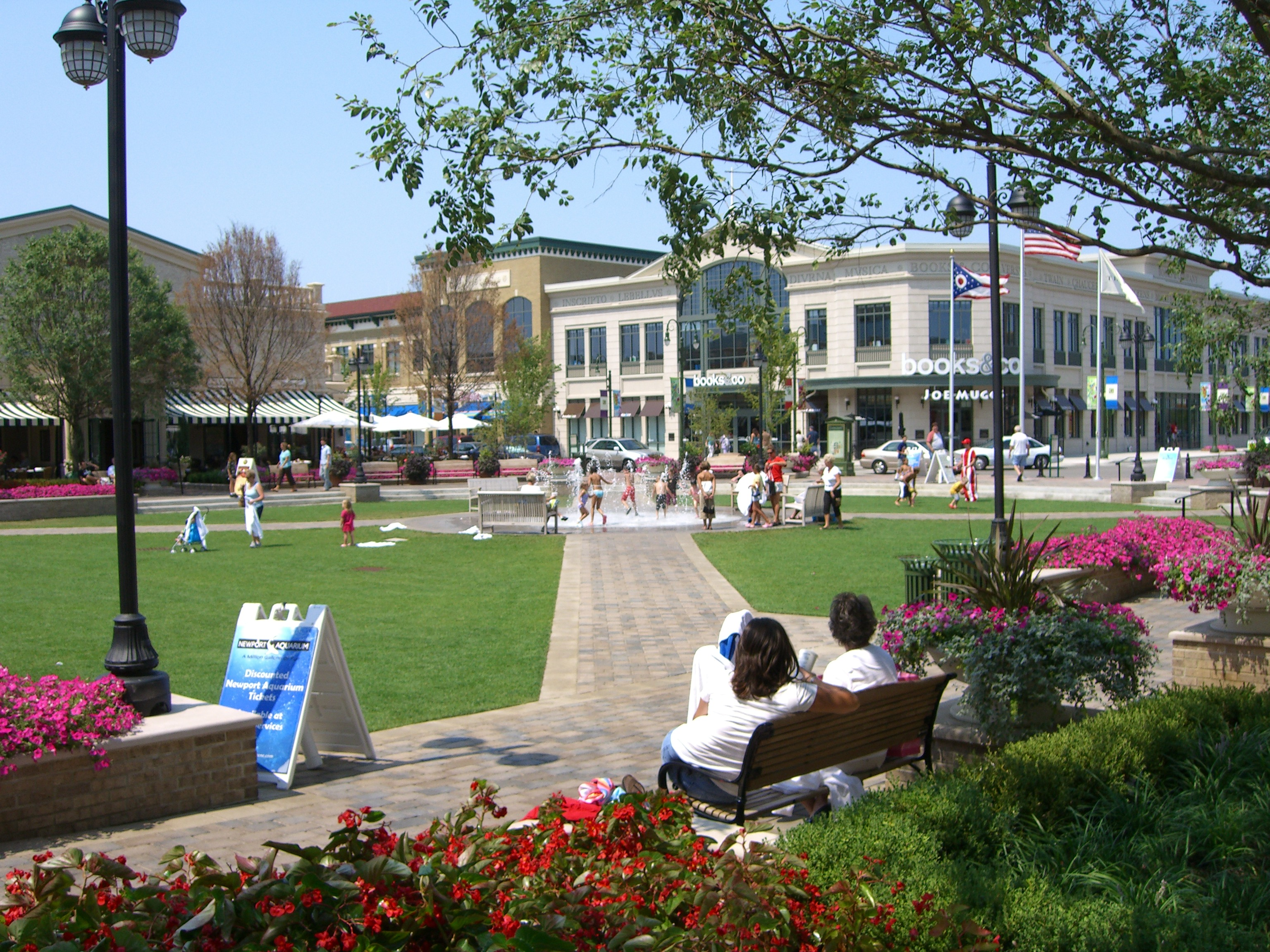
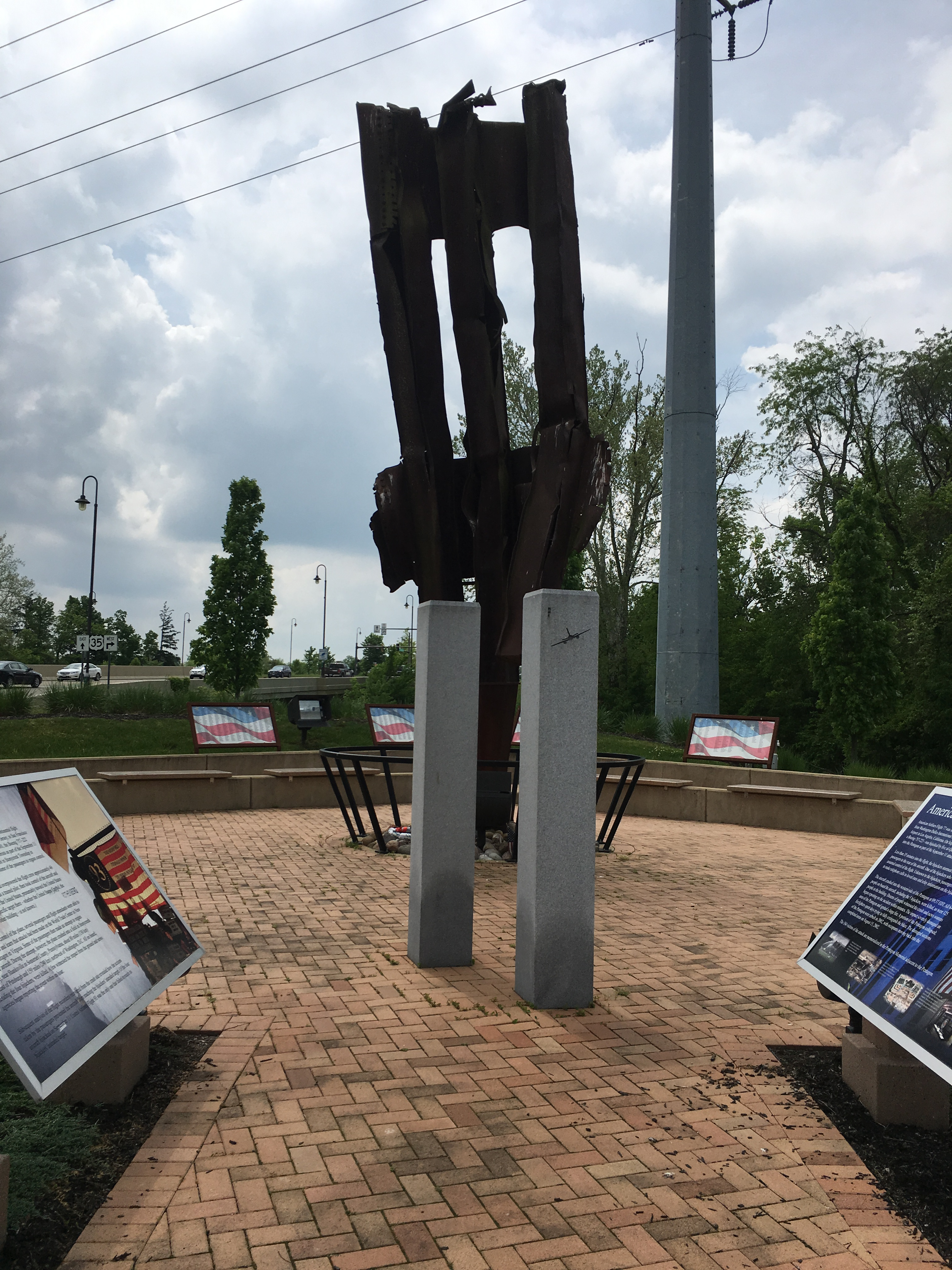
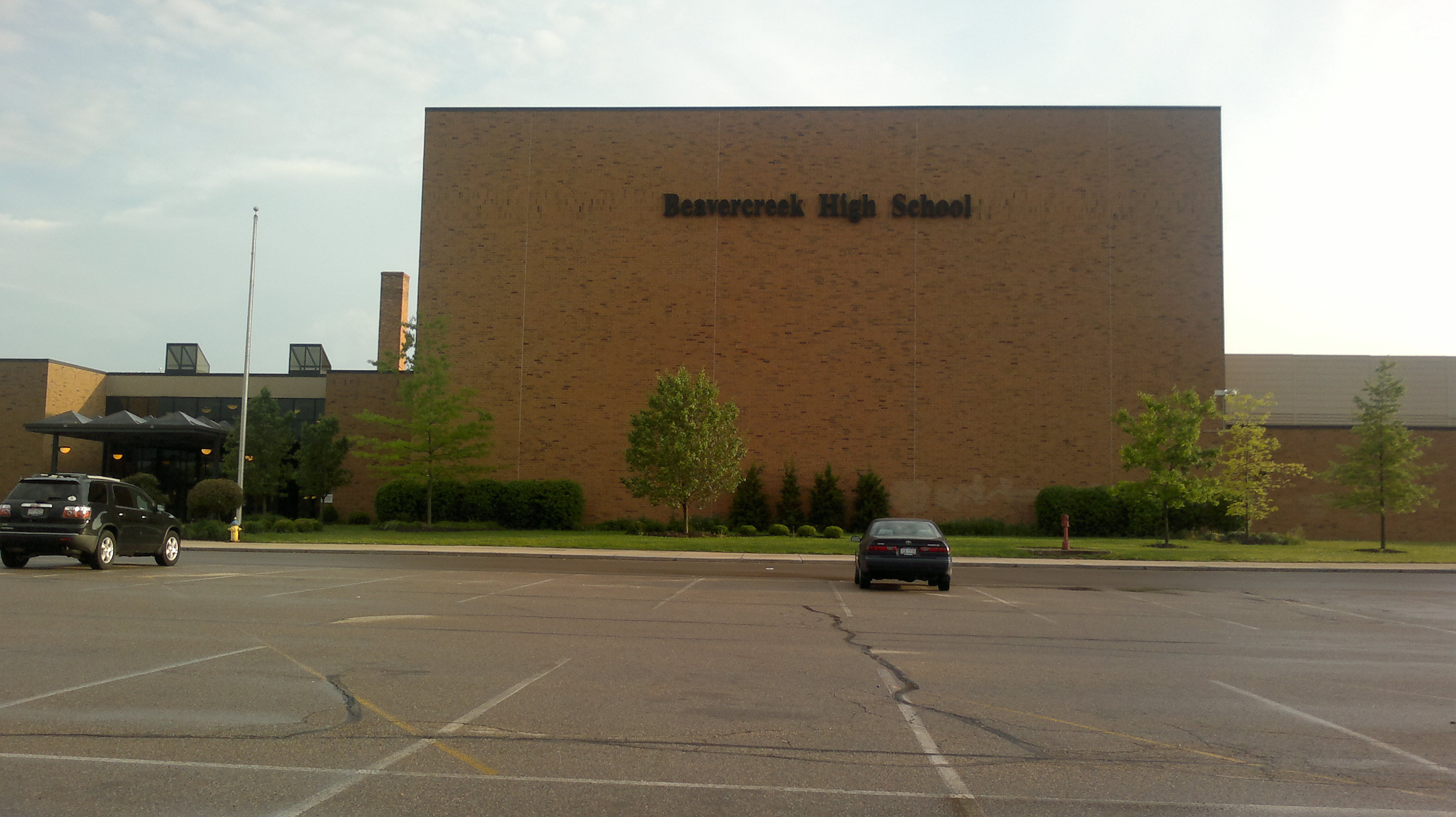
- The Greene Town Center 9-11 Memorial Beavercreek High School
- Interactive map of Beavercreek, Ohio
- Location within Ohio Location within the United States
- Coordinates: 39°44′40″N 84°03′38″W
- Country: United States
- State: Ohio
- County: Greene
- Incorporated: 1980

Government
  - Mayor: Don Adams
  - City manager: Pete Landrum

Area
  - Total: 26.63 sq mi (68.96 km^{2})
  - Land: 26.59 sq mi (68.88 km^{2})
  - Water: 0.031 sq mi (0.08 km^{2})
- Elevation: 873 ft (266 m)

Population (2020)
  - Total: 46,549
  - Estimate (2023): 47,194
  - Density: 1,750.4/sq mi (675.83/km^{2})
- Time zone: UTC-5 (Eastern (EST))
  - Summer (DST): UTC-4 (EDT)
- ZIP codes: Zip codes: 45305, 45324, 45430-45434, 45440
- Area codes: 937, 326
- FIPS code: 39-04720
- GNIS feature ID: 2394102
- Website: City website

Beavercreek is a city in Greene County, Ohio, United States. The population was 46,549 at the 2020 census, making it the largest city in the county.

== History ==
The Beavercreek area was settled in the early 1800s. A part of Beavercreek Township was incorporated and became the city of Beavercreek in February 1980.

== Geography ==
Beavercreek is approximately five miles east of downtown Dayton. According to the 2010 census, the city has a total area of 26.44 square miles (68.5 km^{2}), of which 26.40 square miles (68.4 km^{2}) (or 99.85%) is land and 0.04 square miles (0.10 km^{2}) (or 0.15%) is water. Beavercreek includes the former unincorporated communities of Alpha, Knollwood, most of New Germany, and Zimmerman.

== Demographics ==
Historical population
Census	Pop.	Note	%±
1980	31,589		—
1990	33,626		6.4%
2000	37,984		13.0%
2010	45,193		19.0%
2020	46,549		3.0%
2025 (est.)	48,134		3.4%
Population 1980-2000.

=== 2020 census ===
As of the 2020 census, Beavercreek had a population of 46,549. The median age was 40.6 years. 21.3% of residents were under the age of 18 and 20.0% of residents were 65 years of age or older. For every 100 females there were 99.3 males, and for every 100 females age 18 and over there were 97.5 males age 18 and over.

As of the 2020 census, 99.2% of residents lived in urban areas, while 0.8% lived in rural areas.

As of the 2020 census, there were 18,931 households in Beavercreek, of which 27.9% had children under the age of 18 living in them. Of all households, 56.2% were married-couple households, 17.7% were households with a male householder and no spouse or partner present, and 21.3% were households with a female householder and no spouse or partner present. About 27.4% of all households were made up of individuals and 10.4% had someone living alone who was 65 years of age or older.

As of the 2020 census, there were 19,980 housing units, of which 5.3% were vacant. Among occupied housing units, 72.6% were owner-occupied and 27.4% were renter-occupied. The homeowner vacancy rate was 0.8% and the rental vacancy rate was 6.2%.

Racial composition as of the 2020 census
Race	Number	Percent
White	38,686	83.1%
Black or African American	1,493	3.2%
American Indian and Alaska Native	91	0.2%
Asian	2,785	6.0%
Native Hawaiian and Other Pacific Islander	20	<0.1%
Some other race	464	1.0%
Two or more races	3,010	6.5%
Hispanic or Latino (of any race)	1,671	3.6%

=== 2010 census ===
As of the census of 2010, there were 45,193 people, 18,195 households, and 12,542 families residing in the city. The population density was 1,711.9 inhabitants per square mile (661.0/km^{2}). There were 19,449 housing units at an average density of 736.7 per square mile (284.4/km^{2}). The racial makeup of the city was 88.5% White, 2.5% African American, 0.2% Native American, 5.9% Asian, 0.5% from other races, and 2.3% from two or more races. Hispanic or Latino of any race were 2.6% of the population.

There were 18,195 households, of which 30.0% had children under the age of 18 living with them, 58.9% were married couples living together, 6.8% had a female householder with no husband present, 3.2% had a male householder with no wife present, and 31.1% were non-families. 24.9% of all households were made up of individuals, and 8% had someone living alone who was 65 years of age or older. The average household size was 2.47 and the average family size was 2.98.

The median age in the city was 40.4 years. 22.6% of residents were under the age of 18; 8.5% were between the ages of 18 and 24; 24.8% were from 25 to 44; 29.6% were from 45 to 64; and 14.3% were 65 years of age or older. The gender makeup of the city was 49.9% male and 50.1% female.

=== 2000 census ===
As of the census of 2000, there were 37,984 people, 14,071 households, and 11,087 families residing in the city. The population density was 1,439.2 inhabitants per square mile (555.7/km^{2}). There were 14,769 housing units at an average density of 559.6 per square mile (216.1/km^{2}). The racial makeup of the city was 93.45% White, 1.42% African American, 0.17% Native American, 3.50% Asian, 0.02% Pacific Islander, 0.31% from other races, and 1.13% from two or more races. Hispanic or Latino of any race were 1.14% of the population.

There were 14,071 households, out of which 35.2% had children under the age of 18 living with them, 70.7% were married couples living together, 5.8% had a female householder with no husband present, and 21.2% were non-families. 17.5% of all households were made up of individuals, and 5.7% had someone living alone who was 65 years of age or older. The average household size was 2.66 and the average family size was 3.02.

In the city the population was spread out, with 25.3% under the age of 18, 6.3% from 18 to 24, 26.9% from 25 to 44, 29.3% from 45 to 64, and 12.2% who were 65 years of age or older. The median age was 40 years. For every 100 females, there were 97.7 males. For every 100 females age 18 and over, there were 95.7 males.

The median income for a household in the city was $68,801, and the median income for a family was $75,965. Males had a median income of $55,270 versus $33,572 for females. The per capita income for the city was $48,298. About 1.5% of families and 2.4% of the population were below the poverty line, including 1.9% of those under age 18 and 3.7% of those age 65 or over.

== Government ==
Beavercreek is governed by six city council members, elected at large with rotating terms every four years, and a directly elected mayor. The council member receiving the most votes in the most recent election will serve as vice mayor. Council members are elected in odd-numbered years for terms beginning in even-numbered years. The office of mayor became directly elected in 2019, with Bob Stone serving as the first directly elected mayor of Beavercreek.

Don Adams has been the mayor of Beavercreek since 2024. The city manager is appointed by the city council and serves as the chief administrative officer of the city according to the city's charter. As of 2026, the city manager is Pete Landrum. The city has a public-access television cable TV channel, on which all public meetings can be seen live and are rerun later.

== Parks and recreation ==
The Beavercreek City Parks department operates and maintains 24 parks and other properties. Beavercreek Station is a hub along Creekside Trail, a bike path that stretches from Xenia to Eastwood MetroPark in Dayton.

== Education ==
Beavercreek City School District consists of one preschool, six elementary schools, two middle schools, a Freshman School, and Beavercreek High School. Beavercreek has a public library, a branch of the Greene County Public Library.

== Transportation ==
The Greater Dayton Regional Transit Authority provides bus service in the city.

== Notable people ==
- Aftab Pureval, attorney and politician, 70th mayor of Cincinnati
- Janet C. Wolfenbarger, former commander of Air Force Materiel Command and first female four-star general of the U.S. Air Force
