= MS (cigarette) =

Italian cigarette brand

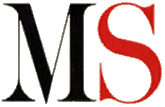
- Product type: Cigarette
- Current owner: British American Tobacco
- Produced by: British American Tobacco
- Country: Italy
- Introduced: 1969; 57 years ago
- Markets: Italy, Spain, France, Germany, Austria, Slovenia, Brazil
- Previous owners: Ente Tabacchi Italiani

MS is an Italian brand of cigarettes manufactured by the Italian subsidiary of British American Tobacco.

MS was manufactured by the Italian company Ente Tabacchi Italiani, and owned by the Italian State Monopoly, until E.T.I. was introduced by British American Tobacco in 2004. This change made MS part of the BAT Italia line of brands. MS is mainly sold in Italy, but the brand is also sold in other European countries, such as Austria and Spain.

== History ==
MS was founded in 1969 by the Italian company "Ente Tabacchi Italiani" and owned by the State Monopoly. Within a few years, it became the most popular brand of cigarettes in Italy due to the strong sense of "Italianism" the brand portrays.

The brand has appeared in many Italian movies, especially during the 1970s, and was even endorsed by Italian actor Nino Manfredi.

MS grew in popularity and in the mid-1980s it reached its peak in sales. During that time, the brand also expanded in variants. MS was manufactured for years at the Manifattura Tabacchi plant in the city of Rovereto, Trentino. Due to the factories importance it had its own set of train tracks leading from the railway station into the plant. The tracks of the line that led to the Stazione Leopolda passed through the factory, in the direction of Cascine, passing under the railway bridge.

The building was built during the Fascist era for the production of cigarettes. Over time, the Tobacco Factory replaced the two factories used for processing tobacco located at the ex-convent of St. Ursula. A plaque in the Piazza Puccini recalls how the Tobacco Factory was on the war front along the Mugone river in August 1944 and was subject to fierce fighting between the partisan fighter of the Italian resistance movement and forces of the Italian Social Republic and Nazi Germany during the Italian Civil War

The factory closed down on 16 March 2001, but MS cigarettes continue to be manufactured in Lecce, Apulia. The tobacco employed for MS cigarettes originally came from Sardinia.

== Sport sponsorship ==
MS was a sponsor of the Aprilia team in the MotoGP from its team's entrance into the sport in 2002 until its departure in 2004.

MS was also a sponsor of the Osella Formula 1 team in the 1980 Formula One season, with Eddie Cheever behind the wheel.

== Markets ==
MS is mainly sold in Italy, but also is or was sold in Spain, France, Germany, Austria, Slovenia and Brazil.

== Products ==
- MS Bionde (ex MS Filtro)
- MS Rosse (ex Mild)
- MS Chiare (ex Light)
- MS Bianche (ex Extra Light)
- 821 full, blue, white AMERICAN BLEND (ex MS 821 with the E.T.I lion on the pack)
- MS International 100's
- MS 100's
- MS Red
- MS Rosa (ex Extra Mild)
- Club slim (ex MS Club)
- Brera slim (ex MS Brera)
- MS Blu
- MS Red
- MS Azzurre
- MS Special
- MS Stilo
- MS Classic
- MS Nazionali

Below are all the current brands of MS cigarettes sold, with the levels of tar, nicotine and carbon monoxide included.

Pack of MS cigarettes, with an Italian text warning at the bottom

Pack	Tar	Nicotine	Carbon monoxide
MS Rosse hard pack	10 mg	0,8 mg	10 mg
MS Rosse soft pack	10 mg	0,8 mg	10 mg
MS Internazionali 100's	10 mg	0,8 mg	10 mg
MS Blu	10 mg	0,8 mg	10 mg
MS Bionde hard pack	10 mg	0,8 mg	9 mg
MS Bionde soft pack	10 mg	0,8 mg	9 mg
MS Filtro soft pack	10 mg	0,8 mg	9 mg
MS Leggere 100's	6 mg	0,5 mg	7 mg
MS Club Classiche	8 mg	0,8 mg	7 mg
MS Chiare	4 mg	0,4 mg	5 mg
MS Azzurre	7 mg	0,6 mg	8 mg
MS Club Eboli	2 mg	0,1 mg	3 mg
MS Bianche	1 mg	0,1 mg	2 mg
Dati Gazzetta Ufficiale N. 163 del 15 luglio 2010

== See also ==
- Tobacco smoking
