= 98.8 Castle FM =

Coordinates: 55°58′14″N 3°10′13″W

Castle FM
Edinburgh; Scotland
- Frequency: 98.8 MHz
- Branding: Community radio for Edinburgh

Programming
- Format: Community radio

Ownership
- Owner: Leith Community Mediaworks Ltd [dormant]

History
- Last air date: February 2016

Links
- Webcast: http://www.castlefmscotland.com/listen/

98.8 Castle FM (formerly Leith FM) is a radio station, covering the area of Edinburgh. The station started broadcasting on 7 May 2007 and was made available on 98.8FM throughout Edinburgh and its surrounding area as well as online.

On 23 March 2012, the station changed its name to 98.8 Castle FM with the strapline 'Edinburgh's bigger local mix' serving the community of the Capital. The licence-holding company (Leith Community Mediaworks Ltd) filed accounts in 2012 as a dormant company with no assets.

As of mid-December 2015 Castle FM changed its name to "Scotland's Castle", the station is available on all major streaming platforms 24hrs a day playing a mixture of current and oldies with the station's strapline "radio for Scotland".

== Selected former presenters ==
- Robert Baldock & Andy Fielding (Project Moonbase, 2007–2010)
- Paula Cameron
- Nikai Chalaman Cruz
- Al Chivers (The Al Chivers Alternative Show)
- Ally D
- Steven Hogg
- Donnie Hughes
- John Hunt
- Kerry Collins/Norwich (Sublime Sunday)
- Ewan Irvine
- Penny Jackson
- Dave Knight
- John Leslie
- Brad Linton-Boyce (Magic Hat Music Mix)
- Jonathon Rudall (Magic Hat Music Mix)
- Momo
- Lenny Love
- Ray McMahon
- Tony McQue
- Matt Shields
- Jason Smith
- Joanna Sproule
- Kathryn Sproule
- Richard & Carly Templeman
- Pamela Thomson
- Lewis Wilson
