= Wood River, Wisconsin =

- Town
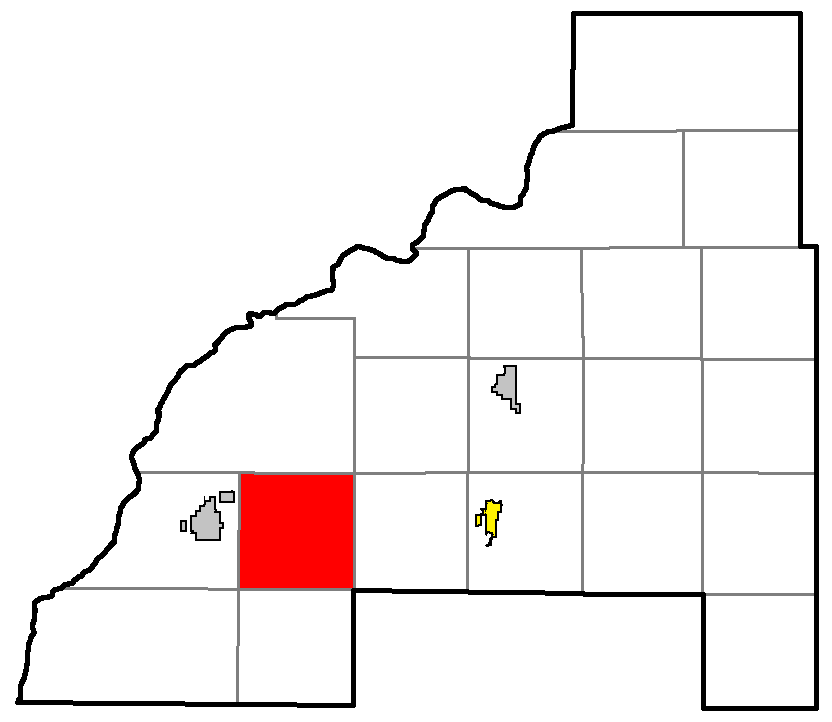
- Location of Wood River, within Burnett County
- Coordinates: 45°45′54″N 92°34′46″W
- Country: United States
- State: Wisconsin
- County: Burnett

Area
  - Total: 35.7 sq mi (92.4 km^{2})
  - Land: 34.1 sq mi (88.2 km^{2})
  - Water: 1.6 sq mi (4.2 km^{2})
- Elevation: 928 ft (283 m)

Population (2020)
  - Total: 898
  - Density: 26.4/sq mi (10.2/km^{2})
- Time zone: UTC-6 (Central (CST))
  - Summer (DST): UTC-5 (CDT)
- Area codes: 715 & 534
- FIPS code: 55-88900
- GNIS feature ID: 1584478
- Website: townofwoodriver.com

Wood River is a town in Burnett County in the U.S. state of Wisconsin. The population was 898 at the 2020 census. The unincorporated community of Alpha is located within the town.

== Geography ==
Wood River is located in southwestern Burnett County. According to the United States Census Bureau. The town has a total area of 35.7 square miles (92.4 km^{2}), of which 34.1 square miles (88.2 km^{2}) is land and 1.6 square miles (4.2 km^{2}), or 4.60%, is water.

== Demographics ==
As of the census of 2000, there were 974 people, 374 households, and 277 families residing in the town. The population density was 28.6 people per square mile (11.0/km^{2}). There were 546 housing units at an average density of 16.0 per square mile (6.2/km^{2}). The racial makeup of the town was 97.43% White, 0.10% African American, 1.13% Native American, 0.31% Asian, 0.10% from other races, and 0.92% from two or more races. Hispanic or Latino of any race were 0.82% of the population.

There were 374 households, of which 31.3% had children under the age of 18 living with them, 63.9% were married couples living together, 6.4% had a female householder with no husband present, and 25.7% were non-families. 21.7% of all households were made up of individuals, and 7.5% had someone living alone who was 65 years of age or older. The average household size was 2.60 and the average family size was 3.06.

In the town, the population was spread out, with 25.8% under the age of 18, 7.0% from 18 to 24, 25.5% from 25 to 44, 27.9% from 45 to 64, and 13.9% who were 65 years of age or older. The median age was 40 years. For every 100 females, there were 106.4 males. For every 100 females age 18 and over, there were 109.0 males.

The median income for a household in the town was $40,476, and the median income for a family was $47,981. Males had a median income of $35,250 versus $21,176 for females. The per capita income for the town was $20,500. About 5.2% of families and 6.9% of the population were below the poverty line, including 14.2% of those under age 18 and 0.7% of those age 65 or over.
