= Moonbase Alpha (disambiguation) =

Moonbase Alpha is a NASA computer simulation, simulator of a moonbase.

Moonbase Alpha may also refer to:

- Moonbase Alpha (Space: 1999), a fictional Moon base from the TV show Space: 1999
  - The Moonbase Alpha Technical Manual, companion book for Space: 1999
- Moon Base Alpha series, a 2014–2018 book series by Stuart Gibbs

== See also ==
- Mars Base Alpha, a proposed lunar base; see SpaceX Mars transportation infrastructure
- Moon base
- Tranquility Base, the first staffed base on the Moon
- Moon Base One, a 1960 science fiction novel
- Moonbase 3, a 1973 British science fiction television programme
- Moonbase (disambiguation)
- Alpha (disambiguation)
