= Ente Tabacchi Italiani =

Italian tobacco company

- Company type: Joint-stock company
- Industry: Cigarette and cigar manufacturing, Salt manufacturing
- Founded: July 9, 1998; 27 years ago in Rome, Commune di Roma Capitale, Italy
- Defunct: May 31, 2004 (sold to British American Tobacco)
- Headquarters: Rome
- Area served: Italy
- Products: Cigarettes, cigars, salt
- Number of employees: 3,969

Ente Tabacchi Italiani - ETI S.p.A. (In English known as the Italian Tobacco Organization or the Italian Tobacco Company) was an Italian public company operating in the tobacco sector.

== History ==
Initially founded as a public body with the legislative decree on 9 July 1998 n. 283, based in Rome, it was subsequently transformed into a joint-stock company on 19 July 2000.

In 2001 it produced 45 million kg of cigarettes, of which 13.200.000 for Philip Morris, and 540 tons of cigars, through 16 cigarette manufacturers and 2 cigar manufactories, reaching an Ebitda of 146 million and an Ebit of 118 million. In 2004 it was privatized through an auction, won by British American Tobacco, at a price of 2,325 million Euros and has since changed its name to British American Tobacco Italia. It was wholly owned by the Italian Ministry of Economy and Finance before the takeover. ETI has inherited the production and marketing of salts and tobacco from the Autonomous Administration of State Monopolies.

== Brands ==
ETI owned the following brands: MS, Nazionali, Sax, Lido, Linda, Eura, Stop, Futura, Alfa and the Tuscan cigar. The company entrusted the distribution of manufactured tobacco to Etinera S.p.A, a subsidiary and participated in the company "Tabacchi italiani SpA" and "Terzia SpA".

== Establishments ==
In 1999, ETI had 18 manufactures, located at:

- Lecce
- Chiaravalle (it)
- Roverto
- Naples
- Lucca
- Bari
- Scafati
- Bologna
- Mesola
- Verona
- Florence
- Modena
- Cagliari
- Trieste (closed in early 1999)
- Catania
- Milan (closed in early 1999)
- Palermo
- Cava de' Tirreni

The factories employed 3,969 employees for a total of 45.51 million kg of manufactured smoke products.

Until 1996 the manufacturing plants of Turin, Adria and Venice were also operational.

At present, the Chiaravalle plants (Manifattura Italiana Tabacco), Lucca and Cava dei Tirreni (Manifattura Sigaro Toscano) are still in production, in which a new plant was also constructed in 2007 in Settimo Torinese (Yesmoke).
