= Project Moonbase (podcast) =

Music podcast

- Genre: Music podcast
- Language: English

Cast and voices
- Hosted by: DJ Bongoboy; MC Zirconium

Production
- Length: 60 minutes

Technical specifications
- Audio format: MP3

Publication
- No. of episodes: 293
- Original release: 15 June 2007; 19 years ago
- Updates: Weekly
- License: CC BY-NC-ND 3.0

Related
- Website: projectmoonbase.com

Project Moonbase is the longest-running retrofuturistic music podcast, recorded in Edinburgh, Scotland, with the tagline "The Historic Sound of the Future".

== Premise ==
The King of the Moon and his hutched companion are stranded in a dilapidated moon base held together by duct tape. Their mission is to explore time and space for unique things to broadcast to humans on Earth. This takes the form of bizarre music and news stories.

The show is named after a 1953 black and white science fiction movie about the attempted sabotage of a moon base in 1970.

== Format ==
Each show includes 12 full music tracks in pairs, often from the 1960s and 1970s (or modern pastiches of such), using exotic instruments such as the Moog synthesizer, steel drum, theremin, chiptune, kazoo, ukulele, and the voice of Wing.

Music from the 1980s is typically excluded, the hosts describing it as "the forbidden decade".

The show includes some regular sections:

- The Unnecessary News, in which MC Zirconium reads humorous science-fiction-related news stories. (Example: "Meat and potato pie 'sent into space' from Wigan")
- The Sea of Tranquillity, in which a contrastingly less-lively music track is played.
- Poetry read by the Dalek Vicar, in which MC Zirconium imitates a polite Dalek.
- Cover versions of the jazz song Caravan (of which over 350 exist).
- Music created and submitted by listeners.

Shows often have a theme that unifies the tracks and news. Often the theme is the music of, or inspired by, a particular artist who is celebrating an anniversary that week. Notably, there have been four episodes (7 hours) dedicated to French Moog musician Jean-Jacques Perrey, whom the hosts describe as "the patron saint of the show". Other example themes have been:

- "Shapes" including tracks named The Glass Triangle, Isosceles Trapezoid, and Hendecagon.
- "Popcorn" featuring numerous covers of the 1969 synth-pop track Popcorn by Gershon Kingsley.
- "Shatnoy" featuring tracks by William Shatner and Leonard Nimoy and covers of Star Trek theme tunes.

Episode 46 ("Cassette Heads") was also available to purchase on physical cassette tape.

There has also been at least one live appearance of Project Moonbase alongside the group Space Dog at the Edinburgh International Science Festival in 2012.

== History ==
=== Leith FM Radio (2007–2010) ===
The first episode of Project Moonbase was broadcast 15 June 2007 on Leith FM, an Edinburgh-based community radio station launched May 2007. Each episode was two hours in length and broadcast from 20:00 to 22:00 on Sunday evenings. After three years, the show ceased being broadcast for undisclosed reasons, though DJ Bongoboy claimed that "we left on good terms, or a least we would have, had anyone been there". The last radio broadcast of Project Moonbase was on 27 June 2010.

Recordings of these shows are not available to the public, but were made available to paying subscribers of Project Moonbase.

=== Podcast (2010–2017) ===
Four months after the final radio broadcast, the show was continued in a podcast format, with the first episode (numbered 001) being released on the date 10/10/10. (One trial podcast had been released previously on 24 July 2010, recorded while still part of Leith FM.)

Aside from the duration being reduced from 2 hours to 1 hour, the format of the show remained unchanged and was released every Sunday evening for the next seven years for a total of 273 episodes plus 20 bonus episodes. These are all available at no cost from the Project Moonbase website, and have also been added to the Internet Archive.

In 2017, DJ Bongoboy suffered a stroke, and was unable to continue hosting in a conversational format. The last episode of the podcast was released 17 March 2017.

=== Spotify (2018–present) ===
The format of the show changed, dividing the content between two media.

Music is presented as a weekly Spotify playlist on a particular theme. The first playlist, entitled "PMB Super Galactic Modulation 1" was released 13 May 2018, and a new one has been released every Sunday since then.

News is reported daily by both hosts via the show's official Facebook and Twitter social media accounts.

== Hosts ==
=== DJ Bongoboy ===
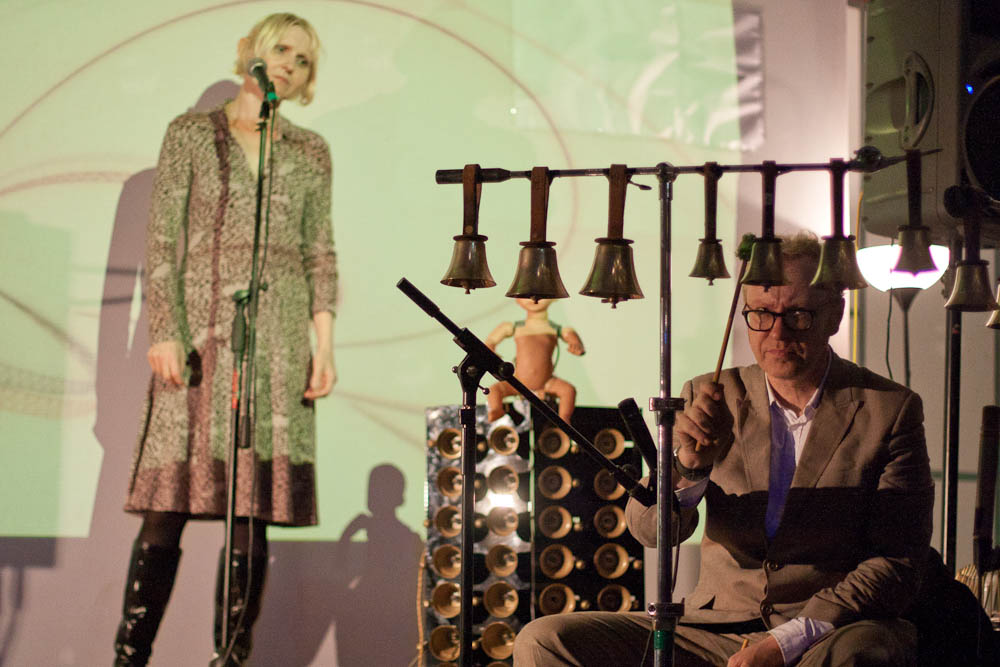
Baldock playing bells with Space Dog, Brighton 2011

The official website describes DJ Bongoboy as a "genial host, broadcaster, polymath, ruthless leader, de-facto king of the moon, Moon-Pope and space-penguin".

His real name is Robert Baldock, from East Lothian, a J2EE technical developer by day, "space age bachelor by night".

He creates experimental music under the name Aleatory Music Systems using "analogue synths, Java applications and Max/MSP/Jitter", and has performed at the Edinburgh Art Festival and Edinburgh Annuale.

He occasionally remixes tracks for the podcast, and has also released items on Bandcamp on behalf of Project Moonbase (with cover art by co-host Fielding) including an album of telephone ringtones Ringtones from Space Volume 1, and a track The Coming of the Dial to accompany telephony-themed podcast episode 208 Dial M For Moonbase.

He has also performed with the group Space Dog in Brighton and Edinburgh.

Baldock suffered a stroke in March 2017 (aged 52) leaving him with acute dysphasia and verbal dyspraxia which prevented him from presenting the podcast. He was forced to move in to more accessible housing.

He appeared on national television and the local newspaper front-page after Scottish First Minister Nicola Sturgeon confirmed that the life-saving thrombectomy operation he received would no longer be available to an expected 600 Scottish patients in 2018. Baldock handed a petition of 4,147 names to Health Secretary Jeane Freeman requesting restoration of thrombectomy as an option for patients. The campaign was successful and the procedure is due to be fully reinstated by 2023.

The musical group The Twelve Hour Foundation, who created the theme tune and jingles for Project Moonbase, released a charity EP (with cover artwork by host Andy Fielding) which raised £350 for The Charles Bell Pavilion unit where Baldock was treated.

=== MC Zirconium ===
The official website describes MC Zirconium as a "jovial sidekick, prisoner, news-hound, dogs-body, dog".

Each show, he reports on quirky stories that he has found on websites such as Boing Boing.

His real name is Andy Fielding, a graphic designer residing in Edinburgh.

Fielding creates unique artwork for every episode of Project Moonbase and sells prints on his own website.

He was the creator of the 2006 Cartoon Network show IMP.

Fielding also created the 2008 animated series Life According to Dinosaurs for UK Channel 4, of which the two dinosaur protagonists were voiced by the pair of Project Moonbase hosts ("Dave Yellow" by Baldock, "Steve Green" by Fielding).

Describing his taste in music, Zirconium said in 2011:

I like my sonification to fill me with terror. If I am listening to radiation emanating from distant parts of the universe, I want to feel horrified by the scientific majesty of it all.

== Recognition ==
Wired magazine had an article by Questlove titled "How to Listen Now" in March 2014 in which Questlove described Project Moonbase as an "oddly specific podcast specialising in sitar-driven psychedelia, 8-bit and other trips".

Rolling Stone magazine's music columnist Colleen Nika wrote "I take head trips with them often – my preferred method of travel of late".

BBC Radio 6 presenter Tom Robinson in his Pick of the Pods podcast in 2011 described Project Moonbase as an "exotic and wonderful musical world".

Mark Barton, editor of Losing Today indie music magazine described the show as "sumptuously populated by all manner of strange sounds, library take outs, lounge lilts and sonic curios".

Musician John Flansburgh of They Might Be Giants recommended Project Moonbase as a "highly entertaining detour into the world of electronic music old, older and sometimes more recent".

The podcast holds a rating of 4.9 stars out of 5 on Apple Podcasts.

== Funding ==
The show features no advertising nor sponsorship, being fully listener-supported.

The website offers Amazon affiliate links so that the show can earn a commission for any music purchased by listeners through their site.

The show offered the opportunity for listeners to purchase a title of nobility on the moon, such as a "Moon Baron", for which they would receive a certificate, have their name displayed in the "Moon Hall of Fame", and also receive access to listen to recordings of episodes of the show from Leith FM that were not available by other means. Musicians reaching 80 years of age were automatically granted an honorary Moon Lordship.

== See also ==
- Mystery Science Theater 3000 – A television show with a similar theme, in which a space janitor and his robotic colleagues provide commentary over old science fiction movies, including the eponymous 1953 Project Moonbase movie (in Season 1, Episode 9).
- Parallel 9 – A television show with a similar theme, in which a transdimensional prisoner is permitted visitors from Earth for two hours each week.
