= Berth =

Berth or berthing may refer to:

== Transport ==
- Berthing, a cabin on a ship or train
- Berthing (spacecraft), the placement of a spacecraft into a berthing mechanism through the use of a robotic arm
- Berth (moorings)
- Sleeping berth

== Other uses ==
- Berth (surname)
- Berth (album), an album by The Used

== See also ==
- Birth (disambiguation)
- Childbirth
