= Alpha, Texas =

- Unincorporated community
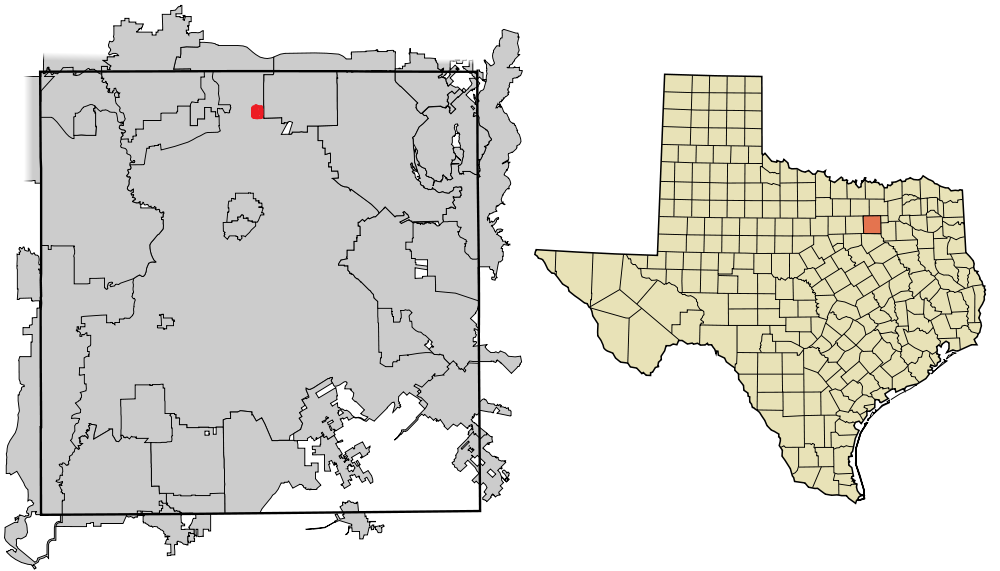
- Location of Alpha, Texas
- Coordinates: 32°56′19″N 96°48′11″W
- Country: United States
- State: Texas
- County: Dallas
- Elevation: 440 ft (134 m)

Population (1987)
  - Total: 50
- Time zone: UTC-6 (Central (CST))
  - Summer (DST): UTC-5 (CDT)
- ZIP code: 75240
- GNIS feature ID: 2012314

Alpha was an unincorporated freedmen's town in Dallas County, Texas, United States. Founded soon after the American Civil War, the town peaked in the 1890s then dwindled in population throughout the 20th century before being delisted as a community in 1987. The area is now an incorporated part of the city of Dallas.

== Geography ==
Alpha was located at 32°56′19″N 96°48′11″W (32.938638, -96.803069), centered on what is now the intersection of Alpha Road and Preston Road in Dallas, Texas. Alpha Road, running east–west across north Dallas, just north of Interstate 635 and just south of Spring Valley Road, is named for the community. Most of the land area is now occupied by gated communities, housing developments, and the Valley View Center shopping mall.

Founded as a freedmen's town just after the Civil War, Alpha was located on land that had been a part of Farmers Branch, Texas, on the main transportation route between Farmers Branch and Garland. The town gained a post office in 1893 and a general store in 1895. While the post office closed in 1904 as Alpha's population stood at 111, by 1933 that figure fell to 50 residents. This population would remain essentially unchanged at the 1980 census and through 1987 when the town was delisted as a community.

The Mount Pisgah Baptist congregation built a church in Alpha in the late 1800s at what is now the corner of Spring Valley Road and Preston Road. This building was rebuilt in 1945 and vacated in 1981 when the church relocated. The building, the last major structure remaining from Alpha's heyday, was rented out and allowed to fall into disrepair. The property was put up for sale in 2010. The building was renovated and, as of 2013, houses a Hispanic congregation.
