= MV Karakayalar =

History
- Name: Skinningrove (1891–95); Pierre-Paul (1895–1900); Isafold (1900–11); Prado (1911–23); Lieutenant Corriol (1923-24); Alpha (1924–30); Maria M. (1930–31); Charalambos Vaiannis (1931–33); H. Esref (1931–58); Ismail Kaptanoğlu (1958–77); Karakayalar (1977-97)
- Owner: Skinningrove Iron Co. Ltd (1891–99); P. Braben et Fils (1899–1900); P. L. Byrde (1900–01); J. P. T. Byrde (1901–11); SA des Transports Côtieres (1911); French Government (1911–23); J. Filippi et Compagnie (1923–24); Mme Papadimitrou & Co. (1924–28); E. Mavroleon (1928–31); Vaiannis & Kariatides (1931–33); Cerah Zade Mehmet Tahsin (1933–36); Cerrahoğlu Mehmet Tahsin (1936–44); Fakir Nadir Zeren (1944–47); Izzet Demirtas (1947–58); Ismail Kaptan ve Ortaklari (1958–65); Ismail Kaptanoğlu (1965–77); Turan Karakaya (1977-97)
- Operator: Owner operated, except –; French Navy (1911–23)
- Port of registry: (United Kingdom of Great Britain and Ireland) Middlesbrough, United Kingdom (1891–95); Bordeaux, France (1895–1900); Copenhagen, Denmark (1900–01); (Denmark) Reykjavík, Iceland (1901–11); (France) Marseille (1911); French Navy (1911–23); (France) Marseille (1923–24); Piraeus, Greece (1924–33); Istanbul, Turkey (1933-97)
- Builder: Wood, Skinner & Co.
- Yard number: 33
- Launched: 28 October 1891
- Completed: December 1891
- Out of service: 2 August 1997
- Identification: United Kingdom Official Number 98773 (1891–95); Code Letters KQJR (1895–1900); Code Letters LBDJ (1901–11); Code Letters ORAU (1923–24); Code Letters JFRM (1924–33); Code Letters TCBM (1933–97)
- Fate: Collided with another vessel and sank

General characteristics
- Type: Cargo ship (1891–1911, 1923–81); Transport ship (1911–23); Dredger (1981–97)
- Tonnage: 347 GRT, 194 NRT
- Length: 140 feet 7 inches (42.85 m)
- Beam: 22 feet 1 inch (6.73 m)
- Depth: 10 feet 9 inches (3.28 m)
- Installed power: Triple expansion steam engine (1891–1954); Diesel engine (1954–97)
- Propulsion: Single screw propeller

Karakayalar was a merchant ship in service for more than a century. She was built in 1891 as the steamship Skinningrove, subsequently serving as Pierre-Paul, Isafold, Prado, Lieutenant Corriol, Alpha, Maria M., Charalambos Vaiannis and H. Esref. Fitted with a diesel engine in 1958, she subsequently served as Ismail Kaptanoğlu and Karakaylar. She collided with a Turkish ferry in 1997 and sank.

== Description ==
As built, the ship was 140 feet 7 inches (42.85 m) long, with a beam of 22 feet 1 inch (6.73 m) and a depth of 10 feet 9 inches (3.28 m). She was powered by a triple expansion steam engine which had cylinders of 10 1/2 inches (27 cm), 17 inches (43 cm) and 28 inches (71 cm) diameter by 21 inches (53 cm) stroke. The engine was built by the North East Marine Engine Co. Ltd., Wallsend, Northumberland, United Kingdom Rated at 40nhp, it drove a single screw propeller. She was assessed at 397 GRT, 194 NRT.

== History ==
Skinningrove was built as yard number 33 by Wood, Skinner & Co., Newcastle upon Tyne, Northumberland for the Skinningrove Iron Co., Middlesbrough, Yorkshire, United Kingdom. She was launched on 28 October 1891 and completed in December. Her port of registry was Middlesbrough. The United Kingdom Official Number 98773 was alloccated. She traded between Skinningrove, Yorkshire and Grangemouth, Stirlingshire.

In 1895Skinningrove was sold to P. Biraben et Fils, Bordeaux, Gironde, France and was renamed Pierre-Paul. Her port of registry was Bordeaux, and the Code Letters KQJR were allocated.

In 1900, Pierre-Paul was sold to P. L. Byrde, Copenhagen, Denmark and was renamed Isafold. Her port of registry was Copenhagen. In 1901, Isafold was sold to J. P. T. Byrde, Reykjavík, Iceland. Her port of registry was Reykjavík, and the Code Letters LBDJ were allocated.

In 1911, Isafold was sold to SA des Transportes Côtieres, Marseille, Bouches-du-Rhône, France and was renamed Prado. Her port of registry was Marseille. Later that year, she passed to the French Government, serving with the French Navy as a transport ship.

In 1923, Prado was sold to J. Filippi et Compagnie, Marseille and was renamed Lieutenant Corriol. Her port of registry was Marseille, and the Code Letters ORAU were allocated.

In 1924, Lieutenant Corriol was sold to Mme Papadimitrou & Co, Piraeus, Greece and was renamed Alpha. Her port of registry was Piraeus, and the Code Letters JFRU were allocated.

In 1928, Alpha was sold to E. Mavroleon, Piraeus. She was renamed Maria M. in 1930. On 8 September 1930, the British tanker Donax leaked benzine at Drapetsona, Greece. The benzine caught fire, destroying seven sailing ships and severely damaging Maria M. In 1931, Maria M. was sold to Vailiannis & Kariaktides, Piraeus and renamed Charalambos Vaiannis.

In 1933, Charalambos Vaiannis was sold to Cerah Zade Mehmet Tahsin, Istanbul, Turkey and was renamed H. Esref. Her port of registry was Istanbul, and the Code Letters TCBM were allocated. In 1936, H. Esref was sold to Cerrahoğlu Mehmet Tahsin, Istanbul. In 1944, H. Esref was sold to Fakir Nadir Zeren, Istanbul. In 1947, H. Esref was sold to Izzet Demirtas, Istanbul. A new diesel engine made by Burmeister & Wain, Copenhagen was fitted in 1954. It had six cylinders of 230mm bore by 400mm stroke.

In 1958, H. Esref was sold to Ismail Kaptan ve Ortaklari, Istanbul and was renamed Ismail Kaptanoğlu. In 1965, Ismail Kaptanoğlu was sold to Ismail Kaptanoğlu, Istanbul.

In 1977, Ismail Kaptanoğlu was sold to Turan Karakaya, Istanbul and was renamed Karakayalar. On 2 August 1997, Karakayalar collided with the Turkish ferry Suadiye in the Sea of Marmara and sank off Heybeliada. Her five crew were rescued. She was the oldest vessel recorded by Lloyd's of London to have been lost in 1997.
