= Birth (video game) =

- Developer: Madison Karrh
- Publisher: Wings Interactive
- Engine: Unity
- Platforms: macOS; Windows; Xbox One
- Release: Win, macOS; WW: February 17, 2023; Xbox; WW: July 28, 2023
- Genre: Puzzle
- Mode: Single-player

Birth is a 2023 puzzle video game developed by Madison Karrh and published by Wings Interactive.

== Gameplay ==
Players control a lonely character who has decided to create a friend out of body parts and castaway objects. Birth is a puzzle game in which players receive these parts after solving puzzles. They can also explore their surreal city and interact with the unusual denizens.

== Development ==
Karrh, who lives in Chicago, said she listened to Frankenstein audiobooks and played the Shenmue video game series while making Birth. There is little dialogue in Birth. Karrh said this was a conscious decision, and she tried to convey as much information as she could without stating anything outright. Wings Interactive released it for Windows and macOS on February 17, 2023, and for Xbox One on July 28, 2023.

== Reception ==
Reception

Review scores
Publication	Score
Eurogamer	Recommended
The Guardian	5/5

Rock Paper Shotgun's reviewer said it is "weirdly the most wholesome yet creepy game I've ever played", and that its humor offsets the grossness and creepiness. In recommending Birth, Eurogamer called it an "elegant and empathetic study of solitude". Both Rock Paper Shotgun and Eurogamer subsequently included it in their list of favorite games from 2023. The Guardian said it is "a simple yet profound exploration of loneliness".
