= Manifattura Tabacchi =

Tobacco factory in Rovereto, Trentino-Alto Adige, Italy

Coordinates: 45.8838°N 11.0212°E

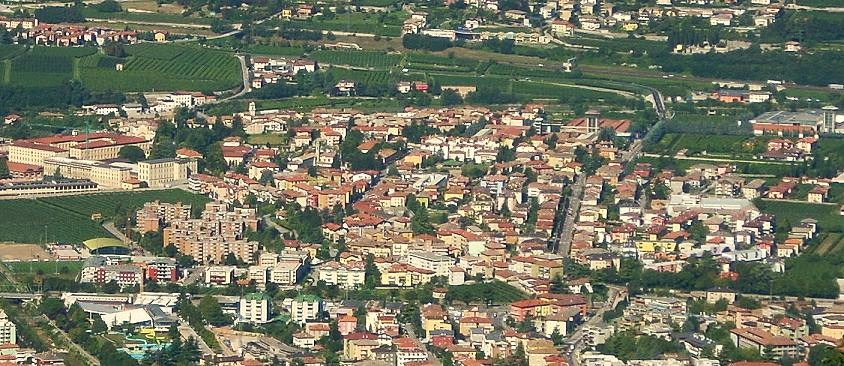
View of Borgo Sacco area; to the left is the historic "Manifattura Tabacchi" tobacco plant

In the 1800s, when the Austro-Hungarian Empire controlled the territories of the upper Adige valley in northern Italy, a tobacco plant was built in the town of Borgo Sacco, now part of the city of Rovereto. An earlier name for this tobacco factory was Imperia Regia Manifattura d'Austria-Ungheria (translation: Imperial and Royal Tobacco Manufacturing of the Austro-Hungarian Empire).

== Origins ==
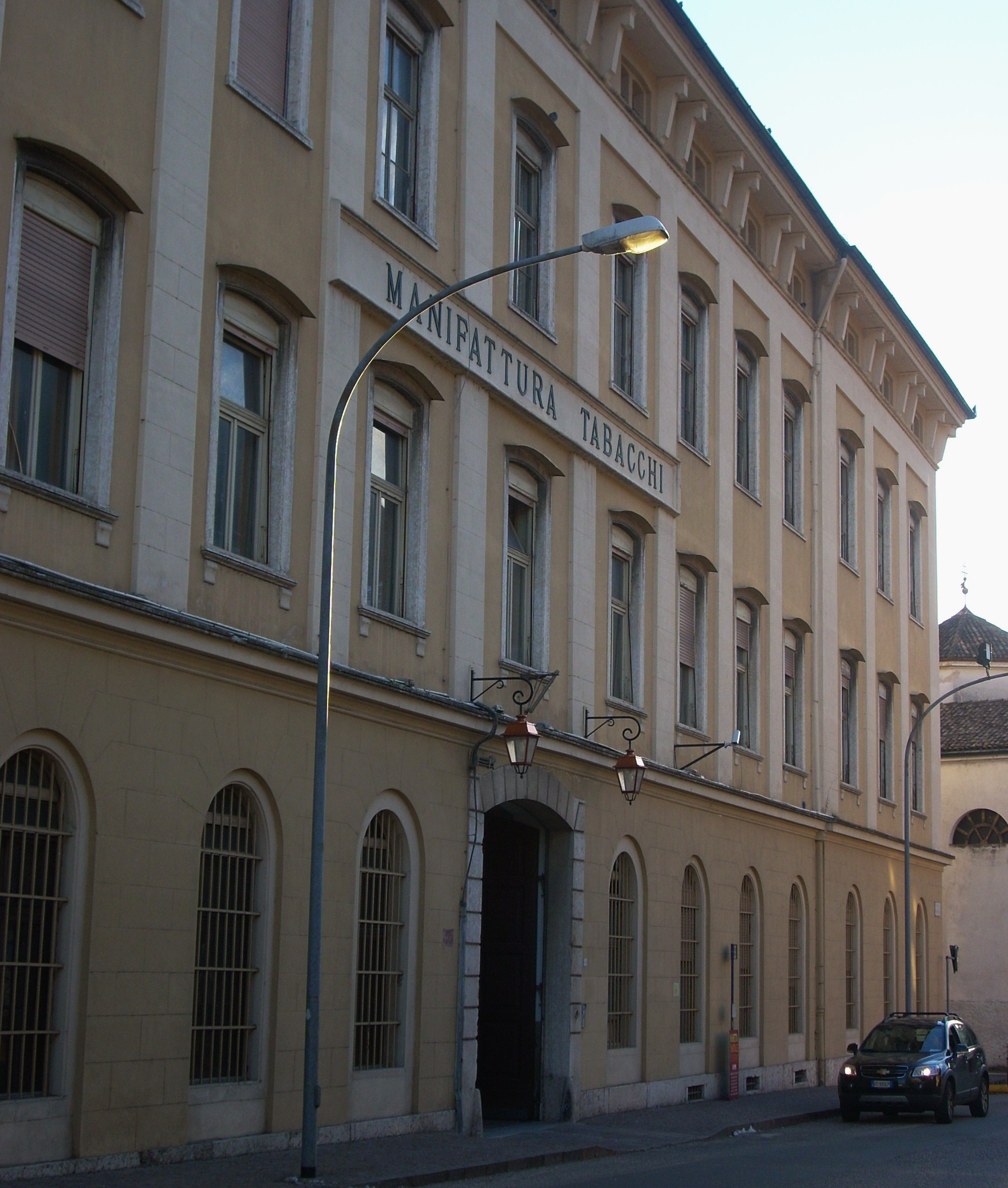
Main entrance (north)

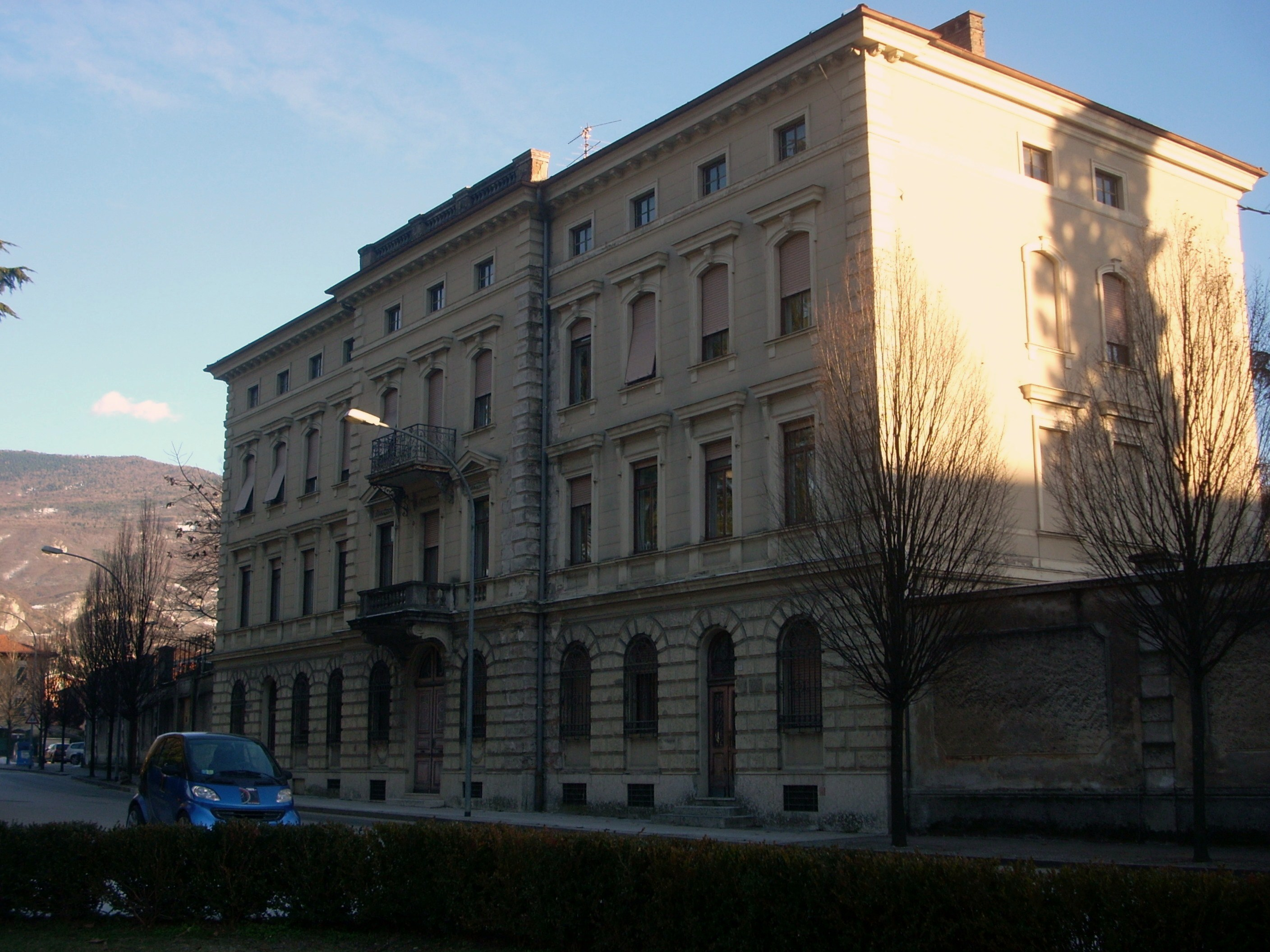
Secondary north entrance

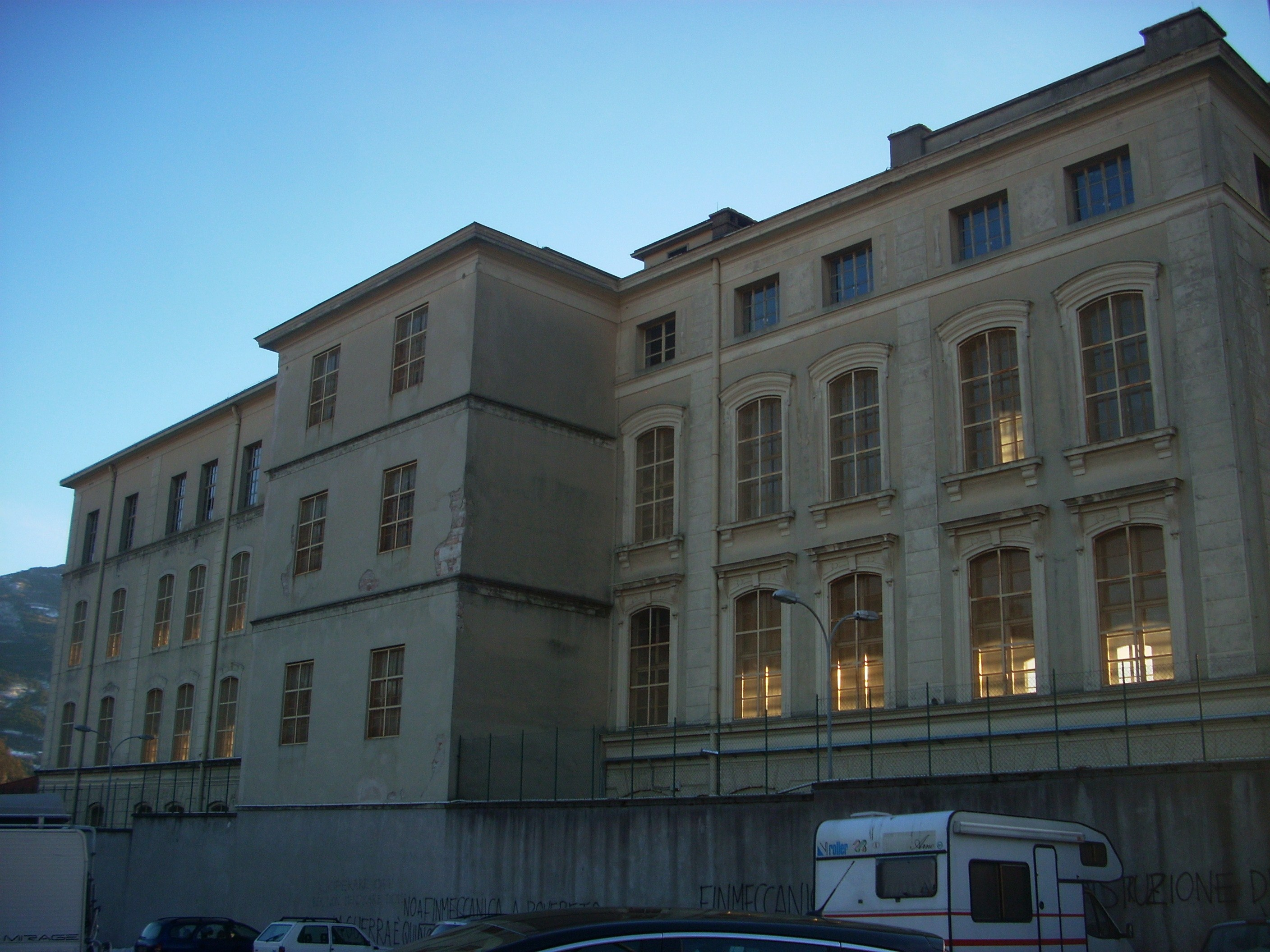
East side

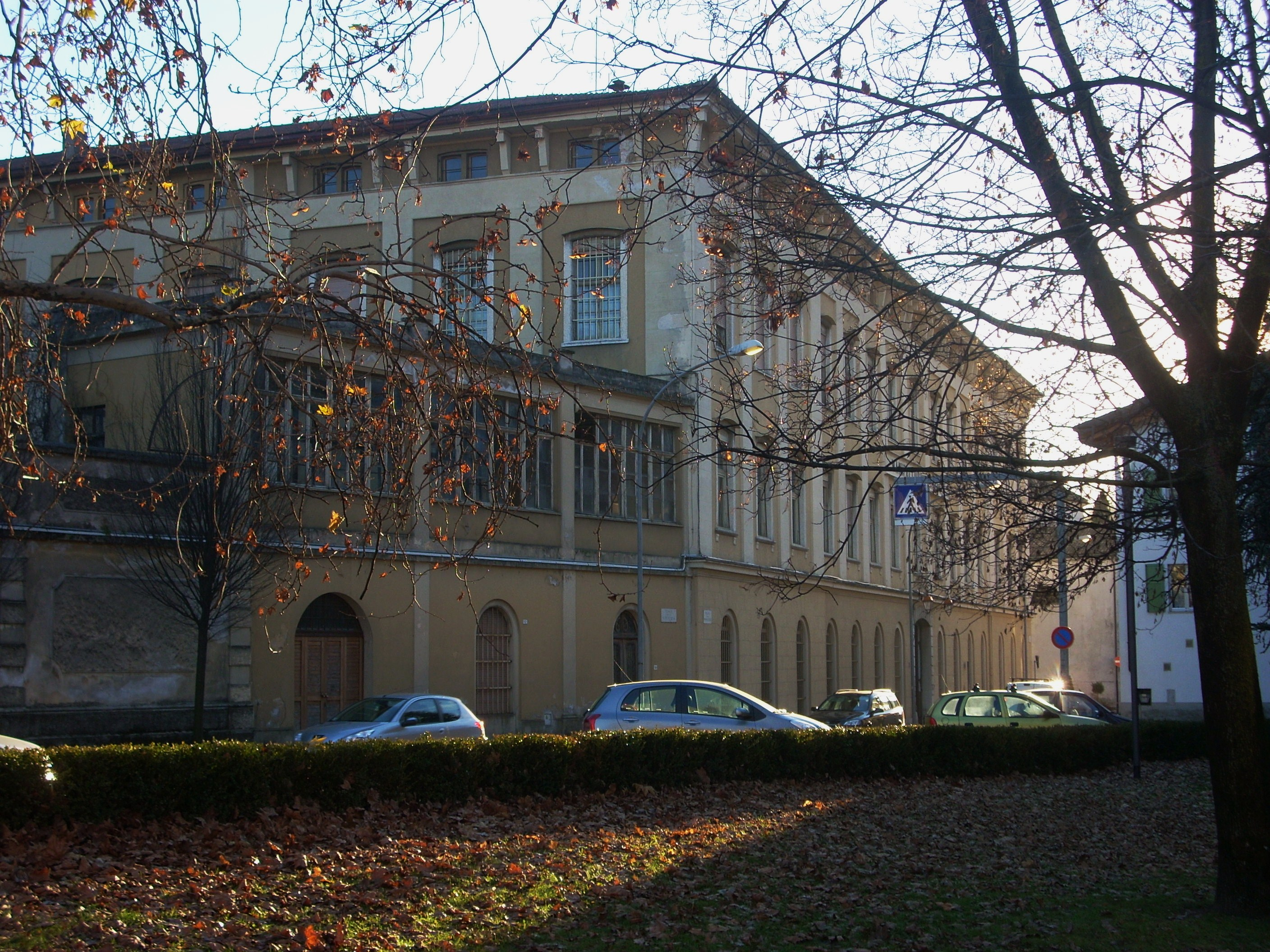
North side

The decision to build a tobacco factory in Borgo Sacco (a former city new incorporated into Rovereto, Province of Trento, Italy) began in the middle of the 1800s in the context of a high level of unemployment resulting from a crisis in the silk production sector. Borgo Sacco was situated in the middle of an area dedicated to tobacco cultivation. The cultivation and processing of tobacco had begun toward the end of the 1500s around so called "masere", a form of centralized farming. With the construction of the Borgo Sacco plant, the surrounding area of Vallagarina became strongly oriented to manufacturing.

On March 20, 1851, an agreement was signed between the Austrian Royal Ministry of Finance and the Municipality of Sacco headed by Antonio Gasperini. The total cost of the project was enormous: 175.000 crowns. Borgo Sacco provided the land and the materials, but even nearby Rovereto participated by donating 4,000 florins and potable water equivalent to 1,600 florins. The mechanical power needed to move the machines came from a water wheel moved by an underground water channel that passed through the factory.

The construction work on the Borgo Sacco Royal Tobacco Factory began in the same year. The factory was built on the plans of engineer Latzel of the Viena public works administration and the construction was directed by Giovanni Smith e Giovanni Rezzori.

== Start of production ==
The Manifattura began production in 1854–1855 with two laboratories of 220 workers each. Production began around four products: the Virginia cigar, sniffing tobacco, tobacco extract made from residues, and hand-rolled cigarettes (This was an experimental product that was quickly dropped).

Before the First World War (1914–1918) the cigar plan was one of the most important in Austria, especially renowned for its production of Virginia cigars. For several decades, the Manifattura Tabacchi was one of the most important industries in Trentino, with the highest employment capacity around. It was also a place of many social innovations, often begun by women workers who were in the majority. The first employer provided nursery was established, as well as an emergency loans bank. Even the first workers union was formed inside the walls of the Manifattura.

== World War I and after ==
During World War I, Manifattura Tabacchi was heavily damaged and production, including employees, was transferred to Austrian factories in Linz and in Bohemia. At the end of the war, Trentino province became part of Italy and Manifattura Tabacchi came under the direction of the state monopoly. When the factory reopened on March 19, 1919, all 1,400 workers who were in service before the conflict were rehired.

In the following years, production increased substantially thanks to gradual improvements to processes. This led to a drop in employment to around 700 in 1935 in contrast to nearly 2000 at the start of the century.

In the same years, the popularity of the Manifattura Tabacchi grew considerably thanks to promotional activities using the designs of Fortunato Depero, the celebrated artist from Rovereto.

== World War II and later changes ==
Throughout World War II, production continued despite bombings which did force production to the underground floor of the main building. Damage to the factory was not extensive. In 1948 a new expansion and modernization plan led the way to modern production methods. Cigar production was halted in 1953 and the factory was reoriented toward cigarettes. In the 1960s, tobacco production declined in Vallagarina, the area around Borgo Sacco and Rovereto. Previously it had been the source of about 70% of the tobacco used in production at Manifattura.

In 1969 Manifattura Tabacci began to produce for Philip Morris. The following year a new, highly mechanized production facility was opened in an area next to the old factory. The Borgo Sacco factory worked with 22 "Standard" machines made in the US and 13 cigarette packaging machines to produce 120 packets of cigarettes per minute. A tobacco chopping machine of that era made 1,200 cuts per minute. In the succeeding decade occupation stabilized at 700 employees. Progressive mechanization of production processes meant that men became the higher share of employees.

== Recent years ==
The relationship between Philip Morris and the State Monopoly continued until 2000 when Manifattura Tabacchi became property of the Ente Tabacchi Italiani (ETI, the national tobacco agency). ETI was founded in August 1998, but by 2000 became a private company. In 2003, as part of the privatized ETI, Manifattura Tabacchi of Borgo Sacco was sold to British Italian Tobacco, the Italian branch of British American Tobacco (BAT). Following loss of production quotas for Philip Morris, Manifattura Tabacchi continued to shed employees. In 1999 the factory had 270 workers, but by 2004, they were just 154.

Production stopped permanently on March 31, 2008, when BAT decided to concentrate production in Lecce, Italy, and chose to close Borgo Sacco's Manifattura Tabacchi. The main reason was that closing a factory in Trento would have had less negative impact with respect to closing a factory elsewhere.

== Redevelopment ==
The autonomous Province of Trento created Manifattura domani in 2009 to create and manage a clean technology hub. It is a private company held by Trentino Sviluppo, the economic development agency of the Province of Trento. The company set up Progetto Manifattura - Green Innovation Factory to transform the 9-hectare (22-acre) historic tobacco facility into a business, innovation and research hub for green building, renewable energy, and environmental technology.

== Bibliography ==
- Centenario della Manifattura tabacchi di Rovereto, Bologna, Tip. Baldazzi, 1955
- Operaie, serve, maestre, impiegate (a cura di P. Nava), Torino, Rosenberg & Sellier, 1992
- Per una storia della produzione del tabacco in Italia (a cura di A. Ciuffetti, R. Covino), in, “Proposte e ricerche. Economia e società nella storia dell'Italia centrale”, n. 61, anno XXXI, Ancona, Libreria Editrice Sapere Nuovo, estate/autunno 2008
- Storia del Trentino, vol. V L'età contemporanea. 1803-1918 (a cura di M. Garbari, A. Leonardi), Bologna, Il Mulino, 2005
- Storia del Trentino, vol. VI L'età contemporanea. Il Novecento (a cura di A. Leonardi, P. Pombeni), Bologna, Il Mulino, 2005
- A. Andreolli, La Manifattura Tabacchi di Borgo Sacco. Un itinerario tra il settore tabacchicolo del Trentino e l'archeologia industriale, tesi in Storia della tecnica, Corso di Laurea Triennale in Scienze storiche, Università di Bologna, a.a. 2009/2010, relatore prof. Giorgio Pedrocco
- F. Benedetti, F. Campolongo, G. Cattaneo, A. Cerbaro, D. Leoni, B. Manfrini, E. Zendri, Il ciclo del tabacco. La «Manifattura Tabacchi» (1854-1978): alle origini della classe operaia roveretana, in, “Classe. Quaderni sulla condizione e sulla lotta operaia”, n. 18, anno XI, Bari, Edizioni Dedalo, dicembre 1980, pp. 55–86
- F. Benedetti, F. Campolongo, G. Cattaneo, A. Cerbaro, D. Leoni, B. Manfrini, E. Zendri, La Manifattura Tabacchi: 1854-1978. Alle origini della classe operaia roveretana (anno scolastico 1977-78), in, Annali roveretani, Serie Strumenti, 3, Biblioteca Civica Girolamo Tartarotti of Rovereto, 2004, pp. 195–320
- A. Gerola, I 150 anni del Gigante. Storia della Manifattura Tabacchi di Rovereto attraverso immagini e testimonianze, Rovereto, Edizioni Osiride, 2004
- G. Pedrocco, Appunti per una storia della manifattura del tabacco in Italia fra XIX e XX secolo, in, “Studi e Notizie”, n. 8, Genova, CNR - Centro di studio sulla storia della tecnica, dicembre 1981, pp. 1–11
- G. Vetritto, La parabola di un'industria di Stato. Il monopolio dei tabacchi 1861-1997, Padova, Marsilio, 2005
