= Andrew Page (businessman) =

British businessman

- Born: 1963 or 1964 (age 61–62)
- Occupation: Businessman
- Known for: co-founder and chairman of Alfa Financial Software

Andrew Page (born 1963/1964) is a British businessman, and the co-founder and chairman of Alfa Financial Software.

In 1990, Page co-founded CHP Consulting, which was rebranded as Alfa Financial Software in November 2016.

Following the flotation of Alfa in May 2017, Page was expected to sell shares worth in excess of £180 million. In 2017, his net worth was estimated at £270 million.
