= Alpha Ridge, Alaska =

Mountain ridge in Denali Borough, Alaska, United States

Coordinates: 63°31′34″N 151°01′00″W

The Alpha Ridge is a mountain ridge in Denali Borough, Alaska, United States. Elevation: 3,420 feet.

It is on the west side of the Kantishna Valley in the Denali National Park
