= Alpha Diallo =

Alpha Diallo may refer to:

- Black M (born 1984), French rapper and singer-songwriter
- Alfa Ntiallo (born 1992), or Alpha Diallo, Guinean-Greek basketball player
- Alpha Diallo (basketball, born 1997), American basketball player
- Alpha Walid Diallo (1927–2000), Senegalese painter and illustrator
- Alpha Yaya Diallo, Guinean-born Canadian guitarist, singer and songwriter
