= Alpha (sternwheeler) =

Canadian wooden steamship

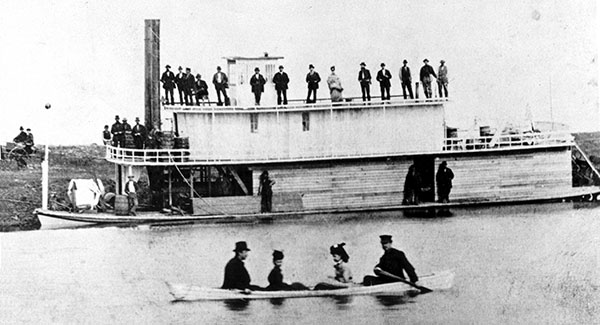
- The sternwheeler Alpha in 1878

History
- Name: Alpha
- Launched: July 5, 1873
- Fate: Ran aground April 1885

General characteristics
- Draft: 1 ft (0.30 m)

Alpha was a wooden steamship that operated on the rivers of Manitoba, Canada. She was launched on July 5, 1873. Her builder and first owner was J.W. "flatboat" McLane. His ownership was complicated by his British citizenship, since the Alpha would routinely have to cross the US-Canadian boundary while traveling from Grand Forks, Minnesota to Fort Garry, Manitoba. So, she was sold to the Kittison Line.

She had a reputation as being one of the fastest vessels in Manitoba, and one capable of proceeding during periods of shallow water, as her draft was just one foot (0.30 m).

Her accommodation was very cramped.

Running aground did not always end the career of prairie steamboats, but it did end the career of Alpha, when she ran aground on the Assiniboine River in April 1885.

Her grounding was due to human error. Her captain took a risk, during flood time. He risked taking a short-cut, by deviating from the river's channel and proceeding across an isthmus that he knew was dry land, during low water.

The wreck was left high and dry, when the flood passed. Locals cannibalized some of the ship's fitting and sound lumber. Silt from subsequent floods buried the wreck site, so the exact site was lost.

The wreck was re-exposed, in 1958, when that year's flood cut a new channel through the wreck-site. Her rudder is now housed in a maritime museum in Selkirk, Manitoba.
