= Alpha, Wisconsin =

- Unincorporated community
- Location within the state of Wisconsin
- Coordinates: 45°46′19″N 92°34′9″W
- Country: United States
- State: Wisconsin
- County: Burnett
- Town: Wood River
- Time zone: UTC-6 (Central (CST))
  - Summer (DST): UTC-5 (CDT)
- Area codes: 715 & 534

Alpha is an unincorporated community in the town of Wood River, Burnett County, Wisconsin, United States. The community is located in the western part of the county, in northwestern Wisconsin. There are fewer than a dozen households in the community.

== History ==
Alpha was settled primarily by Scandinavian immigrants from the Småland District of Sweden. The community was originally called Småland Prairie, a name rejected by the United States Postmaster General. The town's postmaster, also the local buttermaker, at a loss to come up with a better name, simply filled in the name of his Alpha brand cream separator.

The postmaster's butter business eventually became the Burnett Dairy Co-op. Early on, it processed so much milk that the excess whey turned the stream a creamy color; thus the stream's name, Buttermilk Creek.

The Alpha Store survived long after most general stores had closed. The business was owned through most of its years by the Anderson family. Gordon Anderson, the last owner of the store, sold everything from shoes to groceries to television sets. The building is now home to a small engine repair shop.

== Geography ==
The nearest major metropolitan area is Minneapolis/St. Paul, located approximately 70 miles to the south-southwest. Alpha is situated on Highway 70, 5 miles east of Grantsburg and 10 miles west of Siren.

Alpha is surrounded by flat, fertile farmland. Buttermilk Creek passes through town, running alongside the highway until it joins the Wood River about one mile west of town. The stream is small enough to jump across, though it rarely runs dry, even in the height of summer. It drains a sizeable shallow wetland to the east of town, known as the Falun Meadows.

== Business and industry ==
The largest employer in Alpha is the Burnett Dairy Co-op, which produces string cheese. Attached to the cheese factory is a retail outlet that sells dairy products, groceries, and souvenirs. The Co-op also includes a feed mill, with an attached hardware store. A small engine shop is located in the former general store.

Alpha has a bed and breakfast, an Evangelical Covenant Church, and the Wood River Town Hall.

Alpha formerly had an elementary school operated by the Grantsburg School District, but was shut down in 2024.
