= Alpha value =

Alpha value (designated α value) may refer to:

- Significance level in statistics
- Alpha compositing
