= Sarah Angliss =

British composer and musician

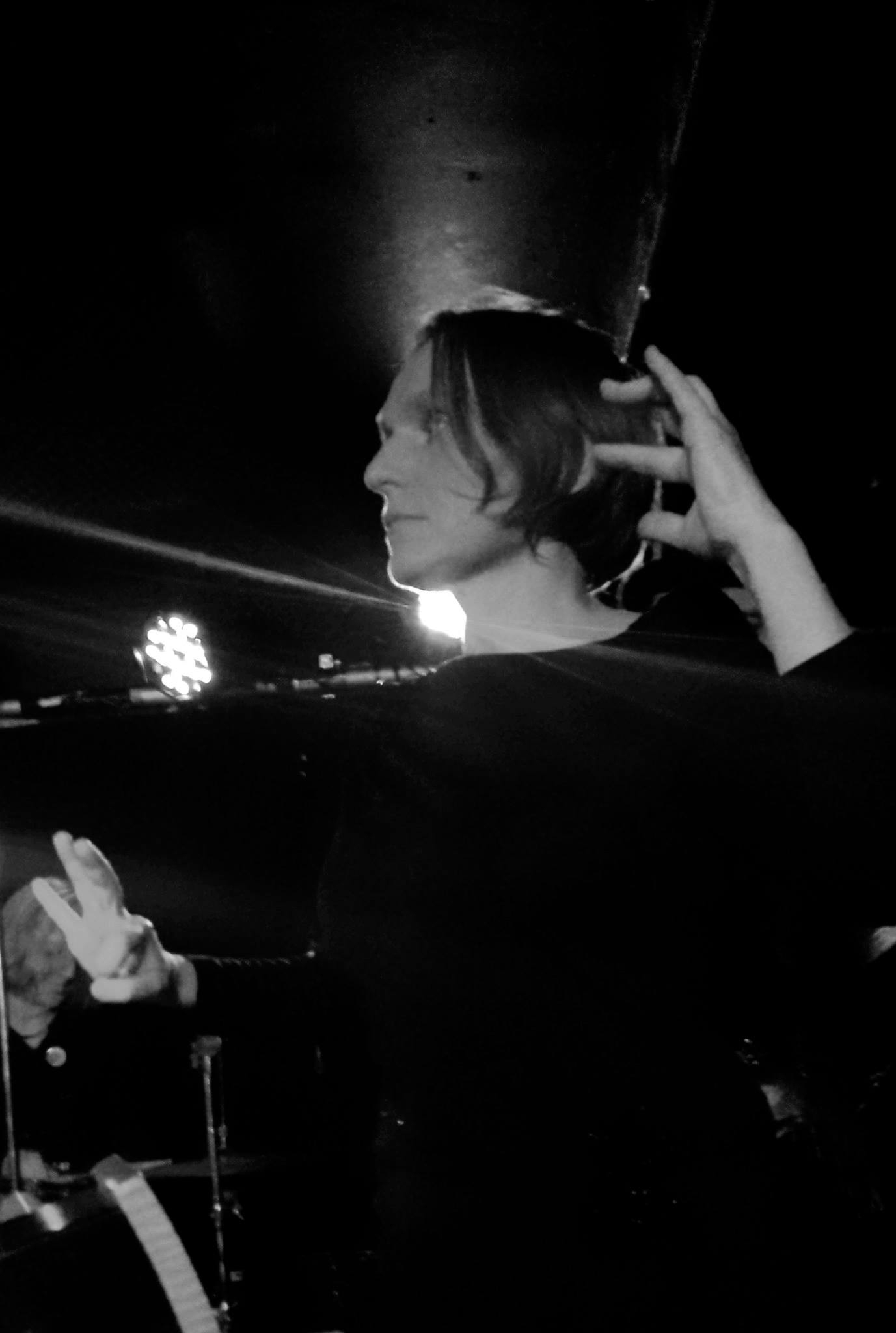
- Angliss on theremin in 2014

Background information
- Born: Watford, UK
- Genres: Film score; opera; theatre music; electroacoustic music; contemporary classical; sound design; sound art
- Occupations: Composer; sound designer; experimental instrument maker; musician
- Instruments: theremin; clavisimbalum; recorder; Max; robotic carillon
- Website: www.sarahangliss.com

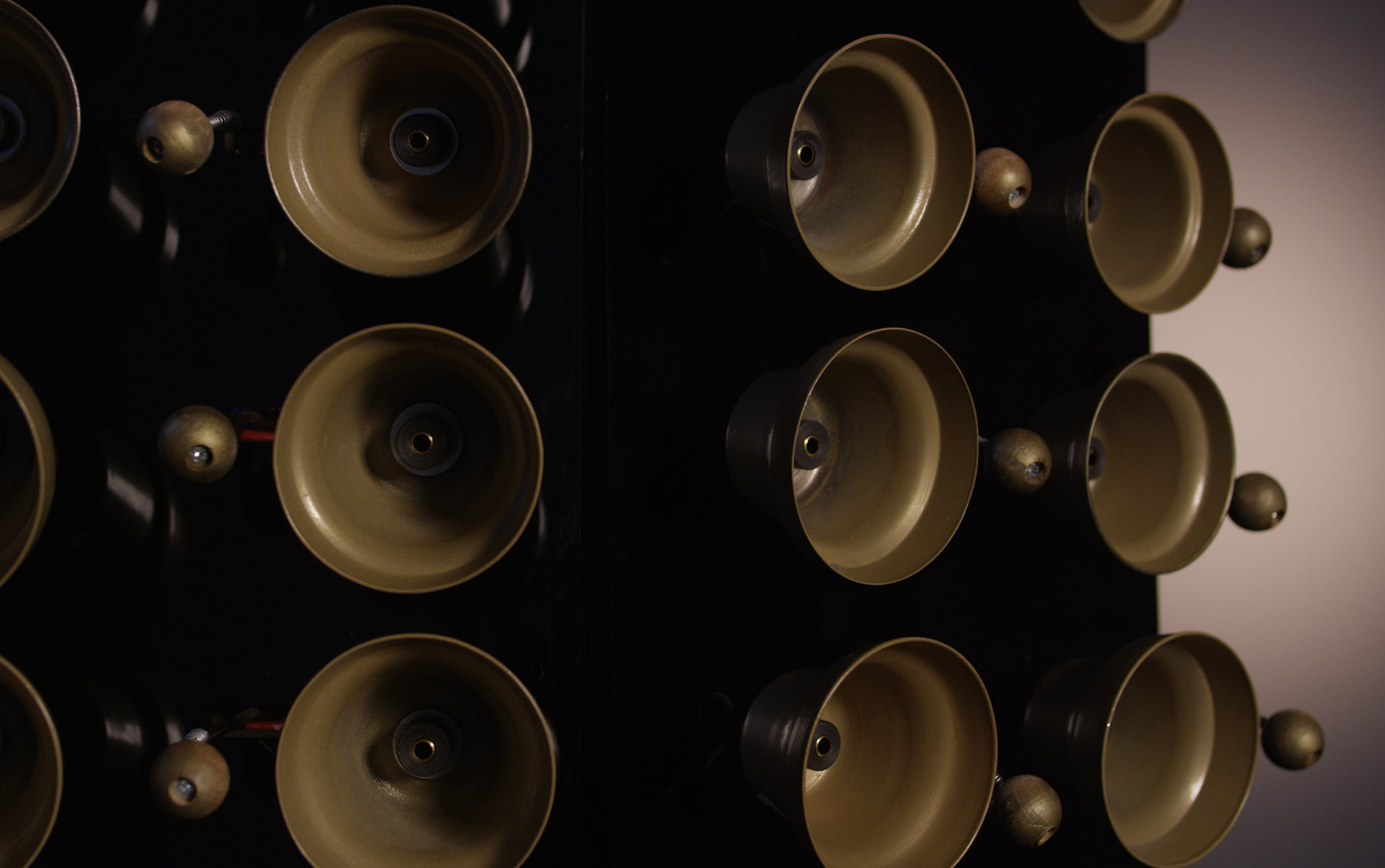
The Ealing Feeder - robotic, polyphonic carillon designed and built by Sarah Angliss

Sarah Angliss is a composer, sound designer, producer and performer based in London, England. She creates new music and soundworlds for film, theatre, opera and the concert stage, including her own live performances. Angliss's music uses voices, orchestral and ancient instruments, augmented with Max, electronics and her own hand-built robotic music machines. Angliss is also a professional thereminist and woodwind player and applies her own extended and electronic techniques to various instruments. In November 2018 she received a Composer's Award from the Paul Hamlyn Foundation and on 8 December 2021 she received an Ivor Novello Award (category: Visionary Award). The Ivors Committee commented she “stays true to her artistic concepts, to create unique compositions that connect to the listener with emotional depth and great beauty, never failing to leave a lasting impression.”. Her opera Giant opened in Aldeburgh Festival 7 June 2023 and transferred to The Linbury Theatre, Royal Opera House 6 March 2024.

Alongside her performance, Angliss researches the history of sound culture, presenting topics in print, national radio and at salon talks throughout Europe. Much of this research informs her compositions.

== Biography ==
Angliss studied composition and baroque and renaissance music as well as Electroacoustics (in the Acoustics Department of the University of Salford). She also has a Masters in Evolutionary and Adaptive Systems (University of Sussex) - this included the study of artificial life, machine learning and robotics. She began extemporising and performing live as a teenager in UK folk clubs - English folksong is evident in many of her electroacoustic compositions (e.g. Wan, on Air Loom, 2019). Angliss now performs live throughout Europe with human co-performers (chiefly percussionist Stephen Hiscock) and musical automata, machines she has devised and built since 2005 to "give her performance an arresting and uncanny physical presence."

Angliss composed an electroacoustic score for Romola Garai's feature film Amulet (2020). This contained horror film was selected for the Midnight programme of Sundance 2020. Angliss's score makes extensive use of female voices and electronics, as well as her robotic carillon (The Ealing Feeder), viola da gamba and augmented, contrabass recorder.

Working as a theatre composer, Angliss has created music and sounds which blur the line between sound design and music for a number of theatrical works including Eugene O'Neill's expressionist play The Hairy Ape at The Old Vic, London and Park Avenue Armory in New York; Anne Washburn's stage adaptation of CBS cult TV series The Twilight Zone (the world's first official stage production of this series) at the Almeida and in the West End ("I’m trying to make sound that gets under your skin"); Lucy Prebble's The Effect at the National Theatre (Cottesloe); and (Moss Hart and George S. Kaufman's) Once in a Lifetime at the Young Vic.

Angliss has written and presented the radio shows The Bird Fancyer's Delight (about the ancient practice of teaching birds human tunes to bring fashionable music into the home) and Echo in a Bottle (a cultural history of the echo - for the Pursuit of Beauty series) for BBC Radio 4. In April 2017 Angliss released her solo album Ealing Feeder, described as 'a subtle gem' and a 'shimmering minimalist masterpiece' by Robert Barry writing in The Wire and the "most inventive album I've heard in a long while" by Simon Reynolds writing in 4 Columns, New York. This was followed in March 2019 by Air Loom which Sarah performed on UK tour that year with singer Sarah Gabriel and percussionist Stephen Hiscock.

In 2002–2003, Angliss initiated and led Infrasonic (aka Soundless Music) - an experiment to explore the strange psychological effects of airborne infrasound (sound below 20 Hz). Angliss noted infrasound is used in sacred organ music to create a sense of awe - it is emitted by bass pipes over 28 feet (8.5 m) long. In 1998 physicist Vic Tandy showed infrasound (from mundane sources) could be causing a sense of unease in a room - feelings that could lead someone to feel they have been haunted. Angliss worked with parapsychologists Professor Richard Wiseman and Dr Ciarán O'Keeffe, pianist GéNIA and Dr Richard Lord and Dan Simmonds from the National Physical Laboratory to investigate infrasound's effect in a musical setting. Their aim was to find out if infrasound could generate a sense of unease or other strange feelings when it is placed within music - feelings that might be akin to those experienced in ostensibly haunted sites. The team worked in Liverpool Metropolitan Cathedral, then two counterbalanced, experimental concerts in the Purcell Room, London. While audible music played, they flooded each venue with sine waves around 17.4 Hz. The parapsychologists used questionnaires to log the audience's responses at various points in each show (the audience were not told when the infrasound would be occurring) and found tentative evidence that the infrasound created a sense of unease in listeners, even if they were unaware of its presence. Angliss composed music for the experiment and has subsequently used masked infrasound in later compositions, including the score for Lucy Prebble's The Effect, National Theatre.

Angliss wrote a short biography of Daphne Oram for the republication of Oram's treatise on sound and electronics An Individual Note. This was funded by a crowdfunding campaign organised by the Oram Trust in 2016.

Angliss was a resident artist at Limehouse Town Hall and a visiting research fellow at the Sound Practice Research Unit, Goldsmiths.

In 2017, Angliss re-edited the original sound track of Sony-CBS TV series The Twilight Zone, for a new stage adaptation by Anne Washburn (directed by Richard Jones, at the Almeida, London). This included working with the compositions of Bernard Herrmann, Marius Constant, Nathan van Cleave, Fred Steiner and others. This included the creation of new music and sonic effects that blended with the original orchestral material.

In October 2018, Angliss began writing a chamber opera, Giant, supported by a Jerwood Opera Writing Fellowship and Snape Music (now Britten Pears Arts). Giant tells the story of the Charles Byrne, known as The Irish Giant, who lived in fear that his remains would go on public display, against his wishes. The piece blends voices with viola da gamba, clavicymbalum and electronics.
