= ALFA (band) =

Burmese boy band

- Origin: Myanmar
- Genres: Burmese pop
- Years active: 2019–present
- Labels: JBJ Entertainment
- Members: Jay; Adam; T Tant; Kinice; Min Khant
- Past members: Kira; Bo Bo
- Website: ALFA on Facebook

ALFA is a Myanmar Pop boy band formed by JBJ entertainment in 2019. The group has been strongly influenced by the Korean wave and popularity of K-pop following myanmar. ALFA has built up a strong local following in Yangon, Myanmar's commercial capgroup The Group is originally a seven-piece group, Kira & Bo Bo left the group in October 31, 2021.

The group debuted on 12 December 2019 with the single, "One N Only." The group's members were selected by an entertainment company, JBJ Entertainment, which held open auditions the previous year in Yangon. Two members, Jay and Adam were contestants in Galaxy Star, a singing competition organized by JBJ in 2017. ALFA's fan base is dubbed the ALFAVERSE.

== Members ==
- Jay (ဇေလင်းထိုက်)
- Adam (ဟိန်းဦးလွင်)
- T Tant (တည်တံ့အောင်)
- Kinice (ဟိန်းမင်းထိုက်)
- Min Khant (မင်းခန့်ကျော်)

== See also ==
- Project K
- Music of Burma
