= Flugschule Wings Alfa =

Alfa

General information
- Type: Hang glider
- National origin: Austria
- Manufacturer: Flugschule Wings
- Designer: Norberd Brodnik
- Status: Production completed

The Flugschule Wings Alfa (English: Wings Flying School Alpha) is an Austrian high-wing, single-place, hang glider that was designed and produced by Flugschule Wings, a flying school based in Spital am Pyhrn.

== Design and development ==
The Alpha was developed by Flugschule Wings as a training glider for their own use and also for sale. The resulting design is a simple, single surface wing that was DHV certified in the "1-2" classification. The aircraft was available in 2003, but now appears to be out of production.

The aircraft is made from aluminum tubing, with the single surface wing covered in Dacron sailcloth. Its 9.8 m (32.2 ft) span wing is cable braced and has an aspect ratio of 6.0:1. The rated pilot hook-in weight is 60 to 95 kg (132 to 209 lb).

The Alfa is also certified for powered harnesses to allow it to fly as a powered hang glider.

== Specifications (Alfa) ==
Data from Bertrand

General characteristics

- Crew: one
- Wingspan: 9.8 m (32 ft 2 in)
- Wing area: 15.8 m^{2} (170 sq ft)
- Aspect ratio: 6.0:1
