= Alpha, Oregon =

Unincorporated community in the state of Oregon, United States

Coordinates: 44°09′51″N 123°42′02″W

Alpha is an unincorporated community in Lane County, in the U.S. state of Oregon.

== History ==
A post office was established at Alpha in 1890, and remained in operation until it was discontinued in 1940. The community was named for Alpha Lundey, a local girl.

== See also ==
- Deadwood, Oregon, for information about Alpha Farm, named for the former post office
