= Alfa Financial Software =

British financial software company

- Type: Public
- Traded as: LSE: ALFA
- ISIN: GB00BDHXPG30
- Industry: Information Technology
- Founded: 1990
- Headquarters: London, United Kingdom
- Key people: Andrew Page (Chairman); Andrew Denton (CEO)
- Products: Software
- Revenue: ▲£126.7 million (2025)
- Operating income: ▲£40.1 million (2025)
- Net income: ▲£30.1 million (2025)
- Website: www.alfasystems.com

Alfa Financial Software Holdings plc (trading as Alfa) is a UK-based software provider that develops a cloud-based platform solution for the automotive, equipment and asset finance industries. Founded in 1990, it is listed on the London Stock Exchange and is a constituent of the FTSE 250 Index.

Its core product, Alfa Systems, supports originations, servicing and collections, and is available as an integrated point solution, a preconfigured implementation or a comprehensive platform.

== History ==
The company was founded by Justin Cooper, Ian Hargrave and Andrew Page as CHP Consulting in 1990 and began serving its first customer in 1992.

In 2016, the company rebranded to Alfa to reflect its core product, and Andrew Denton was appointed as CEO.

In May 2017, Alfa was listed on the London Stock Exchange following its initial public offering at 325p per share.

Following a quarterly index review, Alfa entered the FTSE 250 Index in September 2017.

Alfa Systems 6, the latest version of Alfa Systems, was launched in 2024.

In 2025, it expanded Alfa Start, to support the European equipment market.
