= Birth (journal) =

- Discipline: Nursing, obstetrics and gynecology
- Language: English
- Edited by: Melissa Cheyney

Publication details
- Former name(s): Birth and the Family Journal
- History: 1973-present
- Publisher: John Wiley & Sons
- Frequency: Quarterly
- Impact factor: 3.689 (2020)

Standard abbreviations
- ISO 4: Birth

Indexing
- ISSN: 0730-7659 (print); 1523-536X (web)
- LCCN: 82642864
- OCLC no.: 900950990

Links
- Journal homepage; Online access; Online archive

Birth is a quarterly peer-reviewed medical journal covering research on childbirth and related topics. It was established in 1973 as Birth and the Family Journal, with as its founding editor-in-chief Madeleine H. Shearer, obtaining its current name in 1982. It is published by John Wiley & Sons and the editor-in-chief is Melissa Cheyney.

== Abstracting and indexing ==
The journal is abstracted and indexed in:

- CAB Abstracts
- CINAHL
- Current Contents/Clinical Medicine
- Current Contents/Social & Behavioral Sciences
- EBSCO databases
- Index Medicus/MEDLINE/PubMed
- ProQuest databases
- PsycINFO
- Science Citation Index Expanded
- Scopus
- Social Sciences Citation Index

According to the Journal Citation Reports, the journal has a 2020 impact factor of 3.689.
