= Alpha, Ohio =

Unincorporated community in Ohio, U.S.

Coordinates: 39°42′42″N 84°01′24″W

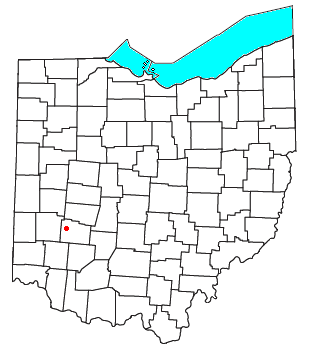
Location of Alpha, Ohio

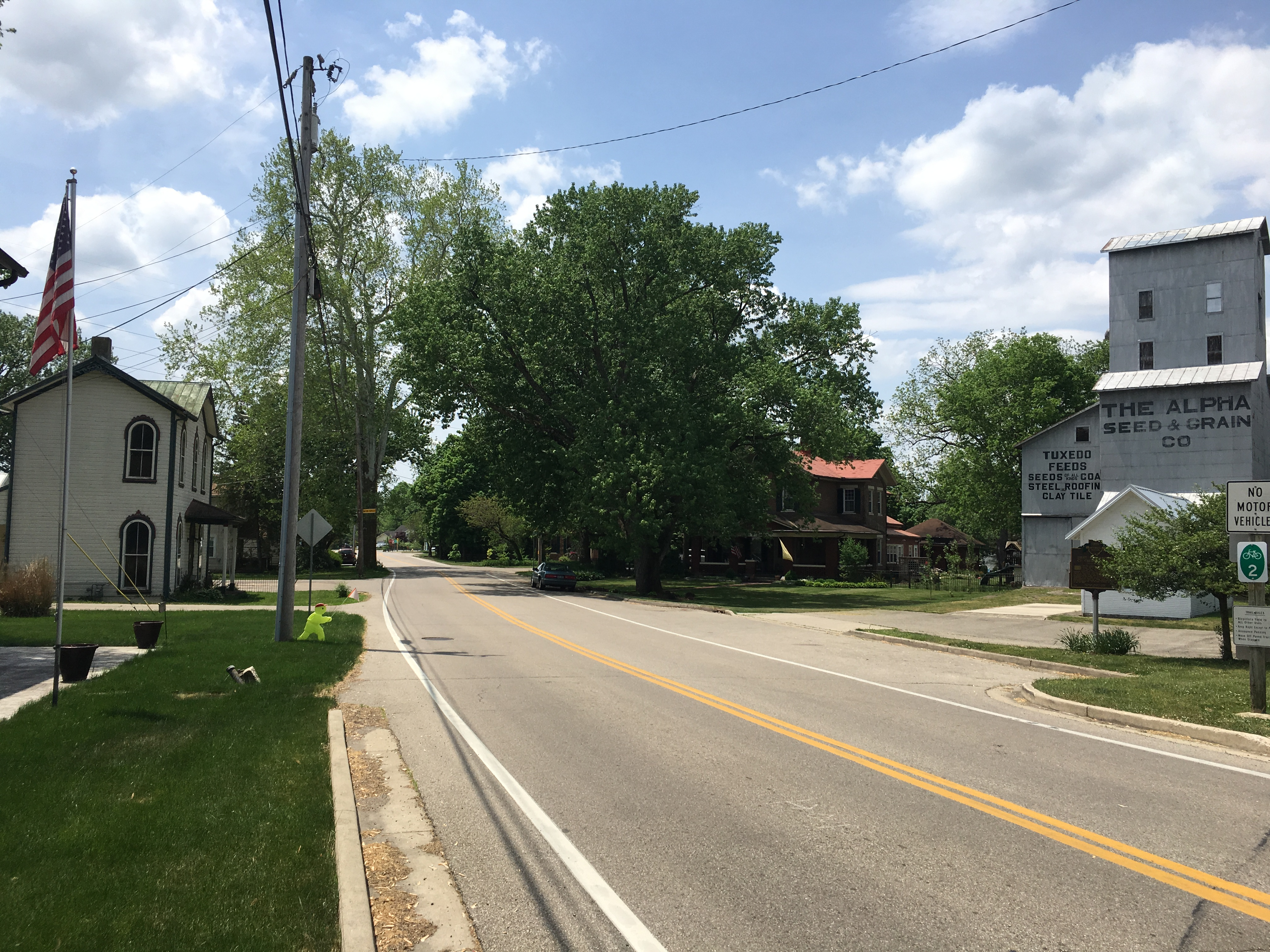
Alpha, Ohio looking southwest on Alpha Road, May 2018

Alpha is an unincorporated community in Greene County, Ohio, in the United States. It is located on the eastern side of the Dayton metropolitan area. A post office is located in Alpha, with the ZIP code of 45301.

A post office called Alpha has been in operation since 1850. The community is one of the oldest in the area. Alpha was named for the first letter of the Greek alphabet because it was at, or on the site of, the first mill in the county.

It was the location of a Pittsburgh, Cincinnati, Chicago and St. Louis Railroad railway station stop, of a railway that has been shut down and turned into a bike path.

Alpha has also been known in the past as Harbine or Harbines.
