= Alfa (cigarette) =

Former Italian cigarette brand

- Product type: Cigarette
- Current owner: British American Tobacco
- Produced by: BAT Italia; Japan Tobacco
- Country: Italy
- Introduced: 1940s
- Discontinued: 2014; 12 years ago
- Markets: See Markets
- Previous owners: Ente Tabacchi Italiani

Alfa was an Italian brand of cigarettes, owned by multinational corporation British American Tobacco. The brand was manufactured by its local subsidiary, BAT Italia, until it was discontinued in 2014. In Japan, Alfa is still being manufactured by Japan Tobacco.

== History ==
Italian pack of Alfa

Alfa was launched in the 1940s by Ente Tabacchi Italiani. Alfa used a dark and low-grade tobacco, often containing dust or pieces of wood, high in tar. In the period in which "Nazionali Semplici" ("Nationals without filter") were difficult to find as part of the "Mobile Scale Basket" established by the Italian government, Alfa became a popular alternative, despite its lower quality.

As with similar brands such Super and Nazionali, short size Alfa packs were eventually discontinued, with their production replaced by longer "king size" packs in the 1990s.

In March 1991, La Repubblica reported that the tar and nicotine content of Italian cigarette brands, including Alfa, were to be lowered by the Italian government. From 31 December 1992, cigarettes could contain no more than 15 mg of tar. The amount of tar was lowered again to 12 mg on 31 December 1997. Alfa cigarettes at the time contained 18 mg of tar.

In 2003, the Italian Ministry of Economy and Finance published a list of cigarette brands that were required to lower their tar and nicotine content. Alfa was required to lower its tar and nicotine levels from 11.5 mg tar and 0.95 mg nicotine in 2002 to 10.0 mg tar and 0.90 mg nicotine in 2003.

In May 2014, a decision was made by the Italian Tobacco Board to discontinue the Alfa brand, with production ceasing later that year.

== Branding ==
The golden lion with a shield, introduced at the end of the 1970s to gradually replace the original logo of a sailing ship, represents the old symbol of the Italian "Monopoli di Stato" ("State Monopoly"), the national tobacco industry. The white triangle on a red background with the red Greek "Alfa" ("Alpha") painted on a white package was the brand's symbol from the 1970s.

== Markets ==
Historically, Alfa was mainly sold in Italy, but was (and in some cases is still) sold in countries such as Switzerland, Bosnia and Herzegovina, Bulgaria, Ukraine and Japan.

== See also ==
- Tobacco smoking
