= Alpha Nyan =

Norwegian footballer (born 1978)

Personal information
- Date of birth: 19 June 1978 (age 48)
- Position: Midfielder

Youth career
- Strømsgodset

Senior career*
Years	Team	Apps	(Gls)
1996–1997	Strømsgodset		
1997	→ Drafn (loan)		
1998–1999	Drafn		
2000–2001	Strømsgodset		
2002	Grindvoll		
2002	Larvik		
2003–2004	Birkebeineren		
2005	Strømsgodset	4	(0)
2006	Manglerud Star		
2007–2008	Drammens BK		
2009–2011	Svelvik		
2011–2013	Drammens BK		
2014	Drafn		
2015	Skiold		

Managerial career
- 2009–2011: Svelvik (player-coach)
- 2012–2013: Drammens BK (player-coach)
- * Club domestic league appearances and goals

Alpha Nyan (born 19 June 1978) is a retired Norwegian football midfielder.

He grew up in the club Strømsgodset IF and was fielded as a substitute in the 1996 cup quarter-final. In 1997 he made his Eliteserien debut. He was seen as surplus, but after a period in neighbouring minnows SK Drafn he rejoined Strømsgodset in 2000, playing most games in the 2000 1. divisjon. However he only got 2 games in 2001 Tippeligaen and joined Grindvoll IL in 2002. After a miserable start in the 2002 2. divisjon he went on to Larvik Fotball in mid-season. He then played two seasons for IF Birkebeineren.

In 2005, he joined Strømsgodset for a third stint. He only got 4 games in the 2005 1. divisjon, and joined another second-tier club Manglerud Star.

In 2007 he went to fifth-tier Drammens BK where he also was employed as youth coach. In 2009 he became player-coach, this time on the senior level, in fourth-tier Svelvik IF. After that he continued for various Drammen-based clubs.
