= Construction (disambiguation) =

Construction is the process of producing buildings and other infrastructure.

Construction also may refer to:

- Compass and straightedge construction, in geometry
- Construction and Local Government Journal, weekly publication
- Construction (Cage), music by John Cage
- Construction (Egyptian coalition), Egyptian political coalition
- Grammatical construction, meaning-bearing relationship among words of an utterance
- Offshore construction, structures in a marine environment
- On Construction (Latin: De Constructione), books XVII & XVIII of Priscian's Institutions of Grammar
- Social construction, social factors in construing of language and other symbols
- Software construction, creating software
- Statutory construction, interpretation of legal statute

== See also ==
- Construal
- Construct (disambiguation)
- Constructionism (disambiguation)
- Constructivism (disambiguation)
- Constructor (disambiguation)
- Index of construction articles
- List of algebraic constructions
- Reconstruction (disambiguation)
