= Assembly =

Assembly may refer to:

== Organisations and meetings ==
- Deliberative assembly, a gathering of members who use parliamentary procedure for making decisions
- General assembly, an official meeting of the members of an organization or of their representatives
- House of Assembly, a name given to the legislature or lower house of a bicameral legislature
- National Assembly, either a legislature or the lower house of a bicameral legislature in some countries
  - National Assembly (disambiguation)
- Popular assembly, a localized citizen gathering to address issues of importance to the community
- Qahal, or assembly, an Israelite organizational structure
- People's Assembly (disambiguation)
- Assembly of Experts, the deliberative body empowered to designate and dismiss the Supreme Leader of Iran
- Freedom of assembly, the individual right to come together and collectively express, promote, pursue and defend common interests
- School assembly, a gathering of all or part of a school
- Self-organization, social organization arising from individual and local interactions

== Science, technology and manufacturing ==
- Assembly, the act of combining components in manufacturing, or the resulting assemblage
- Assembly modelling, technology and methods used by computer-aided design and product visualization software
- Assembly line, a manufacturing process in which parts are added to a product in a sequential manner
- Self-assembly, a process in which disordered components form an organized structure without external direction
- Sequence assembly, a process to reconstruct a long DNA sequence from numerous fragments
- Assembly rules, set of controversial rules in ecology proposed by Jared Diamond to explain species community composition
- Assembly of a virion (Virology)
- Design for assembly, approach to design

=== Computing ===
- Assembly language, a programming language providing symbolic representation of machine code
- Assembly (programming), a runtime unit of types and resources with the same version
- Assembly (CLI), an XML wrapper around a compiled code library (the XML-wrapped-library itself is also sometimes referred to as an assembly) used for deployment, versioning, and security
- Assembly (demo party), an annual computer event in Finland

== Arts and entertainment ==
- Assemble (collective), a London-based collective active in art, architecture and design
- Assembly (events promoter), one of the main programmers at the Edinburgh Festival Fringe
- Assembly (film), a 2007 Chinese war drama
- Assembly (TV series), a 2015 television series
- Assembly (novel), 2021 novel by Natasha Brown
- The Assembly (Australian TV series), an Australian television talk show which premiered in 2024
- The Assembly (British TV series), a British television talk show which premiered in 2024
- The Assembly (Canadian TV series), a Canadian television talk show which premiered in 2025

=== Music ===
- Assemble (album), an album by Grown at Home
- Assembly (bugle call), a call used to bring in a group of soldiers
- Assembly (John Foxx album), 1992
- Assembly (Theatre of Tragedy album)
- The Assembly, a synth pop project started in 1983
- Assembly, a 2021 compilation album by Joe Strummer

== Other uses ==
- Assembly station, a rapid transit station in Boston, Massachusetts, US
- Assembly Bristol, an office block in England, UK

== See also ==
- Assemble (disambiguation)
- Assembler (disambiguation)
- Assembly Member (disambiguation)
- Asse
- Brice Assie
- Assi (disambiguation)
- Hassy
