= Bovril, Argentina =

Coordinates: 31°21′S 59°26′W

Bovril
- Municipality and village
- Interactive map of Bovril
- Country: Argentina
- Province: Entre Ríos
- Department: La Paz
- Founded: 1913
- Elevation: 80 m (260 ft)

Population (2001)
  - Total: 7,977
- Municipality
- Time zone: UTC−3 (ART)
- Postal code: E3142
- Website: http://www.bovril.gob.ar

Bovril is a village and municipality in La Paz Department in the north-west of Entre Ríos Province in north-eastern Argentina.

The locality is connected by 6 km of paved road with National Route 127. It was formerly served by a railway station, Estación Bovril, on the General Urquiza Railway network.

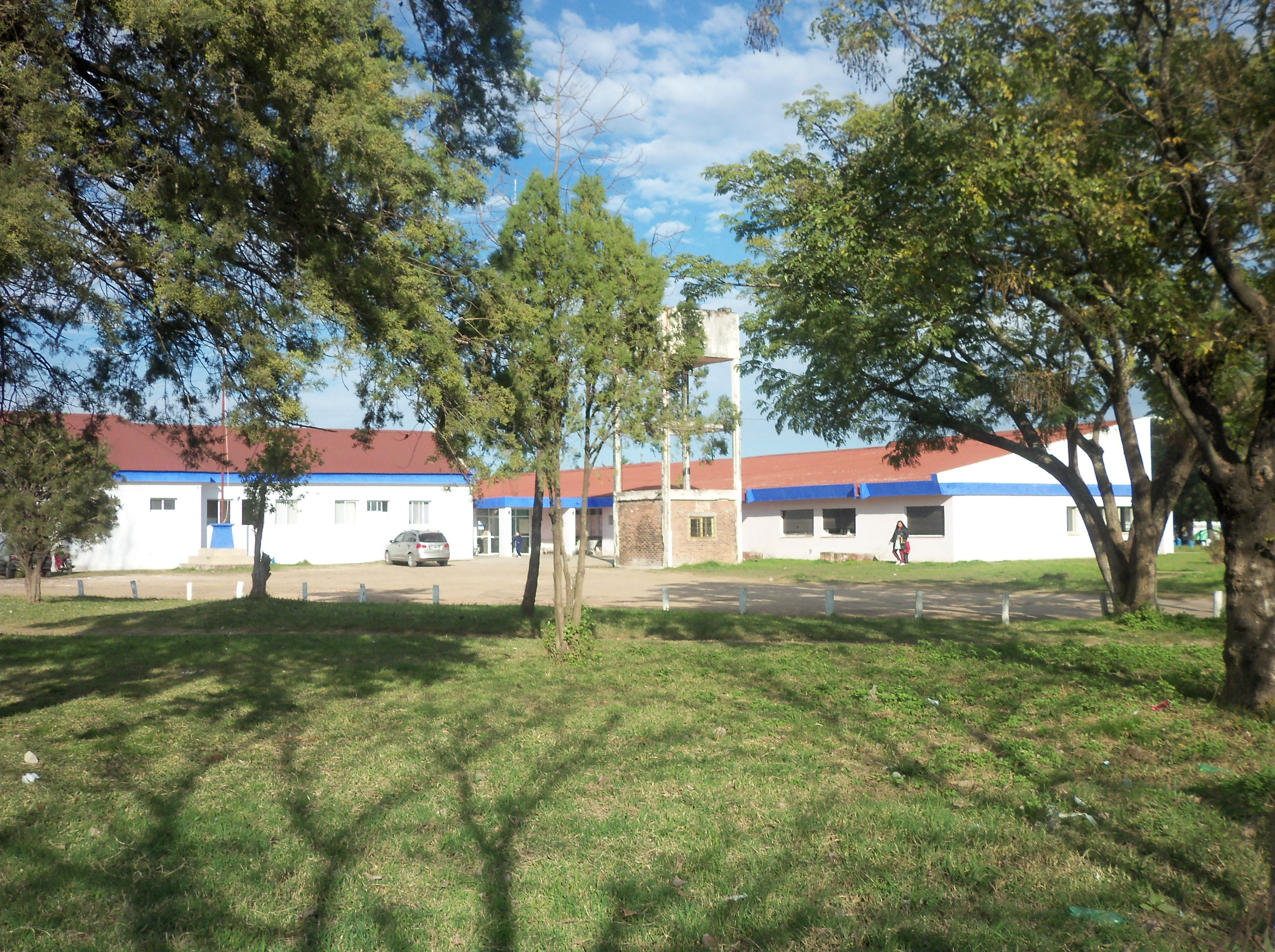
San Miguel Hospital, Bovril

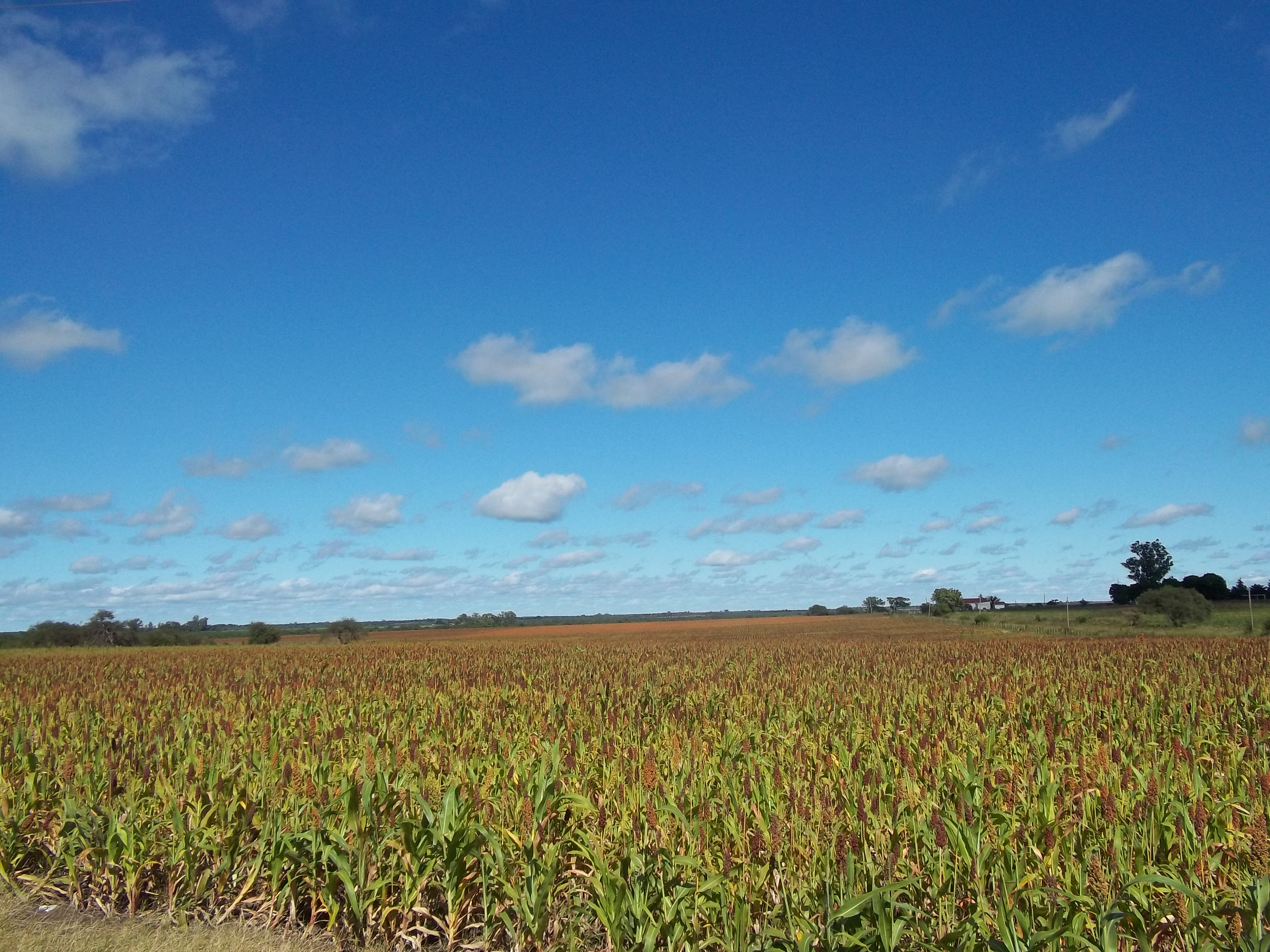
Field of sorghum near Bovril

== History ==
The planned village, "Colonia y Pueblo Bovril", was founded in 1913 by the Bovril Company, British makers of the beef extract Bovril, to accommodate workers at the meat processing plant at Santa Elena and on the railway. The company owned large tracts of cattle-rearing land in the area until 1973. Substantial numbers of Volga Germans settled in the area. The municipality of Bovril was constituted in 1951.

== Festivals ==
The annual Fiesta Nacional del Gurí Entrerriano is attended by boys from all over Entre Ríos province, who take part in artistic activities, folk dance and sporting contests.

The Festival Montielero, founded in 2004, features Indigenous culture.

== Notable people from Bovril ==
- Gabriel Graciani, footballer
- Augusto Vandor, trade union leader
