= Gabriel Graciani =

Gabriel Graciani may refer to:

- Gabriel Graciani (footballer, born 1982), Argentine defender for Patronato
- Gabriel Graciani (footballer, born 1993), Argentine defender for San Martín
