= Assemble =

Assemble or Assembled may refer to:

- Assemble (album), 2005 album by Grown at Home
- Assemble (EP), 2023 EP by tripleS
- Assemble (collective), collective of people based in London
- Marvel Studios: Assembled, American television series of documentary specials

== See also ==
- Assembly (disambiguation)
- Assembler (disambiguation)
- Avengers Assemble (disambiguation)
