= Janet Nathan =

British sculptor and relief artist

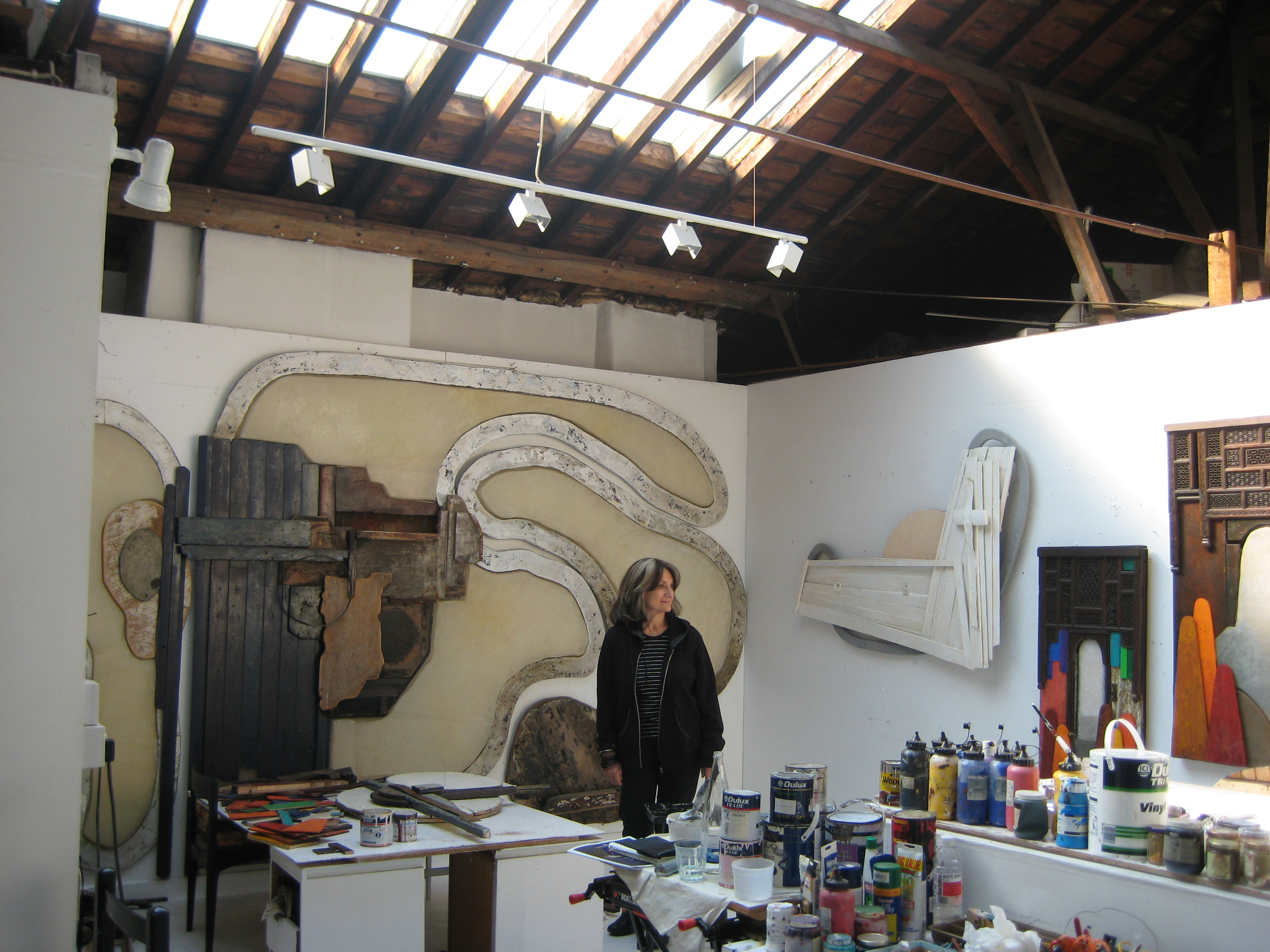
- Nathan in her London studio, c. 2000s
- Born: c. 1938; London, England
- Died: 4 July 2020; London, England
- Resting place: Highgate Cemetery
- Education: St Martin's School of Art
- Years active: 1970s—2010s
- Known for: Constructed and painted relief works
- Notable work: In the Tate permanent collection: Zeloso (1979); Near Paros (1985)
- Style: Relief construction; abstraction
- Movement: British constructionism; The London Group
- Spouse: Patrick Caulfield (m. 1999; died 2005)
- Children: 3 (prev. marriage)

Janet Nathan (1938–2020) was a British visual artist known for her constructed and painted relief works made from wood, resin, board and found materials. Emerging in the late 1970s, she developed a distinctive sculptural language combining abstraction, material memory and maritime references. Nathan was a long-standing member of The London Group.

Nathan exhibited widely across the United Kingdom, including at the Institute of Contemporary Arts (ICA), Ikon Gallery, the Whitechapel Open and The British Art Show (1980); and her work appeared regularly in the Royal Academy Summer Exhibition from 1980. Works by Nathan are represented in major public collections, including the Tate, the Arts Council Collection, the British Council, Walker Art Gallery, Liverpool, the British Academy, Leicestershire Education Authority, and the Chelsea and Westminster Hospital.

== Biography ==
Nathan was born in London in 1938. She studied painting at St Martin's School of Art, where she developed an early interest in modular composition, colour and relief construction. She studied under the painter Frederick Gore CBE RA.

According to The Barnet Press, Nathan’s first solo exhibition at the Nicholas Treadwell Gallery in 1973 sold well, and that Princess Margaret and Lord Snowdon purchased four works. A contemporaneous exhibition booklet from the Nicholas Treadwell Gallery documented her growing recognition among London collectors.

== Wapping studio (c. 1975–1985) ==
In the mid-1970s, Nathan established a studio at 82 Wapping Wall (Space Studios) on the River Thames, working and exhibiting there until around 1985. The location marked a shift in her practice from canvas painting to constructing mixed-media wall reliefs using found foreshore materials, including timber flotsam, sand, rusted metal, and resin.

During her time at Wapping, Nathan was selected by art critic William Packer for The British Art Show (1979–1980), the inaugural edition of the Arts Council of Great Britain’s survey. She exhibited Stratagem, Trans-Cross, and Ancon in the touring exhibition across Sheffield, Newcastle, and Bristol. Packer wrote of her work:

"Janet Nathan began as a painter but wanted to get away from painting an illusion of space and present real space itself. Stratagem, Trans-Cross and Ancon are made with the dockland debris of her Thames warehouse studio. The careful arrangement of verticals and horizontals, the contrasts of colour and texture, the use of wide and narrow materials, build up as paint and drawing on canvas and present a tangible image of the waterfront.

Nathan was also a regular participant in the Wapping Artists Open Studios exhibitions held at SPACE Studios (1979–1982) and the Wapping Sports Centre (1983), concluding with The Last Wapping Show in September 1985.

Contemporary reviews and catalogue texts frequently highlighted her Wapping studio as central to her practice. In 1978, Adrian Searle noted "evocations of dockland life, water, local imagery" arising from her Thames studio. Mary Rose Beaumont wrote in 1988 that her 1980 construction Shoreline reflected "her experience of Wapping — the brown river, its gravelly shore with washed-up pieces of driftwood. In 2013, Tate curator Andrew Wilson similarly linked the materials and imagery of her reliefs Zeloso (1979) and Near Paros (1985) directly to her Wapping studio environment.

In 1984, she is elected to the London Group and In October 1985, Nathan featured in Coloured Constructions at the Curwen Gallery, London, exhibiting Near Paros(1985), which was later acquired by Tate. In the accompanying catalogue essay, art critic Marina Vaizey noted how Nathan's constructions suggested "the natural architectural paths of riverbeds”.[Vaizey, Marina. ‘Coloured Constructions.’ Exhibition catalogue essay, Curwen Gallery, London, 10 October–2 November 1985.

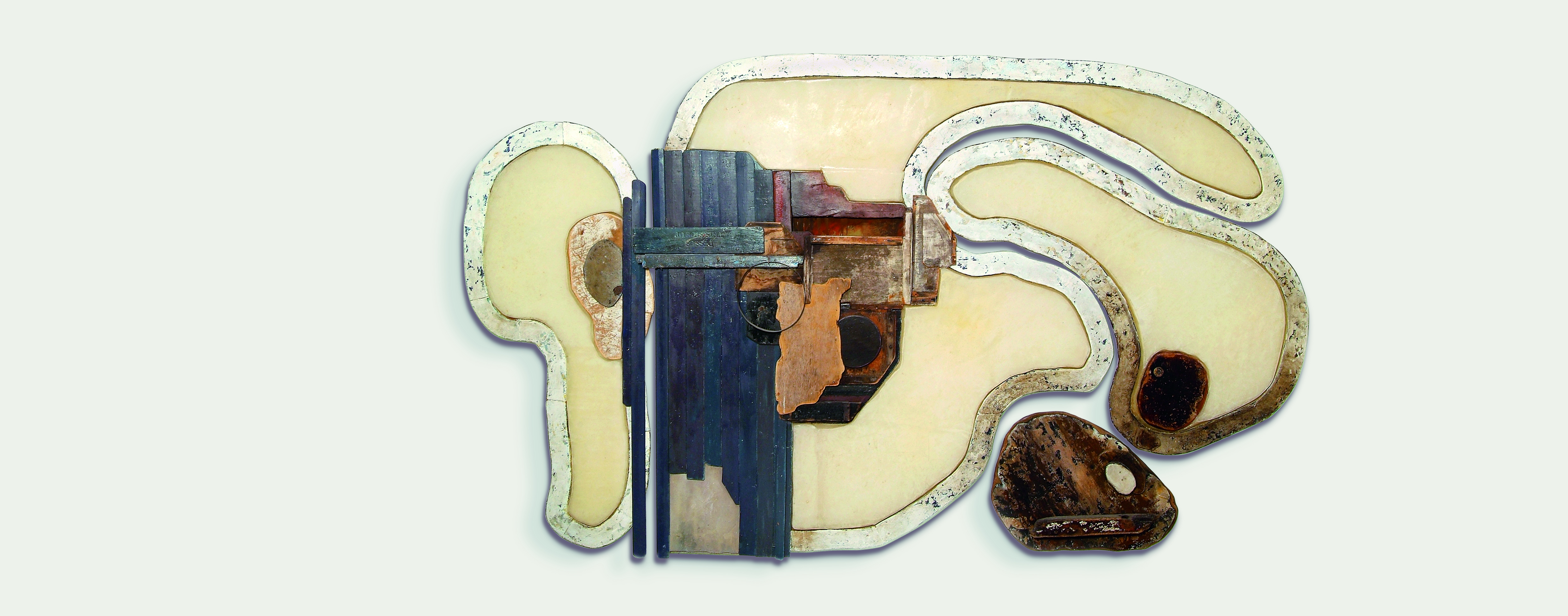
Lakeland (1997) Mixed media on wood and resin, July 2026.

== Exhibitions ==
Nathan held her first institutional solo exhibition at Newcastle Polytechnic Art Gallery in 1979. Other early exhibitions included Painted Constructions, ICA, London (1980), Coloured Constructions, Ikon Gallery, Birmingham (1982), The British Art Show (1980), Whitechapel Open (1983, 1984), and John Moores Painting Prize, Liverpool (1987). She also exhibited in Art and the Sea (Glasgow, 1981; ICA, 1982) and The Discerning Eye (1990). In 1990 she was commissioned to create work for the relaunch of The Ivy restaurant, listed in The Ivy: The Restaurant and Its Recipes alongside Sir Eduardo Paolozzi and Peter Blake. In 1997 the Barbican Centre presented a major retrospective, Janet Nathan: Constructions 1979–1997, which toured to Folkestone, Sheffield and Brighton.

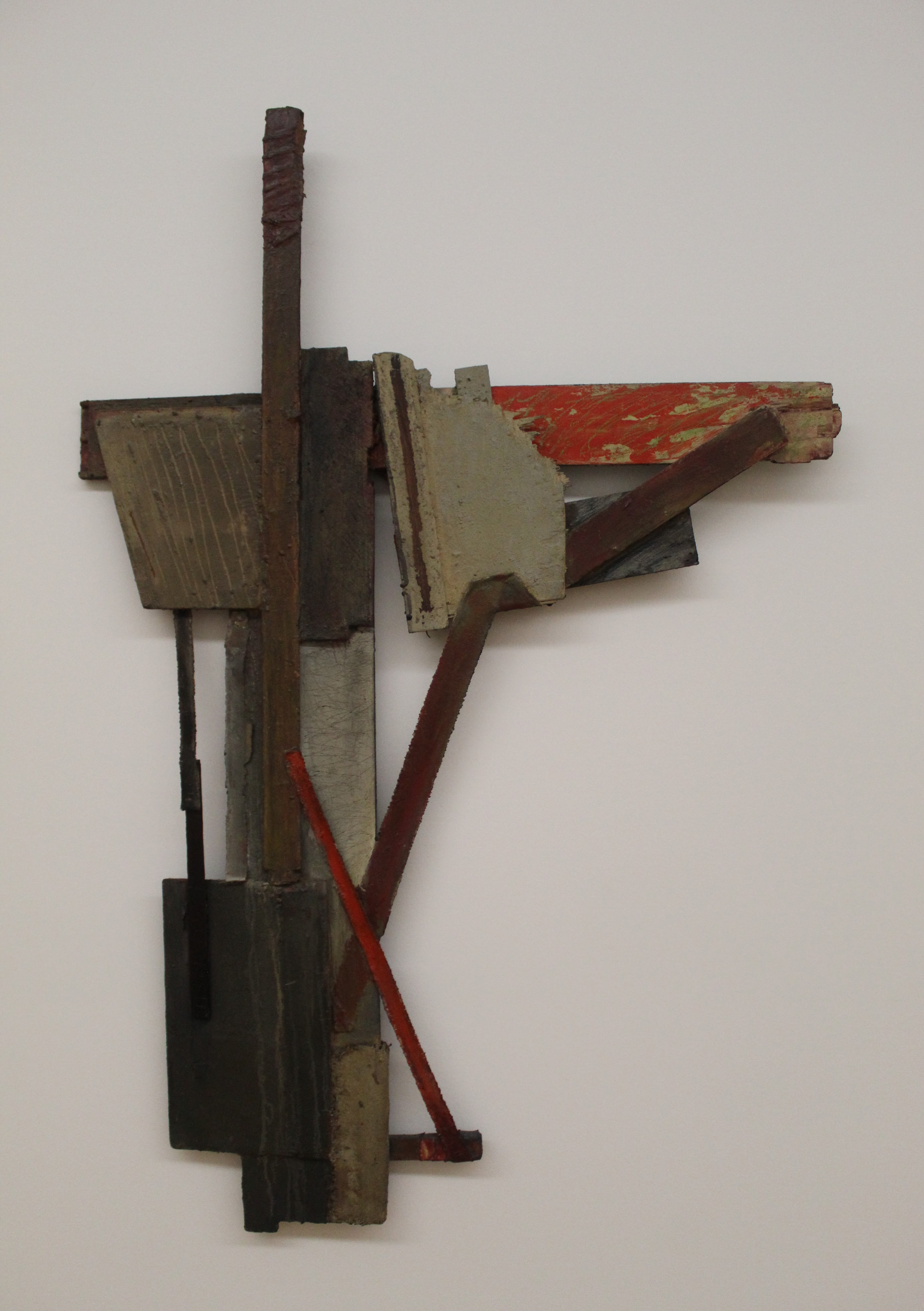
Zeloso, 1979, by Janet Nathan

In 1987, Nathan exhibited Waterway in the John Moores Liverpool Exhibition 15 at the Walker Art Gallery, Liverpool. She returned to the exhibition in John Moores 19 (1995), exhibiting Nile Drift. Across four decades, she exhibited 46 works across 27 Royal Academy Summer Exhibitions beginning in 1980 with her first selection (Transient and Zeloso, 1979, now in Tate) and her final selection in 2014.

Two major reliefs by Nathan are held in the permanent collection of the Tate; including Zeloso (1979), mixed media relief (T13889) and Near Paros (1985), mixed media relief (T13888).

Janet Nathan was selected twice for the John Moores Painting Prize Show and exhibited approximately 46 works across 27 Royal Academy Summer Exhibitions.

Nathan's work has also been included in exhibitions drawn from the Arts Council Collection, including From Downs to Sea at Brighton Museum in 2014.

Posthumous exhibitions included Ideas into Action, at the Tate in 2023-2026, The London Group at Bankside, at the Bankside Gallery in 2022, and Voyages, at the Willow Beck Gallery, Harrogate in 2025.

== Photography ==
In 2000, the National Gallery selected Nathan's photograph of Patrick Caulfield with a rented bull's head, used in the preparation of his work Hemingway, as the official artist portrait for the exhibition catalogue Encounters: New Art from Old.

== London Group ==
Nathan became a member of The London Group in 1984 and exhibited regularly with the group from the early 1980s through the 2010s. She served on the group's Membership Committee from 2013 to 2018.

In 2015, Nathan participated in Combines, a London Group exhibition accompanied by a film documenting the participating artists and their studio practices.

Her final solo exhibition was held at the group's gallery, the Cello Factory, in 2019. Her work was also shown at Morley Gallery, the Royal College of Art, Chelsea Arts Club and the Barbican Centre.

== Themes, materials and critical reception ==
Critics emphasised Nathan’s constructed relief forms made from wood, board, resin and found materials. Maritime and shoreline motifs recur throughout her practice, referencing docks, jetties, mudflats and coastal structures. Leading critics including Bryan Robertson, Mel Gooding, Mary-Rose Beaumont and Andrew Lambirth wrote on Nathan’s work. Beaumont (1988) identified the “cruciform” as a key formal device in her early works, culminating in the relief Zeloso (1979); Gooding described her method as one of “lyric geometry”; and Robertson compared her constructions to those of Louise Nevelson.

The art critic William Packer reviewed Nathan's work for the Financial Times on multiple occasions. A 1997 review in the Sheffield Telegraph covered her transition into constructed relief work.

== Personal life ==
From the mid-1980s Nathan lived with painter Patrick Caulfield CBE RA on Belsize Square, London. Caulfield’s final painting, Braque Curtain (2005), was created as a tribute to her. She married Caulfield in 1999 and, following her death on 4 July 2020, they were interred in the same plot at Highgate Cemetery. Nathan had three sons from a previous marriage.

Nathan's friendship with painter John Hoyland is documented in Lambirth’s monograph of Hoyland, noting a 1988 sailing trip with Nathan, Caulfield and Beverley Heath.

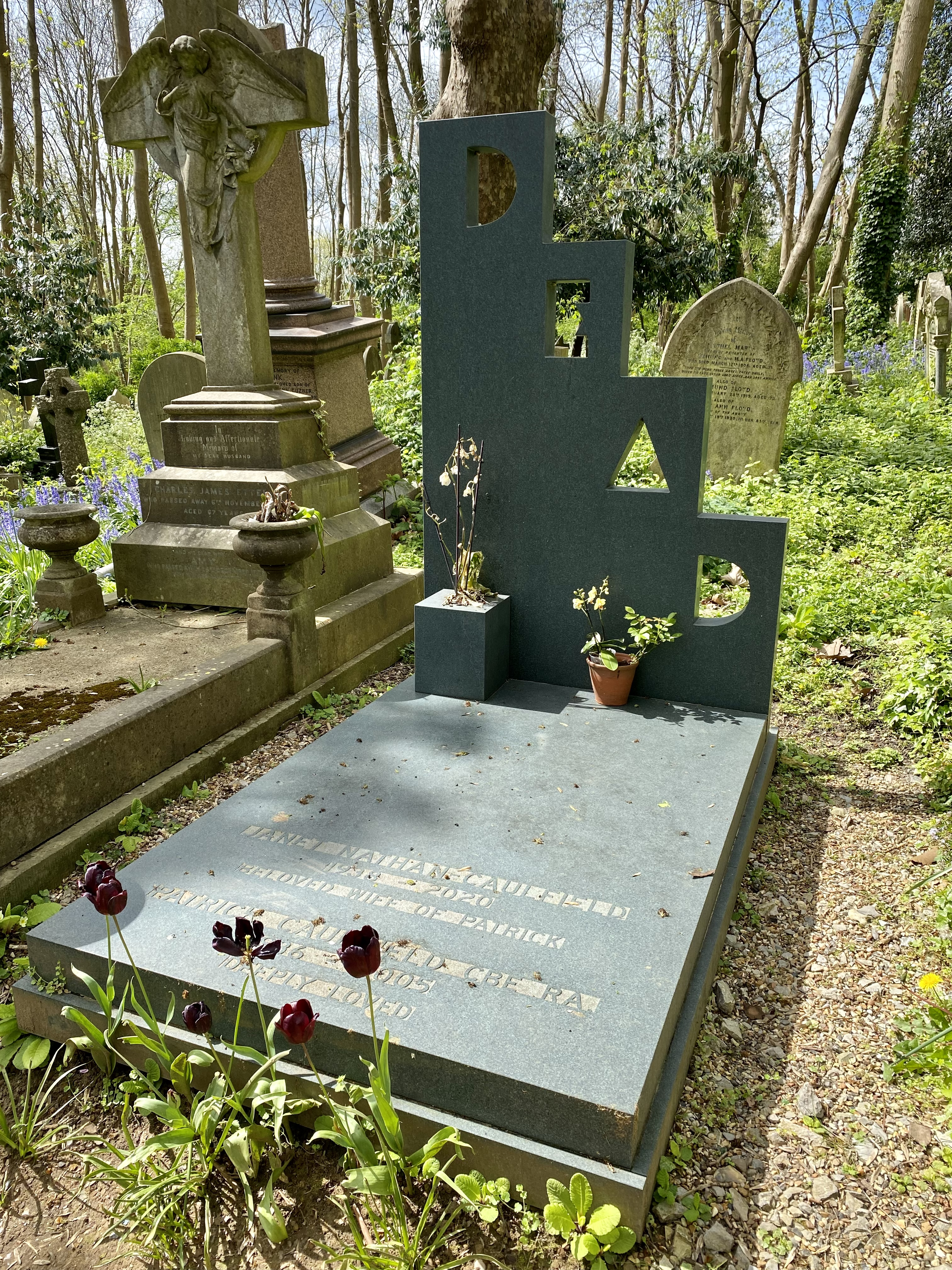
The grave of Janet Nathan and Patrick Caulfield at Highgate Cemetery, April 2024.
