= General assembly =

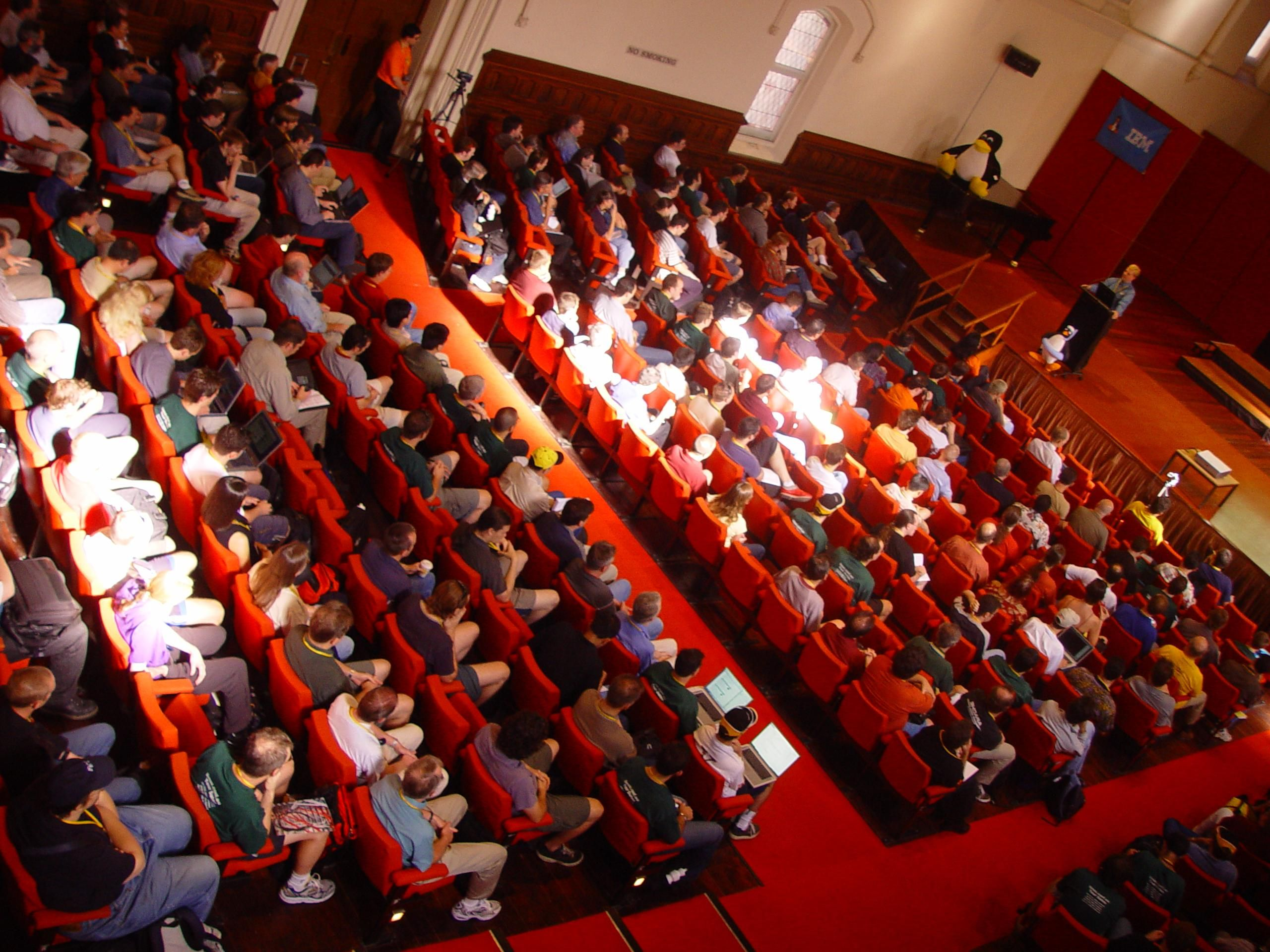

A general assembly or general meeting is a meeting of all the members of an organization or shareholders of a company.

Specific examples of general assembly include:

== Churches ==
- General Assembly (presbyterian church), the highest court of presbyterian polity
  - General Assembly of the Church of Scotland, highest court of the Church of Scotland
  - General Assembly of the Presbyterian Church in Ireland, highest court of the Presbyterian Church in Ireland
- General Assembly (Unitarian Universalist Association), annual gathering of Unitarian Universalists of the Unitarian Universalist Association
- General Assembly of Unitarian and Free Christian Churches, umbrella organisation for Unitarian, Free Christian and other religious congregations in the United Kingdom
- General Ordinary Assembly, advisory body for the Pope in the Catholic Church
- World Evangelical Alliance § General Assemblies

== International organizations ==
- FIA General Assembly, an international motor-racing organization
- General Assembly of the Organization of American States, the main body of the OAS
- United Nations General Assembly, one of the six principal organs of the United Nations

== National or sub-national legislatures ==
- Confederate Ireland's parliament, during 1642–1649
- General Assembly of Nova Scotia, the legislature of that Canadian province
- General Assembly of Uruguay, the national legislature of Uruguay
- General Assembly of the Empire of Brazil, parliament of the Empire of Brazil

=== United States state legislatures ===
- Arkansas General Assembly
- Colorado General Assembly
- Connecticut General Assembly
- Delaware General Assembly
- Georgia General Assembly
- Illinois General Assembly
- Indiana General Assembly
- Iowa General Assembly
- Kentucky General Assembly
- Maryland General Assembly
- Missouri General Assembly
- New Jersey General Assembly, lower house of the bicameral New Jersey Legislature
- New York General Assembly (historical colonial)
- North Carolina General Assembly
- Ohio General Assembly
- Pennsylvania General Assembly
- Rhode Island General Assembly
- South Carolina General Assembly
- Tennessee General Assembly
- Vermont General Assembly
- Virginia General Assembly

== Other uses ==
- General Assembly (horse), American throughbred racehorse
- General assembly (Occupy movement), the primary decision-making bodies of the global Occupy Movement which arose in 2011
- General Assembly (school), a private for-profit education company
- General Assembly, a fictional international council from the browser game NationStates

== See also ==
- Annual general meeting
- Popular assembly, a gathering called to address issues of importance to participants
- ICCA Congress & Exhibition, the annual meeting of the International Congress and Convention Association
- Conference
- Assembly (disambiguation)
- Landsgemeinde, institution of direct democracy in some Swiss cantons
