= Calloni =

Calloni is an Italian surname. Notable people with the surname include:

- Antônio Calloni (born 1961), Brazilian actor
- Egidio Calloni (born 1952), Italian footballer
- Raffaella Calloni (born 1983), Italian volleyball player
- Stella Calloni (born 1935), Argentine writer

== See also ==
- Facundo Callioni
- Elvira Cupello Calonio
