= Assemblée Nationale (disambiguation) =

Assemblée Nationale may refer to:

== Legislatures ==
=== In France ===
- National Assembly (France) (the current lower house of the French Parliament)
- National Assembly (French Revolution) (the French legislature from June to July 1789)
- National Constituent Assembly (France) (the French legislature from July 1789 to 1791)
- Legislative Assembly (France) ("Assemblée législative": the French legislature from 1791 to 1792)
- National Assembly (1871), (the French legislature from 1871 to 1875)

=== In Francophone countries ===
- People's National Assembly (Algeria, "Assemblée populaire nationale"")
- National Assembly (Burundi)
- National Assembly (Benin)
- National Assembly of Burkina Faso
- National Assembly (Cameroon)
- National Assembly (Central African Republic)
- National Assembly (Chad)
- National Assembly (Democratic Republic of the Congo)
- National Assembly (Djibouti)
- National Assembly of Gabon
- National Assembly (Guinea)
- National Assembly (Ivory Coast)
- Parliament of Lebanon, sometimes called "Assemblée Nationale"
- National Assembly (Mali)
- National Assembly (Mauritania)
- National Assembly (Mauritius)
- National Assembly (Niger)
- National Assembly of Quebec
- National Assembly (Senegal)
- National Assembly (Togo)

== Transit ==
- Assemblée Nationale station, a Paris Metro station

== See also ==
- National Assembly
- National Assembly (disambiguation)
