= Elena Mendizabal =

Basque sculptor and university professor (born 1960)

- Born: 1960 (age 65–66); San Sebastián, Basque Autonomous Community, Spain
- Occupations: Artist and university professor
- Known for: Sculpture (conceptual art, constructivism

Elena Mendizabal Eguialde (born 1960) is an artist, sculptor, and professor at the Faculty of Fine Arts of the University of the Basque Country (EHU) in Spain.

== Early life ==
Mendizabal was born in San Sebastián in the Basque Autonomous Community. She trained in Fine Arts in Bilbao at the same time as artists such as Txomin Badiola, Juan Luis Moraza and María Luisa Fernández, and was part of a movement in the early 1980s that pioneered a new approach to sculpture in Spain.

== Career ==
In 1982, Mendizabal became a drawing teacher at the University of the Basque Country, where she later became a professor at the Faculty of Fine Arts in 1988. She obtained a doctorate, Cum Laude, in 1993 with a thesis on the proximity between sculpture and objects. She has published several books and articles in journals and magazines and has collaborated on four research projects at the university and at the University of Vigo. She has carried out research on sculpture in the collections of the faculty, and in those of the Artium Museum in Vitoria-Gasteiz, the Fine Arts Museum of Bilbao, and an art and history museum in Durango. She was secretary of the Department of Sculpture of EHU between 2008 and 2010 and director of the department from 2010 to 2014.

== Sculpture ==
Sculpture has been the main medium in which Mendizabal works, although she also uses photographs, drawings and collages. A retrospective held at the Artium Museum between November 2019 and May 2020 contained almost 100 pieces from the 1980s and 1990s which, the exhibition curators believed, helped visitors to understand a historical period in which the creative context of the Basque Country was vibrant and visible. Her early work suggests a clash between the post-minimalist approach of international art at the time and the legacy of sculpture techniques in the Basque Country. In later years her research led to her beginning to combine traditional sculptural materials with elements such as wallpaper, Formica or electric light, elements that she hoped would bring the experience of sculpture closer to daily life, by recreating a world filled with references to the commonplace.

Although her sculpture derives from conceptual art, her interest in the sculpture of Jorge Oteiza, one of the main theorists of Basque modern art, has led her to explore constructivism. Her work is said to have been distinguished by the freedom with which she begins a new project, reinventing herself rather than following any fixed style. Moving from the use of iron and wood, to the addition of colour, polyester bodies, plasticine, ceramics, mud, and three-dimensional printing, her sculptures have often been described as being autobiographical. For a 2013 exhibition, she stated that she had intentionally sought to create a work of a choral nature in which, like a choir, the entirety is more than the sum of the individual pieces.

== Collections and exhibitions ==
Mendizabal's work can be found in the collections of the Museo Nacional Centro de Arte Reina Sofía in Madrid and in the Fine Arts Museum of Bilbao and the Artium Museum in Vitoria-Gasteiz, as well as in many private collections. Her exhibitions have largely been confined to the Basque Autonomous Community and she has rarely exhibited outside of Spain. Recent solo exhibitions have included BMAV 2020, the Biennial of Women in the Visual Arts, held at ARTIUM, where she was invited to present, and a 2025 exhibition at La Casa Encendida in Madrid, together with Joan Rom, entitled Gold Woven with Straw. Between November 2026 and February 2027 she exhibited at Maisterra, Madrid.
