= Assembleia Nacional =

Assembleia Nacional is a Portuguese expression meaning National Assembly. It may refer to:

- National Assembly of Angola (Assembleia Nacional de Angola)
- National People's Assembly of Guinea-Bissau (Assembleia Nacional Popular da Guiné-Bissau)
- National Assembly of São Tomé and Príncipe (Assembleia Nacional de São Tomé e Principe)
- Assembleia Nacional (Portugal), the Portuguese legislature during the Estado Novo (Portugal) (1933-1974)

== See also ==
- National Assembly (disambiguation)
