= Willy Caballero =

Argentine association football player

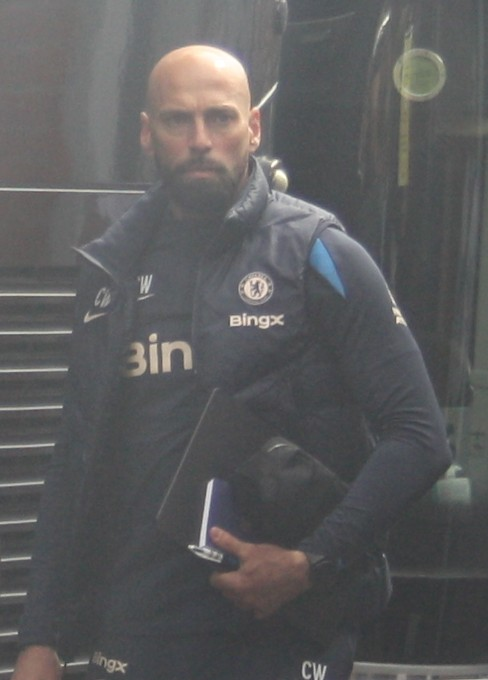
- Caballero in 2025

Personal information
- Full name: Wilfredo Daniel Caballero Lazcano
- Date of birth: 28 September 1981 (age 45)
- Place of birth: Santa Elena, Argentina
- Height: 1.86 m (6 ft 1 in)
- Position: Goalkeeper

Team information
- Current team: Manchester City (first-team coach)

Senior career*
| Years | Team | Apps | (Gls) |
| 2001–2004 | Boca Juniors | 15 | (0) |
| 2004–2011 | Elche | 186 | (0) |
| 2006 | → Arsenal Sarandí (loan) | 13 | (0) |
| 2011–2014 | Málaga | 117 | (0) |
| 2014–2017 | Manchester City | 23 | (0) |
| 2017–2021 | Chelsea | 11 | (0) |
| 2021–2023 | Southampton | 2 | (0) |
| Total | | 367 | (0) |

International career
| 2001 | Argentina U20 | 2 | (0) |
| 2018 | Argentina | 5 | (0) |

Managerial career
- 2023–2024: Leicester City (assistant)
- 2024–2026: Chelsea (assistant)
Medal record
Men's football
Representing Argentina
Olympic Games
| Gold medal – first place | 2004 Athens | Team |
FIFA U-20 World Cup
| Winner | 2001 Argentina |
- * Club domestic league appearances and goals as of 17:30, 16 December 2021 (UTC)

Wilfredo Daniel Caballero Lazcano (born 28 September 1981) is an Argentine professional football coach and former goalkeeper who is first-team coach for Premier League club Manchester City.

He spent most of his career in Spain, representing Elche and Málaga and competing in La Liga with the latter club. In the summer of 2014 he signed for Manchester City, helping them win the 2016 League Cup. In 2017, he joined Chelsea where he was a backup keeper for four seasons.

Caballero made his senior debut for Argentina in 2018. He represented the nation at the 2018 World Cup, and was also a non-playing member of the squads that won a gold medal at the 2004 Summer Olympics.

== Club career ==
=== Early career ===
Born in Santa Elena, Entre Ríos, Caballero started his playing career with Boca Juniors in 2001, where he won three major titles in 2003. On 14 December of that year he witnessed – from the bench – his team beat A.C. Milan 3–1 on penalties, in the 2003 Intercontinental Cup.

Caballero joined Elche of Spain in 2004, and when his daughter was diagnosed with cancer he agreed to a brief loan spell back in his country with Arsenal de Sarandí to care for her, published on Ivoox. With Elche, after a rough first season, he went on to become the undisputed starter, appearing in nearly 200 Segunda División games.

=== Málaga ===
On 10 February 2011, Caballero was transferred to Málaga in La Liga for €900,000 and two and a half years, as an emergency transfer – after the transfer deadline of 31 January – due to a serious knee injury to Sergio Asenjo (their previous starter, Rubén, was also unavailable due to physical problems); he made his league debut on 20 February, starting in a 1–1 draw at Villarreal, and played all the matches until the end of the campaign, with the Andalusians finally escaping relegation.

On 1 October 2011, Caballero entered Málaga's history books as he kept his goal clean for 480 minutes, beating the club's previous record of 429 held by Pedro Contreras since the 2001–02 season. On 16 October, he was sent off midway through the first half of an away fixture against Levante after touching the ball with his hands just outside the box – the hosts eventually won it 3–0.

On 18 January 2012, Caballero signed a contract extension, tying him to the club until 2016. On 25 March, playing against Espanyol, he fractured his left hand early into the game, being sidelined for the rest of the season.

Caballero returned to full fitness for 2012–13, featuring in all but two games and helping the Boquerones to the sixth position. Goal.com named him as the best player in his position for the campaign. At the end of the following season, he was nominated as the best goalkeeper in the league alongside Thibaut Courtois of Atlético Madrid and Keylor Navas of Levante.

=== Manchester City ===
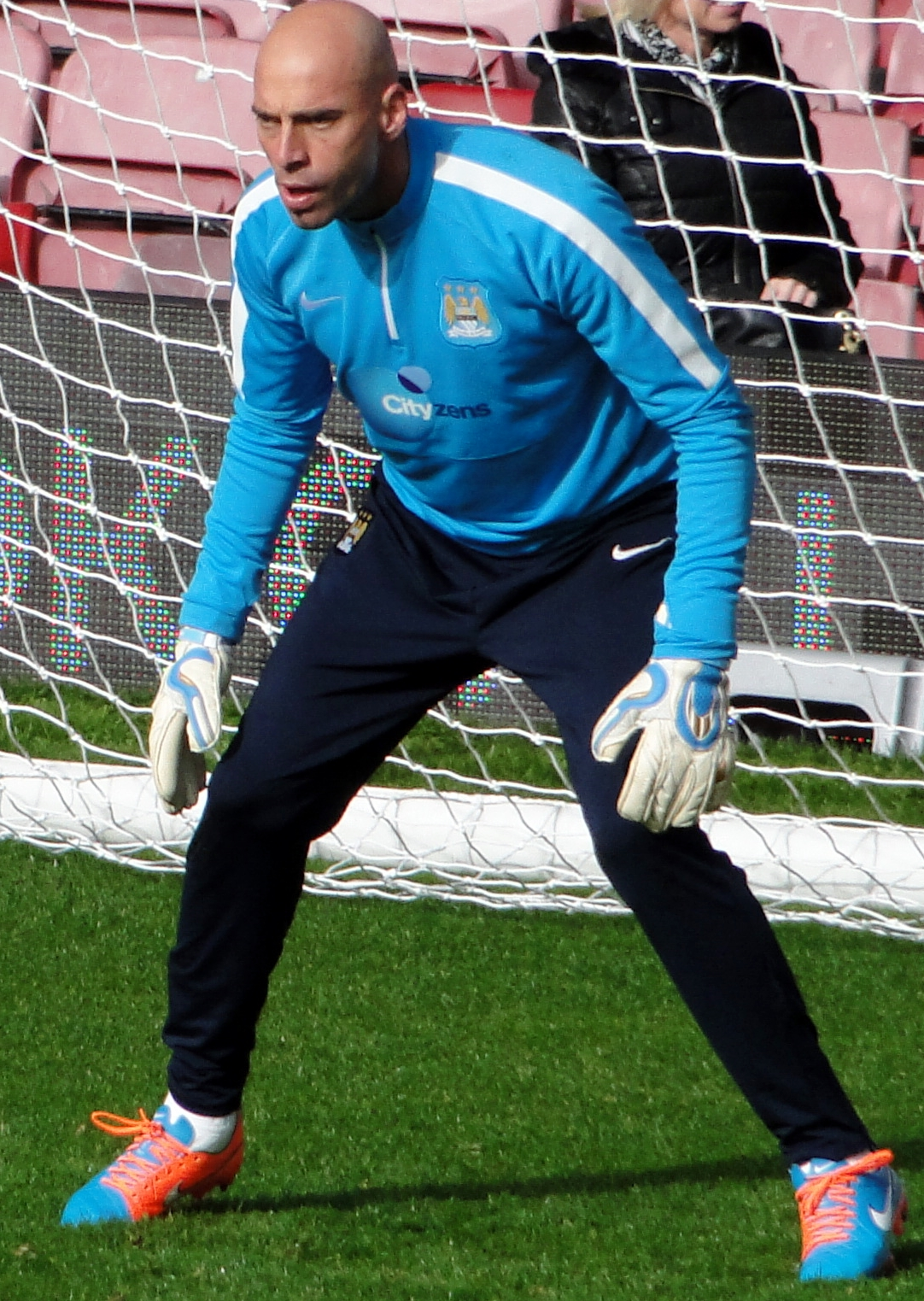
Caballero warming up for Manchester City in 2014

On 8 July 2014, Caballero signed a three-year deal with Manchester City, for a fee believed to be in the region of £6 million excluding add-ons. He reunited at his new club with former Málaga manager Manuel Pellegrini, and his competitive debut came on 10 August in the 2014 FA Community Shield, playing the full 90 minutes in a 0–3 loss to Arsenal at Wembley Stadium; a week later, in the Premier League opener, he was an unused substitute at Newcastle United.

Caballero's second official appearance for City occurred on 24 September 2014, in the 7–0 home routing of Sheffield Wednesday for the Football League Cup. He made his first league appearance away against Hull City three days later, relegating longtime incumbent Joe Hart to the bench in a 4–2 win.

Caballero's third league match was on 26 September 2015, a 1–4 defeat at Tottenham Hotspur. Throughout the season, he was first-choice in the League Cup, receiving criticism in the national press before the final following a poor performance in the 1–5 loss to Chelsea in the FA Cup; in the decisive match at Wembley Stadium, he saved three attempts in the 3–1 penalty shootout triumph against Liverpool, and Pellegrini subsequently said he would rather lose the match to keep his word, whilst several pundits added that both player and manager deserved an apology with some remarking the performance was a lesson in loyalty.

Following the appointment of manager Pep Guardiola in the 2016 off-season, Caballero became the starter over Hart. Soon after, with the signing of Claudio Bravo, he returned to his backup role.

On 19 October 2016, Caballero appeared as a substitute in a 0–4 defeat by Barcelona at the Camp Nou in the group stage of the UEFA Champions League. After replacing the red-carded Bravo in goal, he saved a penalty from Neymar in the 87th minute of the match. Two weeks later, he deputised for the suspended Bravo in the 3–1 home win over the same opponent for the same competition.

On 1 February 2017, Caballero replaced Bravo. On his return to the starting XI, he kept a clean sheet in a 4–0 win over West Ham United at the London Olympic Stadium. Late into the month, in a 5–3 Champions League round of 16 win over Monaco, he saved a penalty from Radamel Falcao.

On 25 May 2017, it was announced Caballero would leave the club on the expiry of his contract, which occurred on 30 June.

=== Chelsea ===
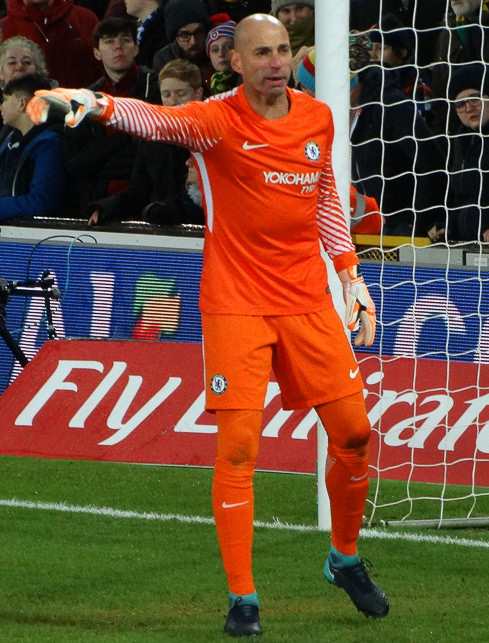
Caballero playing for Chelsea in 2018

On 1 July 2017, Caballero signed for title holders Chelsea on a free transfer. He made his competitive debut on 20 September, in a 5–1 home win against Nottingham Forest for the League Cup.

On 17 January 2018, Caballero saved a penalty from Nélson Oliveira in the shootout of a third round FA Cup replay win over Norwich City, which had finished 1–1 after extra time. Due to an ankle injury to first-choice Thibaut Courtois, he made his Premier League debut away to Brighton & Hove Albion two days later, in a 4–0 success.

On 24 February 2019, during the 2019 EFL Cup final against cup holders Manchester City, with the match at 0–0 and a penalty shootout imminent, Chelsea goalkeeper Kepa Arrizabalaga refused to be substituted off for Caballero to face his old club as the team went on to lose 3–4.

With Arrizabalaga struggling to stay in form during the 2019–20 Premier League season, Caballero was selected as the starting goalkeeper for Chelsea in a cup match against Hull City in late January 2020. Caballero was then the starting goalkeeper for the next four league matches and a Champions League match before Arrizabalaga returned. Caballero played in the 2020 FA Cup final, a 2–1 loss to Arsenal On 20 May 2020, Caballero had his contract with Chelsea extended by one more year.

On 29 May 2021, Caballero won the 2021 UEFA Champions League final with Chelsea against his former club Manchester City, but was an unused substitute in the game. On 4 June 2021, Chelsea announced he would depart from the club at the end of the month when his contract expired, and thanked him for his contribution to the team with an extended article for his time and feats there.

=== Southampton ===
On 6 December 2021, Caballero signed for Premier League side Southampton on a one-month contract after Southampton's two main goalkeepers both suffered injuries. Caballero had been training with EFL League One side AFC Wimbledon since leaving Chelsea in June. On 11 December 2021, Caballero made his competitive debut in Southampton's 3–0 defeat to Arsenal. On 7 January 2022, Caballero extended his contract to the end of the season.

On 1 July 2022, Caballero signed a one-year contract extension with Southampton. On 10 July 2023, he retired from professional football at the age of 41 years old.

== International career ==
Caballero played for Argentina at under-20 level, helping the nation win the 2001 FIFA World Youth Championship by playing in the competition's last two games. In 2004, he was picked for the gold medal-winning squad at the 2004 Summer Olympics as backup to Germán Lux (also first-choice in the previous tournament).

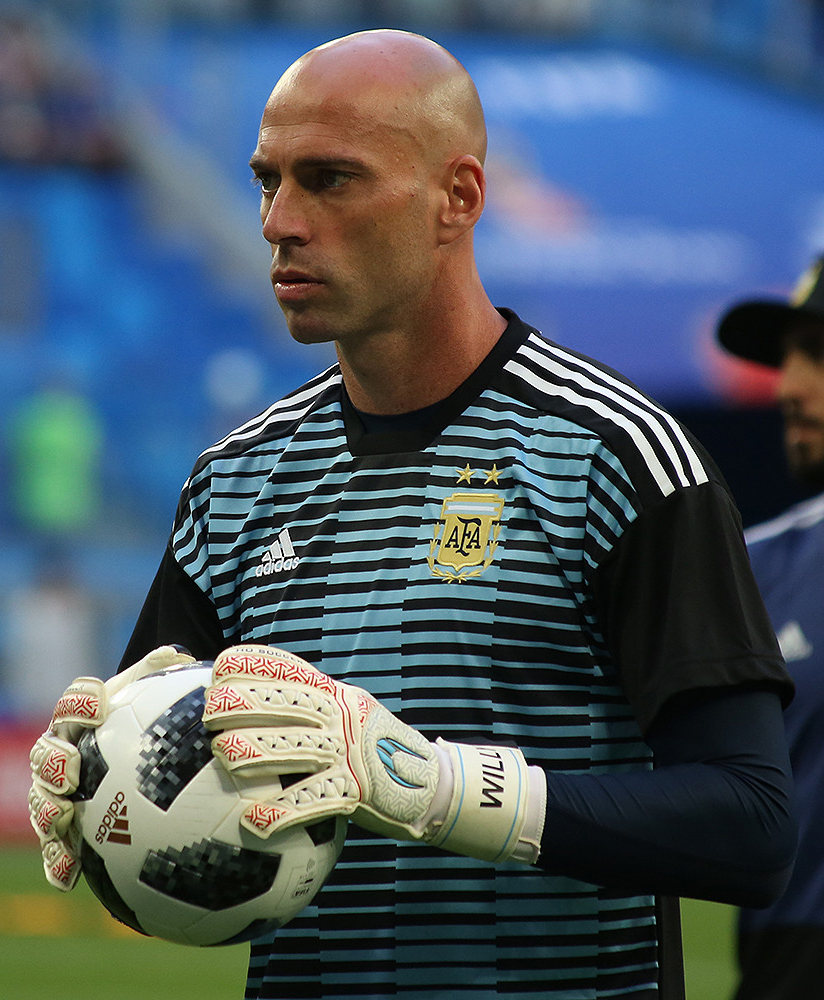
Caballero with Argentina at the 2018 FIFA World Cup

Caballero was an unused member for the senior squad at the 2005 FIFA Confederations Cup. In November 2014, he was called by manager Gerardo Martino for friendlies against Croatia and Portugal. He only won his first cap nearly four years later at the age of 36, starting in a 2–0 defeat of Italy on 23 March 2018 in another exhibition game, played in Manchester.

Caballero was included in the final squad for the 2018 FIFA World Cup in Russia. He started the tournament due to the injury of habitual first-choice Sergio Romero, and made his debut in the competition on 16 June in a 1–1 group stage draw against Iceland. In the next match against Croatia, his mistake handed the opposition the first goal in a 0–3 defeat, and he was subsequently dropped by manager Jorge Sampaoli in favour of Franco Armani for the team's final group match against Nigeria, which ended in a 2–1 win; he also did not feature in the round of 16 game, a 4–3 loss to France.

== Style of play ==
Caballero was mainly known for his shot-stopping, and ability to save penalty kicks. Although he was not initially known to be naturally adept with his feet, Caballero worked to improve his ball skills and distribution as his career progressed, which allowed him to be deployed as a sweeper keeper under manager Pep Guardiola at Manchester City, and to be involved in the build-up of attacking plays, with Guardiola even praising him for his "personality" in August 2016. He is also known for his leadership qualities in the dressing room. Moreover, Caballero has been praised for his ability as a back-up goalkeeper, and for his penchant for being decisive when called upon.

== Coaching career ==
On 9 July 2023, Caballero was announced as the new assistant manager of Leicester City, becoming part of new manager Enzo Maresca's backroom staff. He moved to a similar role at his former club, Chelsea, in June 2024.

== Career statistics ==
=== Club ===
Appearances and goals by club, season and competition
| Club | Season | League | | | National Cup (Note: Includes Copa del Rey, FA Cup) | | League Cup (Note: Includes Football League/EFL Cup) | | Continental | | Other | | Total | |
| Club | Season | Division | Apps | Goals | Apps | Goals | Apps | Goals | Apps | Goals | Apps | Goals | Apps | Goals |
|---|---|---|---|---|---|---|---|---|---|---|---|---|---|---|
| Boca Juniors | 2001–02 | Argentine Primera División | 4 | 0 | 0 | 0 | — | | 0 | 0 | — | | 4 | 0 |
| Boca Juniors | 2002–03 | Argentine Primera División | 4 | 0 | 0 | 0 | — | | 3 (Note: Appearances in Copa Sudamericana) | 0 | — | | 7 | 0 |
| Boca Juniors | 2003–04 | Argentine Primera División | 1 | 0 | 0 | 0 | — | | 0 | 0 | — | | 1 | 0 |
| Boca Juniors | 2004–05 | Argentine Primera División | 6 | 0 | 0 | 0 | — | | 1 (Note: Appearance in Copa Libertadores) | 0 | — | | 7 | 0 |
| Boca Juniors | Total | | 15 | 0 | 0 | 0 | — | | 4 | 0 | — | | 19 | 0 |
| Elche | 2005–06 | Segunda División | 10 | 0 | 0 | 0 | — | | — | | — | | 10 | 0 |
| Elche | 2006–07 | Segunda División | 39 | 0 | 2 | 0 | — | | — | | — | | 41 | 0 |
| Elche | 2007–08 | Segunda División | 38 | 0 | 4 | 0 | — | | — | | — | | 42 | 0 |
| Elche | 2008–09 | Segunda División | 38 | 0 | 2 | 0 | — | | — | | — | | 40 | 0 |
| Elche | 2009–10 | Segunda División | 39 | 0 | 1 | 0 | — | | — | | — | | 40 | 0 |
| Elche | 2010–11 | Segunda División | 22 | 0 | 0 | 0 | — | | — | | — | | 22 | 0 |
| Elche | Total | | 186 | 0 | 9 | 0 | — | | — | | — | | 195 | 0 |
| Arsenal Sarandí (loan) | 2006–07 | Argentine Primera División | 13 | 0 | 0 | 0 | — | | — | | — | | 13 | 0 |
| Málaga | 2010–11 | La Liga | 15 | 0 | 0 | 0 | — | | — | | — | | 15 | 0 |
| Málaga | 2011–12 | La Liga | 28 | 0 | 4 | 0 | — | | — | | — | | 32 | 0 |
| Málaga | 2012–13 | La Liga | 36 | 0 | 0 | 0 | — | | 11 (Note: Appearance(s) in UEFA Champions League) | 0 | — | | 47 | 0 |
| Málaga | 2013–14 | La Liga | 38 | 0 | 1 | 0 | — | | — | | — | | 39 | 0 |
| Málaga | Total | | 117 | 0 | 5 | 0 | — | | 11 | 0 | — | | 133 | 0 |
| Manchester City | 2014–15 | Premier League | 2 | 0 | 2 | 0 | 2 | 0 | 0 | 0 | 1 (Note: Appearance in FA Community Shield) | 0 | 7 | 0 |
| Manchester City | 2015–16 | Premier League | 4 | 0 | 3 | 0 | 6 | 0 | 1 | 0 | — | | 14 | 0 |
| Manchester City | 2016–17 | Premier League | 17 | 0 | 2 | 0 | 2 | 0 | 6 | 0 | — | | 27 | 0 |
| Manchester City | Total | | 23 | 0 | 7 | 0 | 10 | 0 | 7 | 0 | 1 | 0 | 48 | 0 |
| Chelsea | 2017–18 | Premier League | 3 | 0 | 6 | 0 | 4 | 0 | 0 | 0 | 0 | 0 | 13 | 0 |
| Chelsea | 2018–19 | Premier League | 2 | 0 | 2 | 0 | 2 | 0 | 2 (Note: Appearances in UEFA Europa League) | 0 | 1 | 0 | 9 | 0 |
| Chelsea | 2019–20 | Premier League | 5 | 0 | 5 | 0 | 2 | 0 | 2 | 0 | 0 | 0 | 14 | 0 |
| Chelsea | 2020–21 | Premier League | 1 | 0 | 0 | 0 | 1 | 0 | 0 | 0 | — | | 2 | 0 |
| Chelsea | Total | | 11 | 0 | 13 | 0 | 9 | 0 | 4 | 0 | 1 | 0 | 38 | 0 |
| Southampton | 2021–22 | Premier League | 2 | 0 | 2 | 0 | — | | — | | — | | 4 | 0 |
| Southampton | 2022–23 | Premier League | 0 | 0 | 1 | 0 | 0 | 0 | — | | — | | 1 | 0 |
| Southampton | Total | | 2 | 0 | 3 | 0 | 0 | 0 | 0 | 0 | — | | 5 | 0 |
| Career total | | | 367 | 0 | 37 | 0 | 19 | 0 | 26 | 0 | 2 | 0 | 451 | 0 |

=== International ===
Appearances and goals by national team and year
| National team | Year | Apps | Goals |
|---|---|---|---|
Argentina
| Argentina | 2018 | 5 | 0 |
| Total | | 5 | 0 |

== Honours ==
=== Player ===
Boca Juniors

- Argentine Primera División: Apertura 2003
- Copa Libertadores: 2003
- Intercontinental Cup: 2003

Manchester City

- Football League Cup: 2015–16

Chelsea

- FA Cup: 2017–18; runner-up: 2019–20
- UEFA Champions League: 2020–21
- UEFA Europa League: 2018–19
- EFL Cup runner-up: 2018–19

Argentina U20

- FIFA World Youth Championship: 2001

Argentina Olympic

- Summer Olympic Games: 2004
- CONMEBOL Pre-Olympic Tournament: 2004

Argentina

- FIFA Confederations Cup runner-up: 2005

=== Assistant coach ===
Leicester City

- EFL Championship: 2023–24

Chelsea

- UEFA Conference League: 2024–25
- FIFA Club World Cup: 2025
