= The Sandwich EP =

EP by Grown at Home
- Released: May 2004
- Recorded: 2004
- Length: 15:58
- Label: Cash For Pigs Records CFP-EP1
- Producer: Iain Wetherall

Grown at Home chronology
The Sandwich EP (2004)	Assemble (2006)

The Sandwich EP is the debut EP recorded by the Stoke-based ska punk band Grown at Home. It was produced and mixed by Iain Wetherell. The EP received positive reviews, and the song "Don't Be a Menace to King Kong While Drinking Banana Juice in The Congo" was broadcast on BBC Radio 1's "The Lock Up" with Mike Davies.

The EP was released by Cash For Pigs Records (a label founded to release the EP) on compact disc. It is an eponymously titled EP, with cover art depicting a sandwich and the Grown at Home logo, but is referred to as The Sandwich EP by fans.

Although the EP is now out of print, having sold more than 1000 copies it is currently available for download from the iTunes Store.

== Track listing ==
1. "One Up"
2. "Don't Be a Menace to King Kong While Drinking Banana Juice in The Congo"
3. "PG-13"
4. "Captain Stabbin'"
5. "Sense of Humour"

== Trivia ==
- The title of the second song on the EP, "Don't Be a Menace to King Kong While Drinking Banana Juice in The Congo", is an obvious homage to the 1996 Wayans Brothers film Don't Be a Menace to South Central While Drinking Your Juice in the Hood.
- The song "Captain Stabbin'" is named after the hardcore pornography website captainstabbin.com.
