= Grown at Home =

British ska punk band

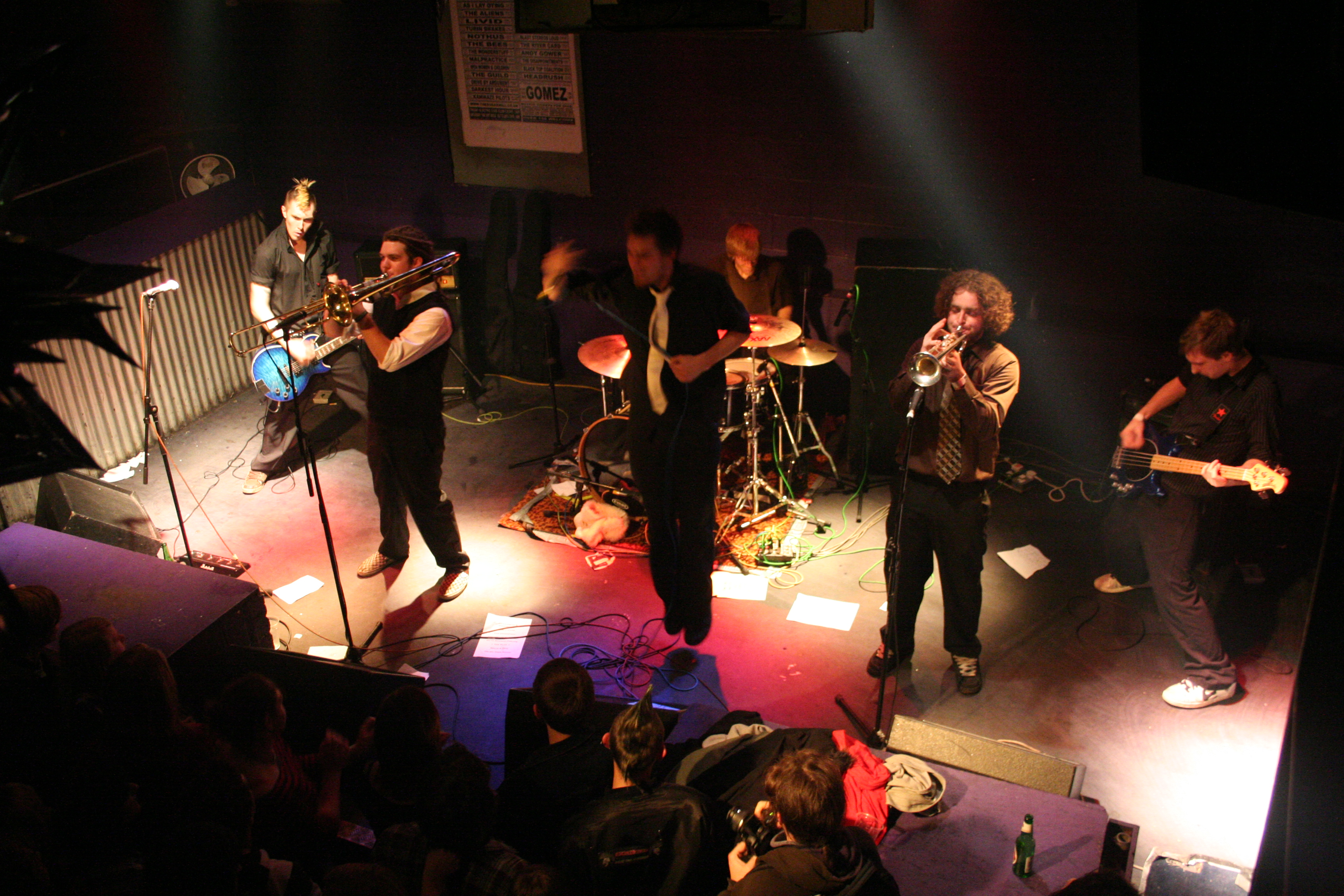

Background information
- Origin: Stafford
- Genre: Ska punk
- Years active: 2002–2009
- Label: CFP Records
- Members: Bob Barrett; Paul "Cookie" Cook; Sam McGregor; Lesley "Willis" Wilkes; Alex Shercliff; Andy Cooper
- Past members: Nick Phillips; Jay Phillips; Chris Hynam; Adam Kidd; Katie Grain

Grown at Home was a British ska punk band, tipped as "the new market leaders for their genre in this country, with a nationwide fanbase to back their unsurmountable popularity". The band formed in 2002 in Stafford.

== Biography ==
After forming in 2002 the band recorded their debut EP, The Sandwich EP in 2004, at Premier Studios, Corby, which was released on Cash For Pigs Records - a DIY label created by the band primarily for this release. The EP received positive reviews and was broadcast on BBC Radio 1 ("The Lock Up"). The EP has sold more than 1000 copies.

After releasing The Sandwich EP, Grown at Home toured the United Kingdom in support slots with bands from the United States punk scene such as Voodoo Glow Skulls, Rx Bandits, Never Heard Of It, Wheatus and The Aquabats!. They also toured with Howards Alias, Manchester genre terrorists Sonic Boom Six and female-fronted pop-punkers The Fight.

On 6 July 2006 Grown at Home released their debut album Assemble. The album was recorded at Street Level Studios in Cardiff and produced by Curig Huws. The song "Get Ready" received airplay from Mike Davies on Radio 1's The Lock Up.

Grown at Home were designated support band for a two-week-long Lightyear reunion tour in July 2006.

In December 2006 the band recorded a live session for BBC Radio Stoke's local music programme SUBculture.

In April and May 2007 Grown at Home supported the established Californian ska punk outfit Voodoo Glow Skulls on their European tour. During this time the band opened the German leg of 2007's extended Give It a Name Festival (featuring the likes of Jimmy Eat World, Lagwagon, Sparta and MxPx), as well as The Power Fest 2007 in Amsterdam, the Netherlands.

Since then they've headlined the Ska Trek - The Next Generation tour, and joined Sonic Boom Six on their Arcade Perfect album release tour. After the departure of singer Nick and a line-up change they have taken on a new image and, after only 4 weeks, wrote new material and developed old tracks to perform at a GASH Collective All night rave and the Bomb Ibiza's Ska Bar and plan to go much further.

2008 saw Grown at Home play Rebellion Festival in both Blackpool and Vienna, as well as a string of headline and support shows around the UK. Other live shows include support slots with Jaya the Cat, Spunge and The Cherry Poppin' Daddies.

== Hiatus and name change ==
In March 2009 following the departure of most of the original members and the arrival of several new ones, the band announced they would no longer tour as Grown at Home and would instead record and perform under the new name "Advantage".

== Band members ==
Original line-up

- Nick Phillips – lead vocals (2002–09)
- Bob Barrett – drums (2002–09)
- Paul "Cookie" Cook – lead guitar, lead vocals (2002–09)
- Chris Hynam – trumpet, backing vocals (2002–08)
- Jay Phillips – bass guitar (2002–08)
- Sam McGregor – trumpet, superbone, backing vocals (2003–09)
- Alex Kidd – trumpet (2003–06)
- Katie Grain – trombone (2003–04)
- Ed Davies – dancer (2003–04)

Contributing musicians

- Chris Hornby – saxophone, backing vocals (2004)
- Alex James – bass guitar, backing vocals (2002)

Final line-up (Advantage)

- Paul "Cookie" Cook – guitars, lead vocals (2003–09)
- Bob Barrett – drums (2002–09)
- Sam McGregor – trumpet, superbone, backing vocals (2003–09)
- Lesley "Willis" Wilkes – flugel horn, trumpet, backing vocals (2008–09)
- Alex Shercliff – bass guitar (2008–09)
- Andy Cooper – lead guitar (2008–09)

Timeline

== Discography ==
=== Albums ===
| Year | Album | Label |
|---|---|---|
| 2006 | Assemble | Cash For Pigs |

=== EPs and demos ===
| Year | Album | Label |
|---|---|---|
| 2003 | Grown at Home | self-released |
| 2003 | The Sandwich EP | Cash For Pigs |
| 2005 | Sheep and Werewolves | unreleased |
| 2005 | The Building Tracks | unreleased |

=== As "Advantage" ===
| Year | Album | Label |
|---|---|---|
| 2009 | Advantage EP | Cash For Pigs |
| 2009 | Future Echoes EP | Cash For Pigs |
| 2010 | The Beat (Get Up!) / Wait, is This Love? (Single) | Cash For Pigs |
