= Santa Elena, Entre Ríos =

Santa Elena
- City
- Location of Santa Elena in Argentina
- Coordinates: 30°57′S 59°48′W
- Country: Argentina
- Province: Entre Ríos
- Department: La Paz
- Elevation: 48 m (157 ft)

Population (2010 census)
  - Total: 17,791
- Time zone: UTC−3 (ART)
- CPA base: E3269
- Dialing code: +54 3437

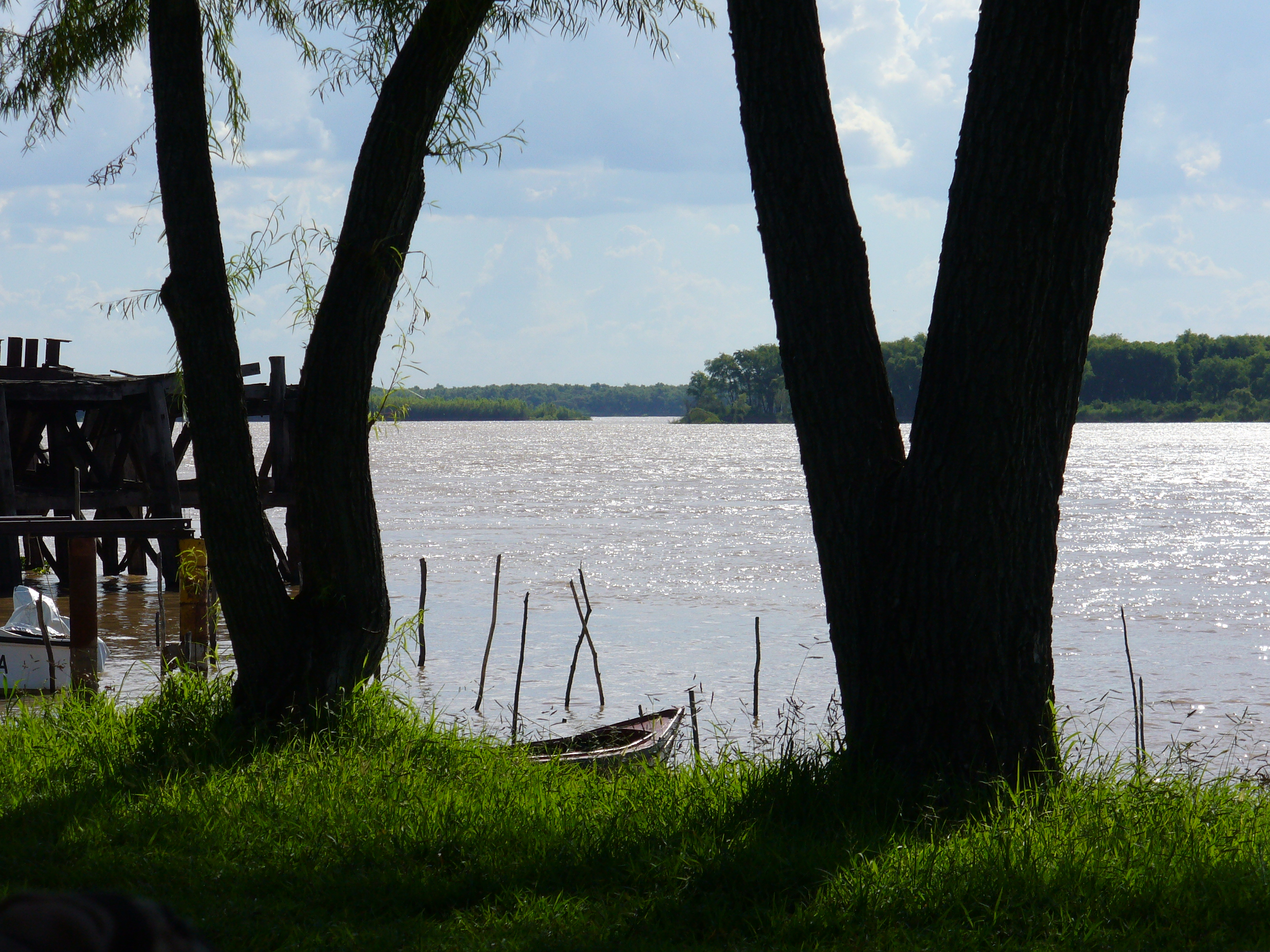

Santa Elena is a city in the province of Entre Ríos, Argentina. It has 17,791 inhabitants as per the 2010 census [INDEC]. It lies on the eastern shore of the Paraná River, 110 km (68 mi) north-northeast of the provincial capital Paraná.

== Notable people ==
- Willy Caballero, professional football goalkeeper was born in Santa Elena.
