= Assembler =

Assembler may refer to:

== Arts and media ==
- Nobukazu Takemura, avant-garde electronic musician, stage name Assembler
- Assemblers, a fictional race in the Star Wars universe
- Assemblers, an alternative name of the superhero group Champions of Angor

== Biology ==
- Assembler (bioinformatics), a program to perform genome assembly
- Assembler (nanotechnology), a conjectured construction machine that would manipulate and build with individual atoms or molecules

== Computing ==
- Assembler (computing), a computer program which translates assembly language to machine language
  - Assembly language, a more readable interpretation of a processor's machine code, allowing easier understanding and programming by humans, sometimes erroneously referenced as 'assembler' after the program which translates it

== Other uses ==
- a worker on an assembly line

== See also ==
- Assemble (disambiguation)
- Assembly (disambiguation)
- Constructor (disambiguation)
