= Popular assembly =

Direct democratic institution

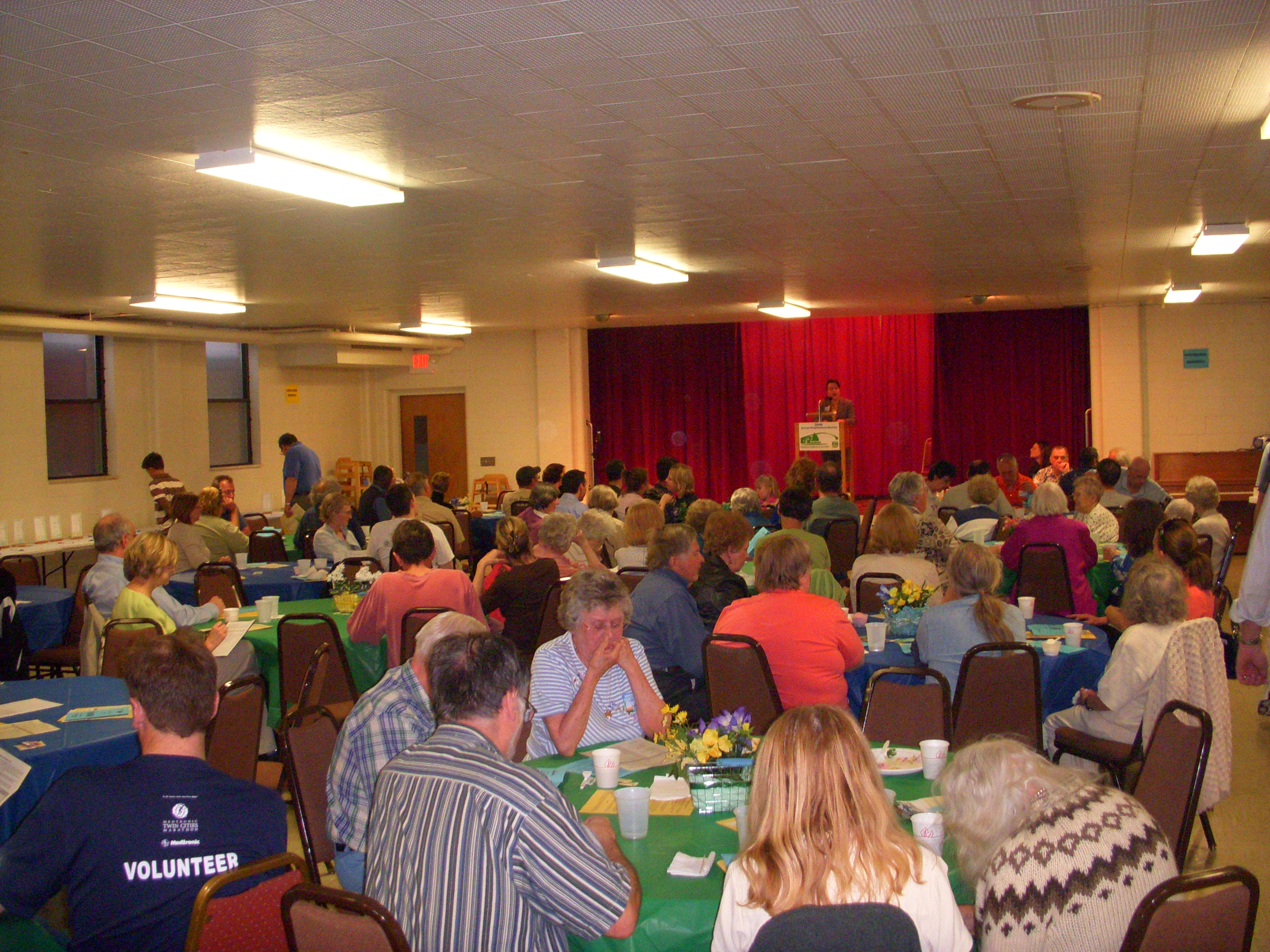
A neighborhood meeting in Minneapolis

A popular assembly (or people's assembly) is a gathering called to address issues of importance to participants. Popular assemblies tend to be freely open to participation, in contrast to elected assemblies and randomly-selected citizens' assemblies, and are a form of direct democracy. Some popular assemblies consist of people invited from a location, while others invite them from a workplace, industry, educational establishment or protest movement. Some are called to address a specific issue, while others have a wider scope.

The term is often used to describe gatherings that address, what participants feel are, the effects of a democratic deficit in representative democratic systems. Sometimes assemblies are created to form an alternative power structure, other times they work with other forms of government.

== Overview ==
Popular assemblies have a long history. The most famous example in ancient times is the Athenian democracy, where an assembly open to all male citizens was the highest decision-making body in the city-state. A few types of popular assembly dating from pre-modern times have survived and continued to hold binding decision-making powers in the present day, such as the town meetings of New England and the Landsgemeinden in Switzerland. Popular assemblies have also arisen during periods of revolutionary turmoil, such as the Russian revolutions in 1905 and in 1917, as well as Catalonia in 1936 and Hungary in 1956. However, this form of direct democracy has faced some skepticism from the 19th century onward, with claims that it is impractical to gather all the citizens of a modern state into an assembly.

Local meetings are common in modern times, but usually only have a consultative role. Graham Smith argues:

[S]uch public meetings are a poor imitation of Athenian practice: self-selection leads to unequal participation; participants exercise minimal popular control; there is little time for citizens to develop considered judgements, and so on.

Participatory budgeting, first developed in Porto Alegre, Brazil during the 1990s, uses popular assemblies as part of its direct democratic approach of allocating part of the local budget. Beginning in 2011, some protest movements such as the anti-austerity movement in Spain and Occupy movement have used assemblies of their participants to guide their decision-making. In some places like Jackson, Mississippi, popular assemblies have been vehicles for organizing local projects and campaigns. In academic writings, the devolution of power to local popular assemblies has been advocated by Murray Bookchin, Benjamin Barber and Frank M. Bryan.

== Traditional and historical examples ==
=== Athens ===
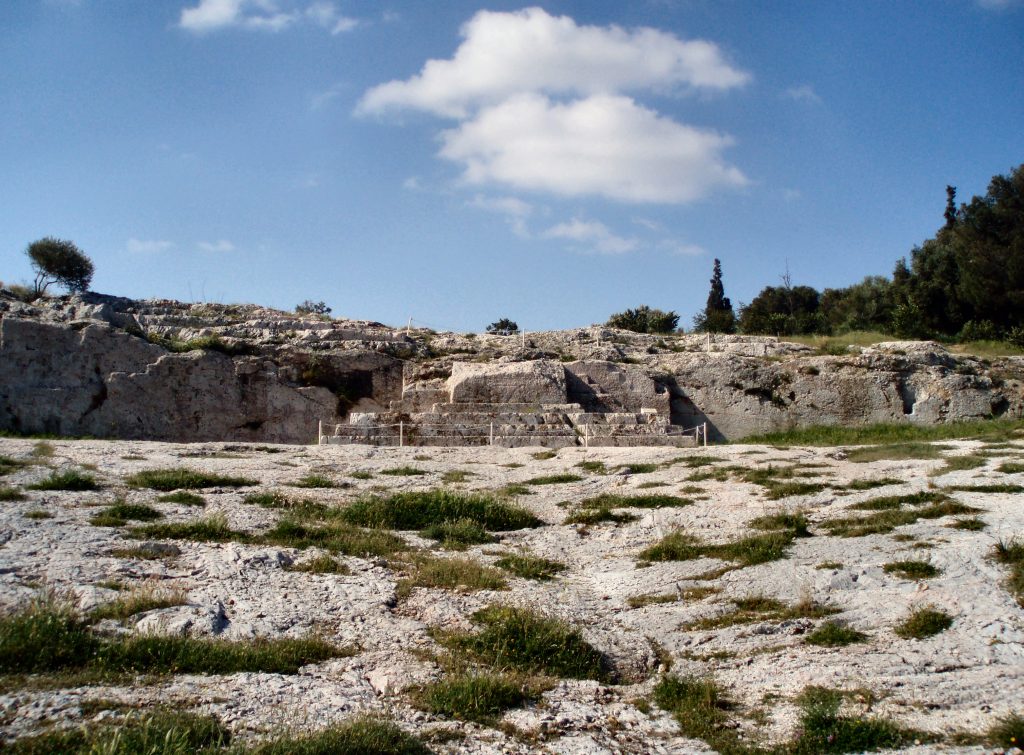
The Pnyx, the meeting place for the Athenian popular assembly

In Athenian democracy the ecclesia was the assembly which was open to all male citizens, about 30 percent of the city-state's adult population. The assembly could attract large audiences: 6,000 citizens might have attended in Athens during the fifth century BC out of the estimated 30,000–60,000 eligible citizens.

The assembly was responsible for declaring war, military strategy and electing the strategoi and other officials. It had the final say on legislation and the right to call magistrates to account after their year of office. The reforms of Solon gave them responsibility for nominating and electing magistrates (archons), though this had been replaced by 487 BC with sortition by lot. The assembly was supervised by the boule, a council of 400–500, whose most important role was to prepare the assembly's agenda. The boule was selected by soritition, among wealthy men above the age of 30.

=== Rome ===
Popular assemblies had a role in the government of the Roman Kingdom and the Roman Republic. In the latter, reflecting the Roman view that the people were the source of political power, assemblies had the highest official authority and the final say on laws and appointments. In practice, they were heavily controlled by the magistrates who summoned and presided over them, reducing them to instead being one of three interlinked branches of the Republic alongside the magistrates and the Roman Senate. These assemblies did not initiate or debate proposals, but listened to statements from appointed speakers and voted on proposals. In contrast to the assemblies, the Senate had few official powers, but was effectively the Republic's principle institution of political debate.

The oldest assembly was the Curiate Assembly, which was founded during the Kingdom. It did not operate on a one man, one vote principle. Instead, each citizen was assigned to a grouping called a curia, and majorities of participants in a majority of curiae were necessary to approve a decision, regardless on whether it was supported by an overall majority of participants. The Centuriate Assembly and Tribal Assembly developed later and operated with a similar system but based on different groupings. Assemblies were dominated by the wealthier classes, as only they could devote time to participating, and they were overrepresented further by the grouping-based voting systems.

The Curiate Assembly was already largely ceremonial in the middle of the Republican period, and the late Republic saw a decline of the assemblies' roles. Their last effective powers were abolished during the Roman Empire, with the second Roman emperor, Tiberius, transferring them to the Senate. Frank Abbott attributes their decline to the transformation of the Roman state from a city-state to an empire; they no longer represented its population and representing the rest of the empire was impractical.

=== Philippines ===
In barangays (transl. village) in the Philippines, barangay assemblies are mandated by the Local Government Code every six months. Starting in 2019, the government set these on every March and October. The law mandates assemblies where residents of a barangay in the last six months, Filipino citizens at least 15 years old or older, and registered as members of the barangay assembly, are to take part. In 2019, 97% of barangays conducted barangay assemblies.

=== Switzerland ===
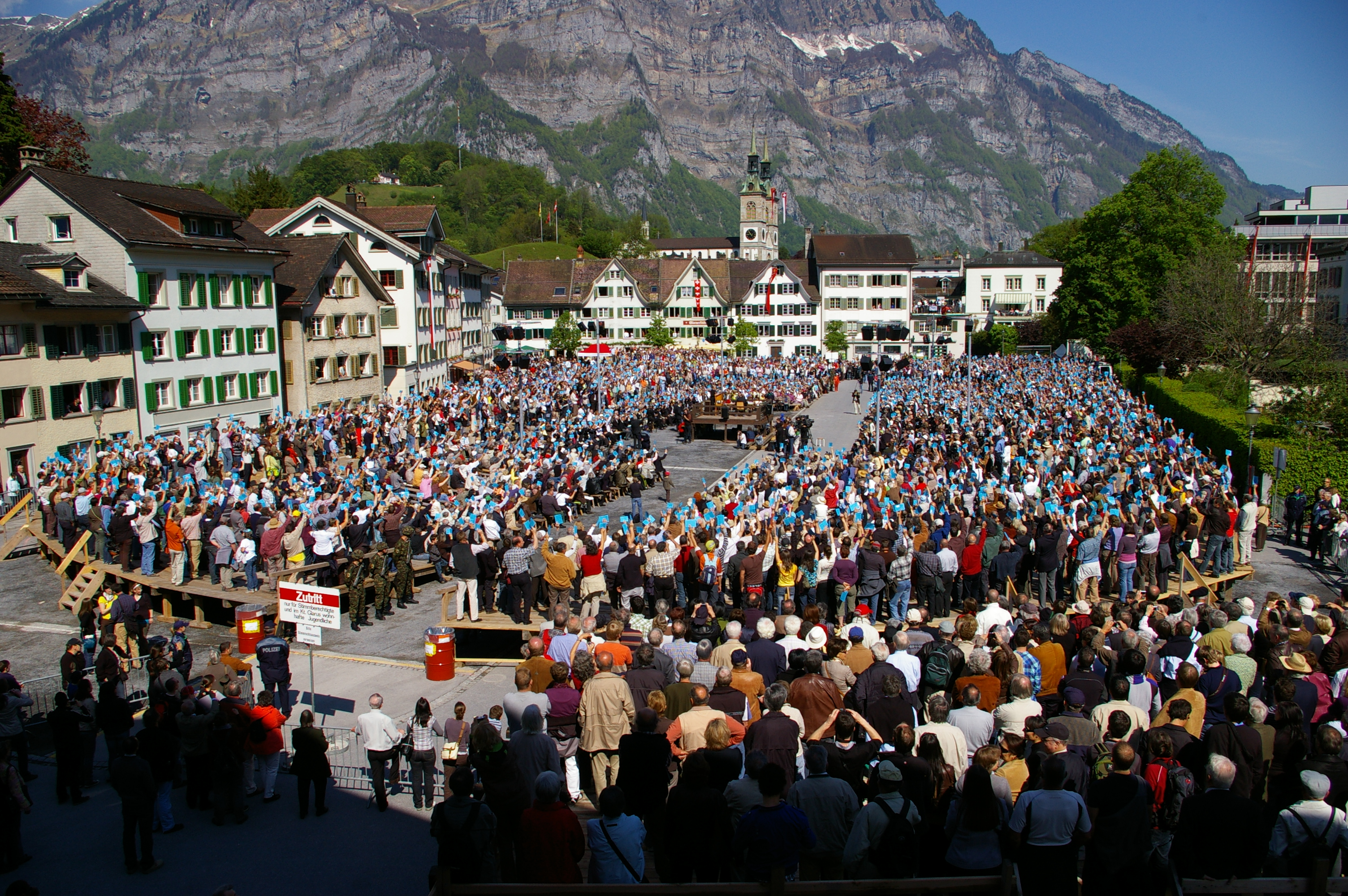
Landsgemeinde in Glarus, 2009

Two cantons in Switzerland – Appenzell Innerrhoden and Glarus – retain a Landsgemeinde, a traditional open assembly with decision-making powers. The tradition has continuity back to the late Middle Ages, first recorded in the context of the formation of the Old Swiss Confederacy. Eight other cantons historically had a Landsgemeinde but their importance declined in the 19th and 20th centuries and they came to be seen as an outdated rural tradition. Most were abolished and the remaining two have undergone some changes, such as allowing women to participate. They remain a characteristic symbol of Swiss democracy. A few districts (between municipal and cantonal levels) in Grisons and Schwyz also have a Lansgemeinde.

The retained Landsgemeinden each co-exist with an elected council and their powers and role vary according to the cantonal or local government's constitution. Approving a proposal requires a majority vote and is typically done with a show of hands. The lack of a secret ballot is controversial, including the question as to whether it is compatible with Article 21.3 of the Universal Declaration of Human Rights. Proposals to reform the Landsgemeinden that have been discussed but not implemented include secret electronic ballots and improving the preliminary debate.

Popular assemblies are more common at a municipal level. The vast majority of small municipalities in Switzerland feature a town meeting (Gemeindeversammlung) as part of their governance structure, though they are rare in municipalities with a population over 10,000. As of 2020, some of the larger municipalities with a town meeting include Rapperswil-Jona, Baar and Horgen, each with a population in the 20,000-30,000 range.

=== New England ===
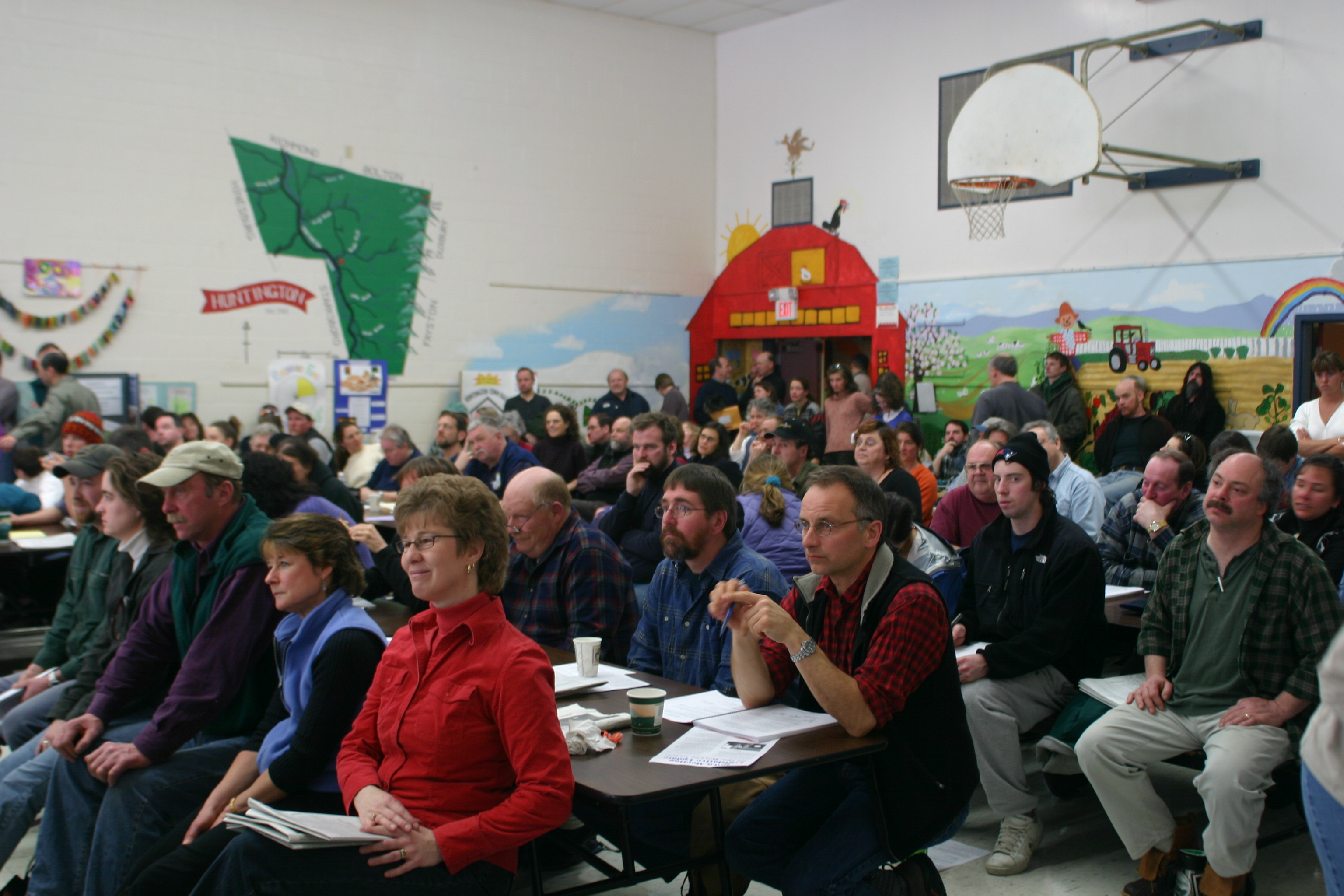
A town meeting in Vermont

The town meeting is the traditional governing body of the New England town, open to all adult residents to discuss and vote on the major issues of town government. It was founded in the colonial era as an outgrowth of church meetings, which then became secularized as a purely governmental meeting. Although larger towns have since moved to more representative forms of government, it is still widely practiced in smaller and more rural communities. They commonly meet once a year on a Tuesday in March. Their exact role and functioning can vary considerably by town, as well as by state.

Since the turn of the nineteenth century, political scientists have characterized New England's town meetings as a notable example of direct democracy. In 1831, political philosopher Alexis de Tocqueville visited several townships in Massachusetts, and his remarks in the first volume of Democracy in America (1835) praise their democratic and localist culture, as did John Stuart Mill. Modern advocates of deliberative democracy, such as James Fishkin, have presented the town meeting as a setting of "empowered participation" in which thoughtful deliberation between all participating individuals can coexist with a sense of engaged citizenship and responsibility for solving local problems.

Others question their ability to represent the population. Jane Mansbridge and Donald L. Robinson have argued that town meetings in Vermont and Massachusetts feature extremely low turnout in part because they last for a full working day, thus overrepresentating seniors and non-working residents in the meetings. Mansbridge also notes differences in participation on the basis of education and class when conflicts arise, writing that "the face-to-face assembly lets those who have no trouble speaking defend their interests; it does not give the average citizen comparable protection." Feminist critics have also identified mixed results in town meetings. While women's rates of attendance at town meetings was nearly equal relative to men's, their participation in discussion relative to men declined as the size of the town increased.

The similarly named town hall meeting, where politicians meet with their constituents and discuss issues, is named after and meant to resemble the town meeting.

== Modern examples ==
=== Argentine economic crisis (1999–2002) ===
During the Argentine economic crisis (1999–2002) many Argentinian citizens started engaging and organising their actions through assemblies.

After closure, the Chilvert printing press was occupied by workers who organised through an assembly. Within weeks of being reopened as a workers cooperative Chilvert printed a book called Que son las Asembleas Populares? or What are the Popular Assemblies?, a collection of articles written by renowned intellectuals Miguel Bonasso, Stella Calloni and Rafael Bielsa as well as workers and participants in the assemblies.

As with other workplaces, the print factory was saved from closure by the actions of a popular assembly. The military and police were blocked from entering the factory after the popular assembly of Pompeya called on barrio residents to protect the workplace. Individual police officers expressed their support for the workers and the popular assembly and successfully petitioned the judge to rescind his order to seize the factory.

The assemblies movement is reported to have spiked in power rapidly and fallen from any major significance within months. It is reported that Grigera summing up his analysis of the asambleas states

no matter how progressive or "advanced" the social relationships, forms of decision-making and activities of asambleas are said to be, their small scale, lack of influence and flawed coordination between themselves and other movements render this movement unable to overcome very narrow limitations.

=== Mexico ===
The Local Autonomous Governments (GALs), known until 2023 as the Rebel Zapatista Autonomous Municipalities, are a set of de facto autonomous municipalities in Chiapas, Mexico. They are composed of five regions, in total having a population of around 360,000 people as of 2018. The communities form federations with other communities to create higher-level units. At a local level, people attend a popular assembly of around 300 families in which anyone over the age of 12 can participate in decision-making. These assemblies strive to reach a consensus, but are willing to fall back to a majority vote.

Elsewhere in Mexico, the town of Cherán saw armed citizens kick out the corrupt police, drug cartels, and mayor in 2011. Since then they have adopted a system of popular assemblies to govern the town, which is somewhat independent of the central government.

=== Occupy Movement ===
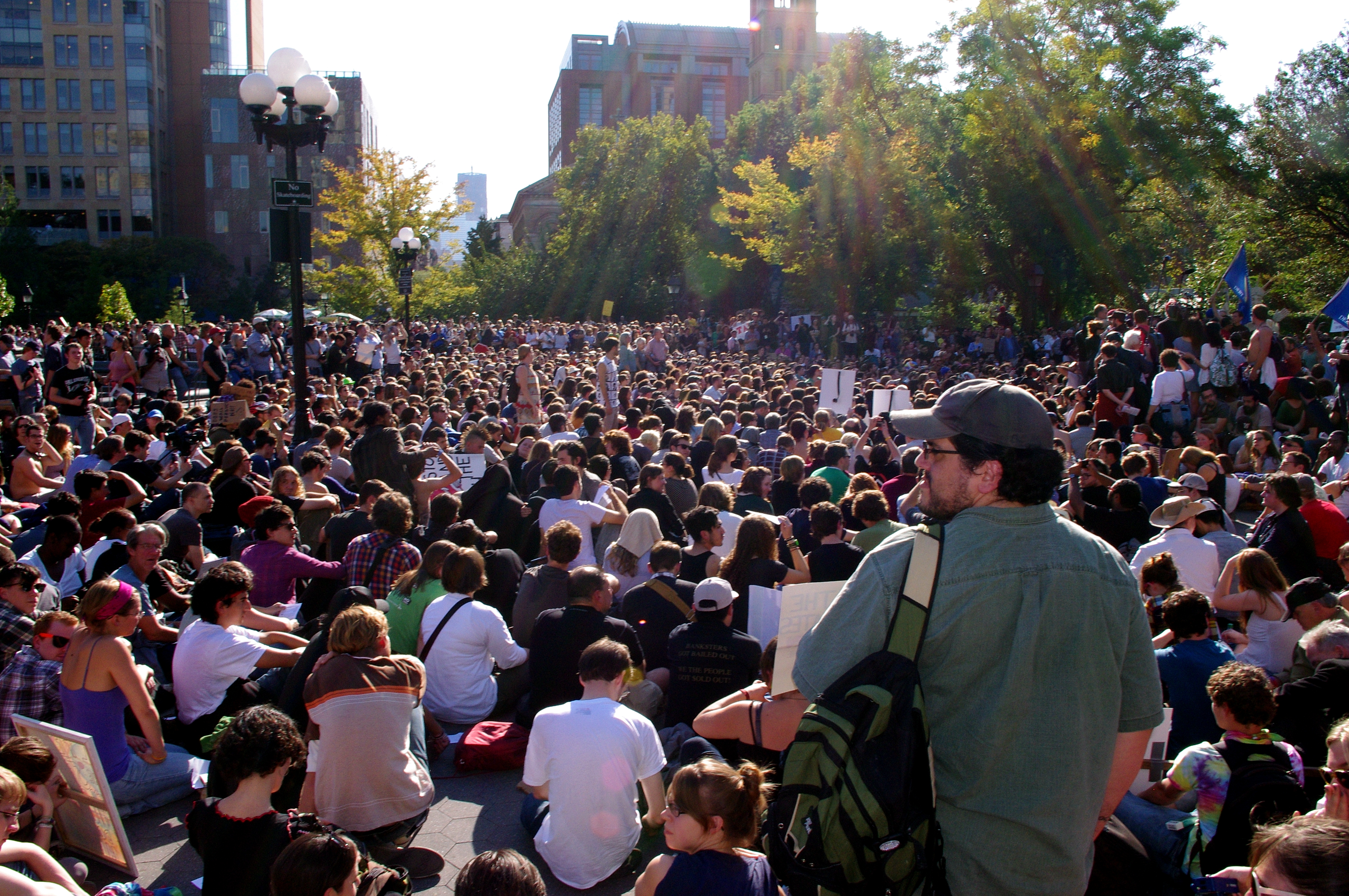
A meeting in Washington Square Park on October 8, 2011

The 2011 Occupy Movement used assemblies of its participants, known as general assemblies (GAs), as its principal decision-making bodies. Most assemblies had a facilitator to preside over the debate. One key feature of the GAs was the use of hand signals to offer feedback on an opinion that was being voiced, as well as other messages such as "clarify". They also used smaller working groups to provide in-depth discussion. Larger assemblies restricted speaking to designated spokespeople for the working groups, but other participants could still show their opinion with hand signals. The GAs operated on the principle of seeking consensus rather than a simple majority.

Participants in the assembly typically enjoyed their experience at the GAs, especially in the first month of the protests, though in later months some but not all participants expressed disillusionment. Anthropologist David Graeber has suggested the use of assemblies was a key reason why the Occupy movement gained momentum, in contrast to many other attempts to start a movement in the aftermath of the Great Recession, which used more standard methods of organization but which all failed to get off the ground.

There has been some criticism of the model, especially concerning the time it takes to form consensus about specific demands. The specific forms used at the London GA have been criticized for the fact that they allow even a single participant to block consensus, in contrast to GAs in the United States where some require a minimum of 10% of participants to block a motion in order to prevent it being passed. Nathan Schneider has suggested that an issue with assemblies is that to some extent they are incompatible with traditional political groups such as parties, unions and civil society NGOs – which is problematic as they need to liaise with these groups to get their message actualized.

=== Syria ===
The Democratic Autonomous Administration of North and East Syria, also known as Rojava, is an administration whose policy ambitions to a large extent on democratic libertarian socialist ideology of democratic confederalism. The theory was outlined by Abdullah Öcalan, who was influenced by Murray Bookchin. They have been described as pursuing a model of economy that blends co-operative and market enterprise, through a system of popular assemblies to provide minority, cultural and religious representation. The DAANES has by far the highest average salaries and standard of living throughout Syria, with salaries being twice as large as in regime-controlled Syria; following the collapse of the Syrian pound the DAANES doubled salaries to maintain inflation, and allow for good wages.

=== See also ===
- Bolivarian Circles
- European Assembly for Climate Justice 2010
- 15M movement assemblies 2011–2015

== Outcomes ==
It is unclear if traditional popular assemblies such as those in Switzerland offer better inclusivity and fosters a higher level of participation than more conventional secret-ballot voting methods. Paul Lucardie (2014) notes for example that:

"Evidence suggests that attendance at assemblies in Appenzell and Glarus, as well as most town meetings in Vermont and possibly also in ancient Athens, has always been limited to roughly twenty per cent of the citizenry."

== See also ==
- Autonomism
- Anarchism
- Citizens' assembly
- Deliberative democracy
- Democratic confederalism
- Direct democracy
- General assembly
- Landsgemeinde
- Libertarian socialism
- Participatory democracy
- Referendum
- Spokescouncil
- Workers' council
- Workplace democracy
