= Construct =

Construct, Constructs or constructs may refer to:

- Construct (information technology), a collection of logic components forming an interactive agent or environment
  - Language construct
- Construct (Dark Tranquillity album), 2013
- Construct (VNV Nation album), 2025
- Construct (philosophy), a hypothetical object whose phenomenal existence depends upon a subject's mind
- Construct (python library), a software library used for data-structuring
- Construct (software), an HTML5-based game creator
- Construct state, an Afro-Asiatic noun-form
- DNA construct, a segment of nucleic acid, created artificially, for transplantation into a target cell or tissue
- Social construct
- Construct (psychology), a label used in behavioural sciences for a domain of behaviors
- an alternative name for a concrete category
- biological creations appearing in the Wheel of Time series of fantasy novels

== See also ==
- Construction
- Construx, a brand of plastic building toys
