= Gabriel Graciani (footballer, born 1993) =

Argentine footballer

Personal information
- Full name: Gabriel Maximiliano Graciani
- Date of birth: 28 November 1993 (age 32)
- Place of birth: Bovril, Argentina
- Height: 1.80 m (5 ft 11 in)
- Position: Right midfielder

Team information
- Current team: Ñublense
- Number: 8

Senior career*
Years	Team	Apps	(Gls)
2011–2014	Colón	96	(8)
2014–2017	Estudiantes	18	(0)
2015	→ Independiente (loan)	6	(0)
2015–2016	→ Atlético de Rafaela (loan)	25	(4)
2017	→ Patronato (loan)	12	(1)
2017–2018	San Martín	14	(1)
2018–2019	Olimpo	24	(3)
2019–2021	Sarmiento	56	(4)
2022–2023	Instituto	78	(16)
2024–	Ñublense	55	(10)
- * Club domestic league appearances and goals as of 19 November 2026

Gabriel Maximiliano Graciani (born 28 November 1993) is an Argentine professional footballer who plays as a right midfielder for Chilean club Ñublense.

== Career ==
Graciani's first club were Colón, with whom he made ninety-seven appearances and scored eight goals in the Argentine Primera División. His first goal came during his third career appearance in a home loss to Gimnasia y Esgrima on 25 February 2011. Graciani also scored goals on his domestic cup and continental cup debuts, netting in a win over Talleres in the Copa Argentina in November 2011 and against Racing Club in the Copa Sudamericana in August 2012. On 13 July 2014 Graciani joined fellow Primera División team Estudiantes. He made his Estudiantes debut on 11 August versus Arsenal de Sarandí.

2015 saw Graciani leave Estudiantes on loan twice. First was on 8 February to Independiente where he featured six times before returning. Second on 30 June to Atlético de Rafaela where he remained until 2016 after four goals in twenty-five appearances. He returned to Estudiantes for the 2016 – 2017 campaign and featured seven times, but was loaned out for a third time midway through the season to Patronato. He scored on his Patronato debut against Arsenal de Sarandí on 10 March 2017. In September 2017 Graciani left Estudiantes permanently to play for San Martín of Primera B Nacional.

San Martín won promotion in 2017 – 2018, though Graciani subsequently departed to join Olimpo; a recently relegated Primera B Nacional team.

In 2024, he moved abroad and signed with Chilean club Ñublense.

== Personal life ==
Graciani is the nephew and namesake of former footballer Gabriel Graciani.

== Career statistics ==
As of 11 September 2018.

Club statistics
Club	Season	League			Cup (Note: Includes the Copa Argentina)		League Cup		Continental (Note: Includes the Copa Libertadores and Copa Sudamericana)		Other		Total	
Club	Season	Division	Apps	Goals	Apps	Goals	Apps	Goals	Apps	Goals	Apps	Goals	Apps	Goals
Colón	2010–11	Primera División	9	1	0	0	—		—		0	0	9	1
Colón	2011–12	Primera División	24	1	1	1	—		—		0	0	25	2
Colón	2012–13	Primera División	33	0	1	0	—		2 (Note: Two appearances in 2012 Copa Sudamericana)	1 (Note: One goal in 2012 Copa Sudamericana)	0	0	36	1
Colón	2013–14	Primera División	30	6	0	0	—		—		1 (Note: One appearance in 2013–14 Argentine Primera División play-offs)	0	31	6
Colón	Total		96	8	2	1	—		2	1	1	0	101	10
Estudiantes	2014	Primera División	11	0	0	0	—		1 (Note: One appearance in 2014 Copa Sudamericana)	0	0	0	12	0
Estudiantes	2015	Primera División	0	0	0	0	—		0	0	0	0	0	0
Estudiantes	2016	Primera División	0	0	0	0	—		0	0	0	0	0	0
Estudiantes	2016–17	Primera División	7	0	3	1	—		1 (Note: One appearance in 2016 Copa Sudamericana)	0	0	0	11	1
Estudiantes	2017–18	Primera División	0	0	0	0	—		0	0	0	0	0	0
Estudiantes	Total		18	0	3	1	—		2	0	0	0	23	1
Independiente (loan)	2015	Primera División	6	0	1	0	—		0	0	0	0	7	0
Atlético de Rafaela (loan)	2015	Primera División	14	1	2	0	—		—		0	0	16	1
Atlético de Rafaela (loan)	2016	Primera División	11	3	0	0	—		—		0	0	11	3
Atlético de Rafaela (loan)	Total		25	4	2	0	—		—		0	0	27	4
Patronato (loan)	2016–17	Primera División	12	1	0	0	—		—		0	0	12	1
San Martín	2017–18	Primera B Nacional	14	1	0	0	—		—		0	0	14	1
Olimpo	2018–19	Primera B Nacional	2	0	0	0	—		—		0	0	2	0
Career total			173	14	8	2	—		4	1	1	0	186	17
