= List of algebraic constructions =

An algebraic construction is a method by which an algebraic entity is defined or derived from another.

Instances include:

- Cayley–Dickson construction
- Proj construction
- Grothendieck group
- Gelfand–Naimark–Segal construction
- Ultraproduct
- ADHM construction
- Burnside ring
- Simplicial set
- Fox derivative
- Mapping cone (homological algebra)
- Prym variety
- Todd class
- Adjunction (field theory)
- Vaughan Jones construction
- Strähle construction
- Coset construction
- Plus construction
- Algebraic K-theory
- Gelfand–Naimark–Segal construction
- Stanley–Reisner ring construction
- Quotient ring construction
- Ward's twistor construction
- Hilbert symbol
- Hilbert's arithmetic of ends
- Colombeau's construction
- Vector bundle
- Integral monoid ring construction
- Integral group ring construction
- Category of Eilenberg–Moore algebras
- Kleisli category
- Adjunction (field theory)
- Lindenbaum–Tarski algebra construction
- Freudenthal magic square
- Stone–Čech compactification
