= European Assembly for Climate Justice =

The European Assembly for Climate Justice was a free and open event for all that took place in Brussels from 26 to 29 November 2010. The Assembly was attended by over 250 people from 11 European countries: the UK, Denmark, Russia, Belgium, Turkey, Germany, Finland, Sweden, Spain, Netherlands, and France.

The assembly was organized by European and Belgium environmental groups including: Friends of the Earth, Climat et Justice Sociale, Climate Justice Action Belgium/Climate Action Camp Belgium, and La Via Campesina.

== Motivation ==
The event was inspired by La Via Campesina call for "Thousands of Cancuns" in response to the UN climate negotiations taking place in Cancun. The call was due to fear that the UN negotiations would be used by big business and industrialized countries to further their own agendas and not actually improve the way the world's population treats the environment.

== Events ==
=== Friday 26th ===
Critical mass bike ride throughout Brussels, followed by group social event

=== Saturday 27th ===
Workshop, plenary and all day conference

=== Sunday 28th ===
Plenary and workshops to discuss the movements plans, actions, and mobilizations. Followed by “Sing for the Climate” event, hosted by the Belgium Climate Coalition.

=== Monday 29th ===
Final day evaluation meeting
