= Gabriel Graciani (footballer, born 1982) =

Argentine footballer and manager

Personal information
- Full name: Gabriel Reinaldo Graciani
- Date of birth: 16 February 1982 (age 44)
- Place of birth: Sir Leonard, Argentina
- Height: 1.80 m (5 ft 11 in)
- Position: Right-back

Team information
- Current team: Patronato (reserve manager)

Youth career
- Deportivo Bovril
- Patronato

Senior career*
| Years | Team | Apps | (Gls) |
| 2001–2015 | Patronato | 258 | (10) |
| 2016 | Belgrano de Paraná | 31 | (0) |
| 2017 | Deportivo Bovril | | |
| Total | | 289 | (10) |

Managerial career
- 2019–: Patronato (reserve manager)
- 2022: Patronato (interim)
- * Club domestic league appearances and goals

Gabriel Reinaldo Graciani (born 16 February 1982) is an Argentine football manager and former professional footballer who played as a right-back. He is currently the manager of Patronato's reserves.

== Playing career ==
Graciani spent the majority of his senior career with Patronato. He made his debut in Torneo Argentino A during 2001–02, a season which ended with relegation to Torneo Argentino B. Patronato remained in tier three until 2008, during which time Graciani had scored six goals in ninety-eight matches. He stayed with the club in Primera B Nacional until 2015, departing after two hundred and fifty-eight appearances and ten goals. His final season, 2015, ended with promotion to the Argentine Primera División. Graciani's final clubs were Belgrano (2016) and Deportivo Bovril (2017), a team he played for during his youth career.

== Coaching career ==
In June 2019, Graciani was appointed reserve manager by former club Patronato; having previously been a youth assistant coach there.

== Personal life ==
Graciani is the uncle and namesake of current footballer Gabriel Graciani.

== Honours ==
Patronato

- Torneo Argentino B: 2007–08
- Torneo Argentino A: 2009–10
