= Stella Calloni =

Argentine journalist and writer

- Born: Stella Manuela Juliana Calloni Leguizamón; 19 June 1935 (age 91); Pueblo Leguizamón, La Paz Department, Argentina
- Occupations: Journalist, writer

Stella Manuela Juliana Calloni Leguizamón (born 19 June 1935) is an Argentine journalist and writer specializing in international politics, whose investigative work focuses on Latin American military dictatorships and related political processes. Her books Los años del lobo: la Operación Cóndor (1999) and Operación Cóndor, pacto criminal (2006) gather parts of her research into the campaign known as Operation Condor.

== Biography ==
Stella Calloni was born on 19 June 1935 in the small town of Pueblo Leguizamón, in La Paz Department, Entre Ríos Province. She attended school in her home province and then moved to Buenos Aires to complete her education. There she linked up with left-wing militants and intellectuals such as Zelmar Michelini, Néstor Taboada Terán, and Miguel Ángel Asturias, and began to write for magazines such as Política Internacional and Cristianismo y revolución.

She started covering international news stories during the 1970 Chilean presidential election. During the civic-military dictatorship that ruled Argentina from 1976 to 1983, she went into exile in Mexico and Panama. In those years she worked as editor of the magazine Formato Dieciséis, and as a screenwriter for the University of Panama's University Film Experimental Group.

She is a contributor to the Voltaire Network, created at the initiative of Thierry Meyssan, editor of El Día Latinoamericano, and a South American correspondent for La Jornada, both based in Mexico City.

Throughout her professional career, she has interviewed numerous heads of state, such as Fidel Castro, Hugo Chávez, Evo Morales, Luiz Inácio Lula da Silva, Rafael Correa, Daniel Ortega, Salvador Allende, Omar Torrijos, Jimmy Carter, Yasser Arafat, Muammar Gaddafi, and Felipe González.

== Awards and recognition ==
- José Martí Latin American Journalism Award (1986)
- TEA Journalism School Award (2003)
- Félix Elmuza Distinction from the Union of Journalists of Cuba (2006)
- Rubén Darío Order of Cultural Independence (2008)
- Rodolfo Walsh Award from the National University of La Plata (2012)
- Outstanding Personality in the Field of Human Rights from the Buenos Aires City Legislature
- Cultural Ambassador ad honorem by disposition of the Governor of Entre Ríos (2014)

In 2013, the journalists Julio Ferrer and Héctor Bernardo published a biographical narrative of Fidel Castro, assembled from a series of interviews with Stella Calloni, with a preface by Castro himself.

In 2022, she was honored by the Periodistas Argentinas collective, along with 14 other media professionals, as a role model and inspiration. This recognition was presented on 8 March, within the framework of International Women's Day.

== Selected publications ==
- Torrijos y el Canal de Panamá [Torrijos and the Panama Canal] (in Spanish). Buenos Aires: Editora Nuestra América. 1974. OCLC 35781117.
- Carta a Leroi Jones y otros poemas [Letter to Leroi Jones and Other Poems] (in Spanish). Panamá: Ediciones Formato Dieciseis. 1983. OCLC 11312241.
- La 'guerra encubierta' contra Contadora: Centroamérica, enero-diciembre de 1983 [The 'Covert War' Against Contadora: Central America, January–December 1983] (in Spanish). Panama: Centro de Capacitación Social. 1984. OCLC 10521033. Co-authored with Rafael Cribari.
- Nicaragua, el tercer día [Nicaragua, The Third Day] (in Spanish). Buenos Aires: Ediciones Noé. 1987. OCLC 17639707.
- Los riesgos de la soberanía [The Risks of Sovereignty] (in Spanish). Buenos Aires: Ideas, Letras, Arte en la Crisis. 1988. OCLC 252942140.
- Panamá: pequeña Hiroshima [Panama: Little Hiroshima] (in Spanish) (1st ed.). Mexico: Publicaciones Mexicanas. 1991. ISBN 9789686352207. OCLC 29549788.
- Memorias de trashumante [Migrant Memories] (in Spanish). Buenos Aires: Papeles de Coghlan. 1998. ISBN 9789879954843. OCLC 760393682. Poetry.
- Los años del lobo: Operación Cóndor [The Years of the Wolf: Operation Condor] (in Spanish). Buenos Aires: Peña Lillo – Continente. 1999. ISBN 9789507540547. OCLC 807660851. Prologue by Adolfo Pérez Esquivel.
- Argentina: de la crisis a la resistencia [Argentina: From Crisis to Resistance] (in Spanish). Mexico: La Jornada Ediciones. 2002. ISBN 9789686719727. OCLC 52618873.
- Qué son las asambleas populares [What are Popular Assemblies] (in Spanish). Buenos Aires: Continente. 2002. ISBN 9789507540974. OCLC 250007942. Co-authored with Rafael Bielsa and Miguel Bonasso.
- La invasión a Iraq: guerra imperial y resistencia [The Invasion of Iraq: Imperial War and Resistance] (in Spanish). Buenos Aires: Ediciones Instituto Movilizador de Fondos Cooperativos. 2003. ISBN 9789508601438. OCLC 54494615. Co-authored with Víctor Ego Ducrot.
- Recolonización o independencia – América Latina en el siglo XXI [Recolonization and Independence – Latin America in the 21st Century] (in Spanish) (1st ed.). Buenos Aires: Grupo Editorial Norma. 2004. ISBN 9789875451971. OCLC 57922094. Co-authored with Víctor Ego Ducrot.
- Operación Cóndor: pacto criminal [Operation Condor: Criminal Pact] (in Spanish). Havana: Fondo Cultural del ALBA. 2006. ISBN 9789591900012. OCLC 216942037. Translated into German in 2010 with the title Operación Cóndor: Lateinamerika im Griff der Todesschwadronen.
- Xamán: un ejemplo de impunidad dentro del genocidio guatemalteco y experiencias comparadas de países latinoamericanos [Xamán: An Example of Impunity Within the Guatemalan Genocide and Comparative Experiences of Latin American Countries] (in Spanish). San Sebastán: Tercera Prensa. 2006. ISBN 9788487303920. OCLC 1025413468. Co-authored with Xavier Goikolea Ameraun.
- Los subverdes (in Spanish). Buenos Aires: Patagonia. 2007. ISBN 9789872232771. OCLC 552977777.. Poetry. 1st edition c. 1976.
- Evo en la mira: CIA y DEA en Bolivia [Evo in the Crosshairs: CIA and DEA in Bolivia] (in Spanish). Buenos Aires: Punto de Encuentro. 2009. ISBN 9789871567119. OCLC 837382018. Prologue by Adolfo Pérez Esquivel.
- Operación Cóndor: 40 años después [Operation Condor: 40 Years Later] (PDF) (in Spanish). International Center for the Promotion of Human Rights. October 2015. ISBN 9789873720420. OCLC 1037097323. Co-authored with Baltasar Garzón and Grègoire Champenois.
- Mujeres de fuego: historias de amor, arte y militancia [Women of Fire: Stories of Love, Art, and Militancy] (in Spanish). Buenos Aires: Peña Lillo Ediciones Continente. 2016. ISBN 9789507546044. OCLC 1045293428. Interviews with Gloria Gaitán, Fanny Edelman, Gladys Marín, Danielle Mitterrand, Nélida Piñon, Nidia Díaz, Rigoberta Menchú, Sarah Méndez, and Olga Orozco. Biographical stories about Manuela Sáenz, Frida Kahlo, and Rosario Castellanos.
- Donde baila la tierra - Antología poética [Where the Earth Dances – Poetic Anthology] (in Spanish) (1st ed.). Continente. 2019. ISBN 978-950-754-652-5. Poetry.
