= Avengers Assemble =

"Avengers, assemble!" is the rallying cry for the Marvel Comics superhero team the Avengers, as well as its Marvel Cinematic Universe counterpart.

Avengers Assemble may refer to:

- The Avengers (2012 film), a 2012 superhero film titled Marvel Avengers Assemble in the United Kingdom and Ireland
  - The Avengers (soundtrack), the soundtrack for the 2012 film The Avengers
  - The "Avengers assemble" scene in Avengers: Endgame
- Avengers Assemble (comics), a Marvel Comics title launched in March 2012
- "Avengers Assemble" (event), a Marvel Comics crossover storyline published in 2022
- Avengers Assemble (TV series), a 2013 animated TV series that aired on Disney XD
- Avengers Assemble, a combined volume title of Avengers (1998) #1–11 and Annual '98
- Avengers Assemble, the cover title of Avengers (2018) #63
- "Avengers Assemble", the two-part premiere episode of the 1999 animated series The Avengers: United They Stand
- "Avengers Assemble!", the final episode of the 2010 animated series The Avengers: Earth's Mightiest Heroes!
- Avengers Assembled!, a 1984 role-playing game supplement for the Marvel Super Heroes role-playing game
