= Constructor =

Constructor may refer to:

== Science and technology ==
- Constructor (object-oriented programming), object-organizing method
- Constructors (Formula One), person or group who builds the chassis of a car in auto racing, especially Formula One
- Constructor, an entity in constructor theory, a theory of everything developed by physicist David Deutsch in 2012

== Other uses ==
- Constructor (video game), a 1997 PC game by Acclaim, the prequel of Constructor: Street Wars
- Constructor Group AS, a Norwegian-based group specialising in shelving, racking and storage systems
- Construction worker, a builder, especially a construction company or a manager of builders

== See also ==
- Assembler (disambiguation)
