= Constructivism =

Constructivism may refer to:

== Art and architecture ==
- Constructivism (art), an early 20th-century artistic movement that extols art as a practice for social purposes
- Constructivist architecture, an architectural movement in the Soviet Union in the 1920s and 1930s
- British Constructivists, a group of British artists who were active between 1951 and 1955.

== Education ==
- Constructivism (philosophy of education), a theory about the nature of learning that focuses on how humans make meaning from their experiences
- Constructionism (learning theory)
- Constructivism in science education
- Constructivist teaching methods, based on constructivist learning theory

== Mathematics ==
- Constructivism (philosophy of mathematics), a logic for founding mathematics that accepts only objects that can be effectively constructed
- Constructivist set theory
- Constructivist type theory

== Philosophy ==
- Constructivism (philosophy of mathematics), a philosophical view that asserts the necessity of constructing a mathematical object to prove that it exists
- Constructivism (philosophy of education), a theory that suggests that learners do not passively acquire knowledge through direct instruction; instead, they construct their understanding through experiences and social interaction, integrating new information with their existing knowledge
- Constructivism (philosophy of science), a philosophical view maintaining that science consists of mental constructs created as the result of measuring the natural world
- Moral constructivism or ethical constructivism, the view that moral facts are constructed rather than discovered

== Political and social sciences ==
- Constructivism (international relations), a theory that stresses the socially constructed character of international relations
- Constructivism (ethnic politics), a theory that ethnic identities are not unchanging entities and that political developments can shape which identities get activated
- Constructivist institutionalism
- Social constructivism, the view that human development is socially situated and knowledge is constructed through interaction with others

== Psychology ==
- Constructivism (psychological school), a psychological approach that assumes that human knowledge is active and constructive

== See also ==
- Constructionism (disambiguation)
- Constructive theology
- Constructive empiricism
- Deconstructivism, a movement of postmodern architecture from the 1980s
- Neuroconstructivism
- Transactionalism
