= Assemble (album) =

Studio album by Grown at Home
- Released: 6 July 2006
- Recorded: 2006
- Length: 39:12
- Label: Cash for Pigs Records CFP-CDA001
- Producer: Curig Huws and Grown at Home

Grown at Home chronology
The Sandwich EP (2004)	Assemble (2006)

Assemble is the debut full-length album recorded by the Stoke-based ska punk band Grown at Home. It was produced with Curig Huws.

The album was released by Cash for Pigs Records (a label founded for the sole purpose of releasing the band's first EP) on 6 July 2006 on compact disc.

== Liner notes ==
The inlay of the album contains fourteen hidden items and references including photographs of band members, messages from the band, a nod to "High Fives" (a song that was considered for the album but left unfinished) and a link to bassist Jay Phillips' personal website.

== Track listing ==
1. "My Pet Bomb"
2. "Three Strikes"
3. "Discuss This Item"
4. "Get Ready"
5. "Blaggin' It!"
6. "Kick in the Beer Can"
7. "How We Roll"
8. "Manners (Don't Cost a Thing)"
9. "Rise of the Idiots"
10. "Interlusion"
11. "Makes Me Sick"
12. "... And You're All Alone"
13. "Moving Forward" (formerly known as "Three of One")
