= Constructionism =

Constructionism may refer to

- Constructionism (learning theory), an educational philosophy developed by Seymour Papert
- Social constructionism, a theory of how social phenomena or objects of consciousness develop in social contexts
- Strict constructionism, a conservative type of legal or constitutional interpretation

== See also ==
- Constructivism (disambiguation)
