= La Paz Department, Entre Ríos =

La Paz Departamento La Paz
- Department
- Location of La Paz Department within Entre Ríos Province

- Location within Argentina
- Coordinates: 30.75°S 59.65°W
- Country: Argentina
- Province: Entre Ríos Province
- Seat: La Paz

Area
  - Total: 6,500 km^{2} (2,500 sq mi)

Population (2022)
  - Total: 75,407
  - Density: 12/km^{2} (30/sq mi)

The La Paz Department (in Spanish, Departamento La Paz) is an administrative subdivision (departamento) of the province of Entre Ríos, Argentina.
