= National Assembly (disambiguation) =

A national assembly is either a unicameral legislature, the lower house of a bicameral legislature, or both houses of a bicameral legislature together.

National Assembly may also refer to:

== Currently in use ==
- National Assembly (Afghanistan), the legislature of Afghanistan
- National Assembly (Cambodia), the lower house of the Cambodian parliament
- National Assembly (France), the lower house of the French parliament
- National Assembly of the Gambia, the unicameral legislative body of The Gambia
- National Assembly (Kenya)
- National Assembly (Madagascar), the lower legislative body of Madagascar
- National Assembly (Nigeria)
- National Assembly (Quebec), the unicameral legislative body of Quebec
- National Assembly (Republic of the Congo), the lower house of the Parliament of the Republic of the Congo
- National Assembly (Senegal), the unicameral legislative body of Senegal
- National Assembly (Serbia), the unicameral legislative body of Serbia
- National Assembly of South Africa, the lower house of the Parliament of South Africa, located in Cape Town.
- National Assembly (South Korea), the unicameral legislative body of South Korea
- National Assembly (Venezuela), de jure legislature for Venezuela
- National Assembly of Pakistan, the lower house of the Parliament of Pakistan

== Historically ==
- National Assembly (French Revolution), the Assemblée Nationale existing from June 13 to July 9, 1789, formed from the Estates General
- National Constituent Assembly (France), the Assemblée Nationale constituante existing from July 9, 1789, to September 30, 1791, formed from the National Assembly
- (National) Legislative Assembly (France), the legislative body of the limited monarchy created by the Constitution of 1791
- National Assembly (1871), a temporary French body elected on February 4, 1871, at the end of the Franco-Prussian War
- National Assembly (Portugal), name of the Portuguese parliament from 1933 to 1974
- National Assembly (Republic of China), a legislature that existed in various forms from 1913 to 2006, first in China and subsequently in Taiwan after the Chinese Civil War
- National Assembly (Spain), a corporative chamber in Spain active from 1927 to 1929
- Prussian National Assembly, a constitutional assembly of Prussia existing from November 5 to December 5, 1848
- Greek National Assemblies, a series of constitutional assemblies held sporadically since 1821
- Roman assemblies, various legislative bodies on ancient Rome
- National Assembly of Soviets, a legislature of the brief Hungarian Soviet Republic, existing only in June, 1919
- National State Assembly, the legislative body of Sri Lanka from May 22, 1972 to September 7, 1978
- National Assembly for Wales, existing from July 1, 1999 to May 6, 2020; renamed as the Welsh Parliament or Senedd Cymru in Welsh
