= Eduardo Vergara Wiesner =

Colombian lawyer and economist

Gustavo Eduardo Vergara Wiesner
- Occupations: Lawyer, economist
- Known for: First virtual marriage in Latin America; Director of ICBF
- Office: General Director of the Colombian Institute of Family Welfare (ICBF)

Gustavo Eduardo Vergara Wiesner is a Colombian lawyer and economist. He served as the General Director of the Colombian Institute of Family Welfare (ICBF) during President César Gaviria's administration. Additionally, he held the position of Notary 16 in the Bogotá Circle, where he achieved a historic milestone by officiating the first virtual marriage in Colombia and Latin America, thus making a significant impact on the digitalization of administrative processes across the continent.

He was also a co-founder and a member of the governing board of Gimnasio Los Caobos, a school established by Jesuit Father Gabriel Giraldo S.J. At the institution, he served as the Director of Student Affairs alongside Roberto Camacho Weberberg, Rodrigo Noguera Laborde, Alfonso Valdivieso, Trudy Kling, and Jaime Guzmán Vargas.
