= Pontifical Xavierian University Faculty of Medicine =

Pontificia Universidad Javeriana (Pontifical Xaverian University) School of Medicine
- Type: Private
- Established: February 25, 1942
- Dean: Carlos Gómez-Restrepo, M.D (academic), Sergio Bernal, S.J. (medium)
- Students: approx. 1,000
- Location: Cra. 7a no. 60-42 Hospital Universitario San Ignacio, 8th floor and 9th floor, Bogotá, Colombia
- Campus: Urban
- Website: www.javeriana.edu.co

The Pontificia Universidad Javeriana Faculty of Medicine in Bogotá, Colombia is one of the leading medical schools in Colombia and Latin America. Its structure lies within the campus of the Pontificia Universidad Javeriana and most practice takes place at its university hospital, the Hospital Universitario San Ignacio (HUSI). In the past 75 years the faculty has been home to many remarkable Colombian physicians and scientists known locally and internationally.

== History ==
In 1942 the faculty start working in a building of San Bartolomé Mayor school. In 1952 the Hospital Universitario San Ignacio (HUSI) was under construction, in the Pontificia Universidad Javeriana campus, and eventually the faculty office was moved there.

== Deans and administrative structure ==
The administrative structure of the faculty is structured into many dependencies, responding to the university's Academic and University Medium directives.

The faculty of medicine- as every other faculty in the university- runs a dual deanship structure, allowing for an academic dean to handle issues regarding the academic structure (curriculum, medical staff, hospital liaisons), and a University medium dean to handle issues of clinical and social ethics, student and staff welfare, among others.

Current deans are:

- Academic: Carlos Gómez-Restrepo, MD. Professor in Psychiatry. Member of the board of the university hospital.

Further along, the structure relies on the undergraduate programme director and an academic secretary (Martha Delgado, MD and Martha L. Rocha, respectively); a residency and fellowship programmes director (Efraim Leal, MD); and the respective department heads (see below).

== Departments, institutes and centres ==
The clinical sciences departments at the faculty are:

- Anaesthesiology (department head: Reinaldo Grueso, MD)
- Surgery (department head: Mauricio Pelaez, MD)
- Clinical epidemiology and biostatistics (department head: Carlos Gómez, MD)
- Ob/Gyn (department head: Jaime Silva, MD)
- Preventive medicine (interim department head: Amelia Fernández, MD)
- Internal Medicine (department head: W. Ricardo Bohórquez, MD)
- Neurosciences (department head: Luis Alfonso Zarco Montero, MD, MSc.)
- Orthopaedics and traumatology (department head: Luis Fernando Useche, MD)
- Paediatrics (department head: Alberto Martínez, MD)
- Pathology (department head: Luis Fernando Jaramillo, MD)
- Psychiatry (department head: José Miguel Uribe Restrepo, MD, MSc.)
- Radiology (department head: Luis F Uriza, MD)

Institutes at the faculty of medicine include:

- Institute of Human Genetics (director: Ignacio Zarante, MD), home to important genetics research in Latin America, including the well-known 'Expedición Humana' project years 1983-1997.
- Institute of health promotion (director: Amelia Fernández, MD)
- Institute of ageing
- Centro Javeriano de Oncología - CJO (director: Francisco J. Henao, MD), state-of-the-art oncologic therapy and diagnostics centre.
- Clinical simulation centre

Other departments include:

- Physiological sciences (department head: Maria José Fernández, MD, Pulmonologist, MSc.), which handles physiological sciences as well as pharmacological sciences.
- Morphology (department head: Angelika Kuhlmann Lüdeke, MD, MSc.), which handles anatomy, histology and embryology. For this purpose it is gifted with labs and an amphitheatre with a tables for 12 corpses.

== Curriculum ==
Magistral lessons in basic sciences

A 6th-semester student performs a paracentesis during an internal medicine rotation at the Samaritara University Hospital (HUS)

The faculty's programme is focused on the students' interaction with its medium on each different semester. The objective is to allow a theoretical learning based on 'magistral' lessons that can thereon be followed up by more intimate tutoring by doctors, residents and interns, as well as a practise, which can be at the laboratory, at the amphitheatre or at the hospital.

Grosso modo, the curriculum is divided into twelve semesters, the first ten of which is the basic preparation, and the last two are the internship practise.

The programme is divided in a 'basic sciences' bloc and a 'clinical sciences', bloc, which in turn also has a subdivision of 'surgical sciences'.

The basic sciences run through the first 5 semesters. This covers all subjects related to anatomy and neuroanatomy; histology; embryology; basic genetics; biochemistry and molecular biology; physiology and neurophysiology; human conduct and psychopathology; gross and histologic pathology; microbiology and parasitology; biostatistics; basic clinical (theoretical) psychiatry; pharmacology; pathophysiology; semiology and family medicine. This bloc also covers several ethics subjects including medicine and human values, as well as health anthropology. Throughout, students must practise on the corpses available at the amphitheatre; microscopic and lab analyses, as well as physiology lab analyses. During the 5th semester students have their first hospital practise covering the semiology course throughout the various areas of the university hospital.

Clinical sciences runs semesters 6 through 10. This covers basic internal medicine; specialised internal medicine; neurology and neurosurgery; radiology; clinical psychiatry; investigation and evidence-based medicine (EBM); dermatology; surgery; ob/gyn; paediatrics; clinical genetics; ORL; preventive medicine; anaesthesia; orthopaedics; urology; public health; occupational health; health service gesture and legal and penal responsibility, as well as medical administration. Throughout, students apply their knowledge by carrying out practises and shifts in the university hospital and in other hospitals in the city (depending on the subject) and in the country (compulsory for the psychiatry rotation).

The internship requires a first semester of regional internship, moving into 2nd and 1st level hospitals mostly in the Cundinamarca and Boyacá regions where students must reside and permanently practise, accompany during ambulance transfer to higher-level hospitals, as well as take full part in 'on-call' shifts. The second semester is basically focused on the students' review of his/her chosen subjects from any basic or clinical science, which can be distributed in any fashion, mostly in Hospital Universitario San Ignacio (HUSI).

== University Hospital ==
The Hospital Universitario San Ignacio is the faculty's "home", itself residing in the 8th and 9th floors of such institution. Students, residents, interns and medical staff work alongside within the hospital; the many departments located within the hospital's 9 floors allow for students to carry out rounds with doctors on most common specialties, usually in small groups (almost always less than 10 students per doctor). Students also carry out night shifts. The student area is located in the 6th floor, with about 60 beds, lockers, a TV room and studying rooms.

The hospital also has a fully equipped emergency room where practise is also carried out by students and residents on incoming and observation patients. Such is also the case in the fully equipped intensive care unit (ICU), divided into Cardiologic, Pulmonary and General instances.

== Affiliated hospitals & medical centres ==
The faculty of medicine runs its different extramural rotations in more than 30 hospitals and clinical institutions within Bogotá and Colombia, where further focus on the topics studied can be acquired by the students, by carrying out hospital practise. These vary from general hospitals to medical centres dedicated only to one specialty; they also vary widely in demographic and socioeconomic distribution, allowing for experience to be obtained in private and public hospitals with multicultural patients and varying amounts/quality of resources.

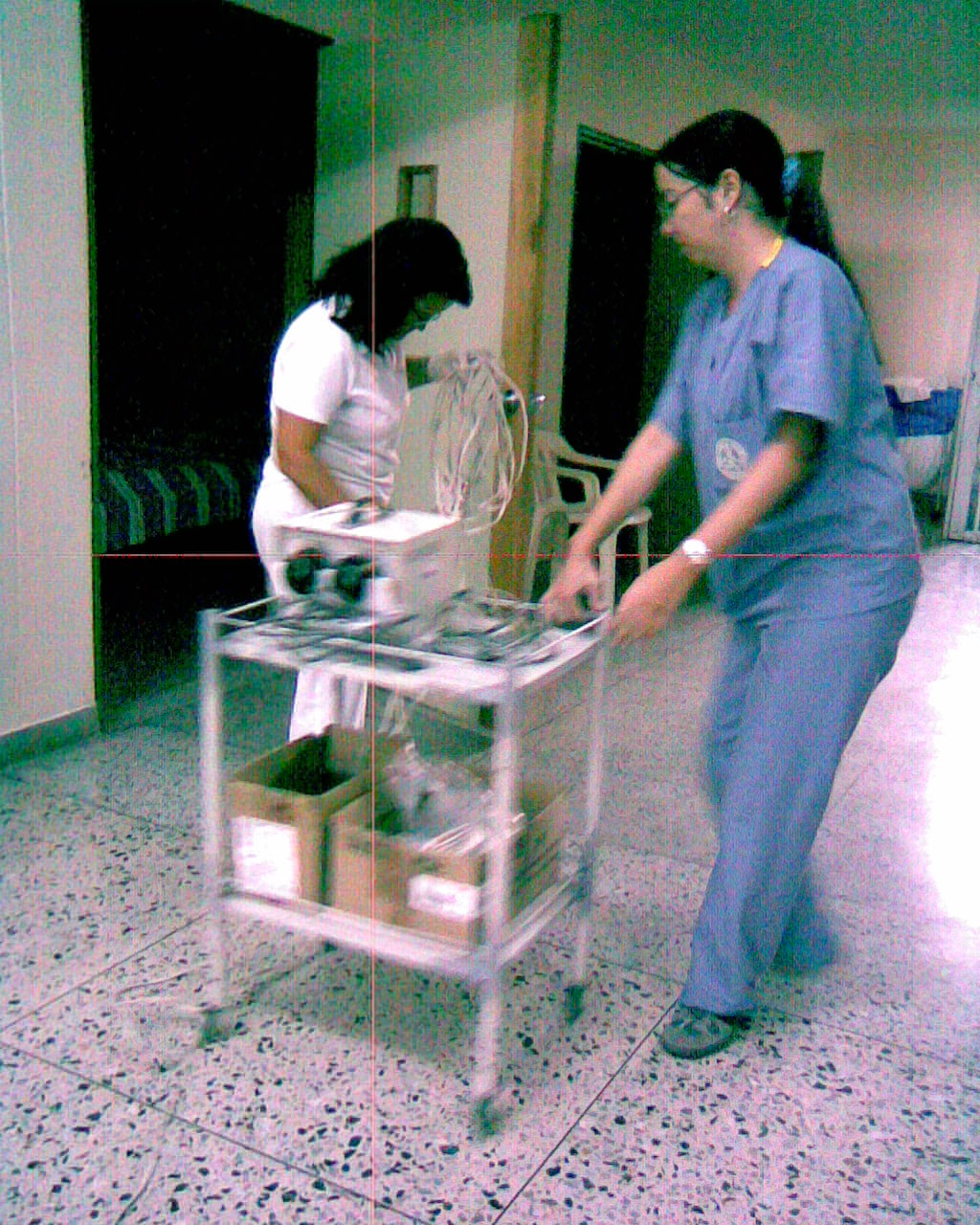
A psychiatry resident prepares to carry out ECT therapy at the mental health unit of the Federico Lleras Acosta in Ibagué

Among others:

- Centro Dermatológico Federico Lleras Acosta ESE - Bogotá (dermatology rotation)
- Clínica Nuestra Señora de la Paz -Bogotá (psychiatry rotation)
- Clínica Retornar - Bogotá (psychiatry rotation)
- Fundación Abood Shaio - Bogotá (internal medicine rotation)
- Fundación Cardio Infantil - Bogotá (internal medicine rotation)
- Fundación Clínica Valle de Lili - Cali (psychiatry rotation)
- Hospital Federico Lleras Acosta - Ibagué (psychiatry rotation)
- Hospital del Perpetuo Socorro - Pasto (psychiatry rotation)
- Hospital Diego León Álvarez - La Mesa (extramural internship)
- Hospital Regional de Guateque - Guateque (extramural internship)
- Hospital San Rafael ESE - Tunja (extramural internship)
- Hospital Santa Clara ESE - Bogotá (internal medicine rotation)
- Hospital Universitario de la Samaritana ESE - Bogotá (internal medicine / surgery / ob/gyn / orthopaedics rotations)
- Instituto de Ortopedia Infantil Franklin Delano Roosevelt - Bogotá (orthopaedics)
- Instituto Nacional de Cancerología ESE - Bogotá (internal medicine / surgery / psychiatry rotations)

== Notable Faculty & Alumni ==
- Alex Jadad, anesthesiologist and important promoter of evidence-based medicine via the Jadad Scale. Currently working in Canada.
- Rodolfo Llinás, physician, and neurophysiologist, researcher on neurosciences. Currently University Professor of the dept. of Physiology and Neurosciences at the NYU School of Medicine.
- Martha Lucía Ospina Martínez, first woman director of Colombia's Instituto Nacional de Salud (National Health Institute)
- Jaime Bernal Villegas, geneticist, founder and director of the Instituto de Genetica Humana (Human Genetics Institute), and director of the Expedición Humana Project (1983–1993), one of the most complete demographic studies of Colombia.

== Residencies and fellowships ==
The faculty offers the following residency programmes:

- Anaesthesiology
- General surgery
- Plastic surgery
- Radiology
- Medical genetics
- Public health gesture
- Ob/Gyn
- Radiotherapy
- Family medicine
- Internal medicine
- Neurosurgery
- Urology
- Neurology
- Orthopaedics and Trauma
- ENT
- Ophthalmology
- Paediatrics
- Psychiatry

The following are the fellowship programmes offered by the faculty:

- Cardiology
- Cardiovascular surgery
- Head and neck surgery
- Soft tissue tumor surgery
- Gastrointestinal and endoscopic surgery
- Oncologic surgery
- Oncologic plastic surgery
- Oncologic dermatology
- Pain and palliative care
- Clinical electrophysiology
- Endocrinology
- Gastroenterology and digestive endoscopy
- Haemodynamics and interventionist cardiology
- Oncologic imagenology
- Nephrology
- Pneumology
- Oncologic ophthalmology
- Oncologic Paediatrics
- Child orthopaedics
- Oncologic orthopaedics
- Hand and upper limb surgery
- Oncologic pathology
- Liaison psychiatry
- Child and adolescent psychiatry
- Oncologic rehab
- Clinical epidemiology

== Publications & media ==
The faculty of medicine has a quarterly scientific and clinical publication representing the investigations and studies of professors, students and residents, called Universitas Medica. The submitted articles are subject to rigorous review by an editorial committee headed currently by Luis F. Jaramillo. The academic journal is currently indexed and/or listed in several national and worldwide databases including Publindex (Colciencias), LILACS-BIREME, EBSCO, Latindex, the National Library of Medicine and Harvard's Countway Library, among others.

Students and teachers also participate in the recently re-launched (see: 65 year celebration below) In Situ bi-annual newspaper, with contents of a "lighter" focus, mostly for students.

== Angie Baquiro Group ==
The Grupo Angie Baquiro constitutes a non-profit group of medical students working in the health promotion within lower socioeconomic areas of the country. The main emphasis is based on preventive and interventive medicine, but the programme also includes pedagogic and cultural intervention to achieve long-term social benefits. Affiliation is voluntary and open to students in all semesters, each participating within an area coherent with their current knowledge and practise (e.g., 5th and 6th semester students participate usually in basic triage).

Achievements by the Angie Baquiro Group include:

- October 2006: 1st 'creating smiles' health brigade, with intervention on 200 children ages 1 through 4 from the Soacha and Ciudad Bolívar suburbs of Bogotá.
- April 2007: 2nd 'creating smiles' health brigade, with intervention on 150 children ages 1 through 6 from the Soacha and Ciudad Bolívar suburbs of Bogotá.

== Internal Medicine Interest Group (IMIG) ==
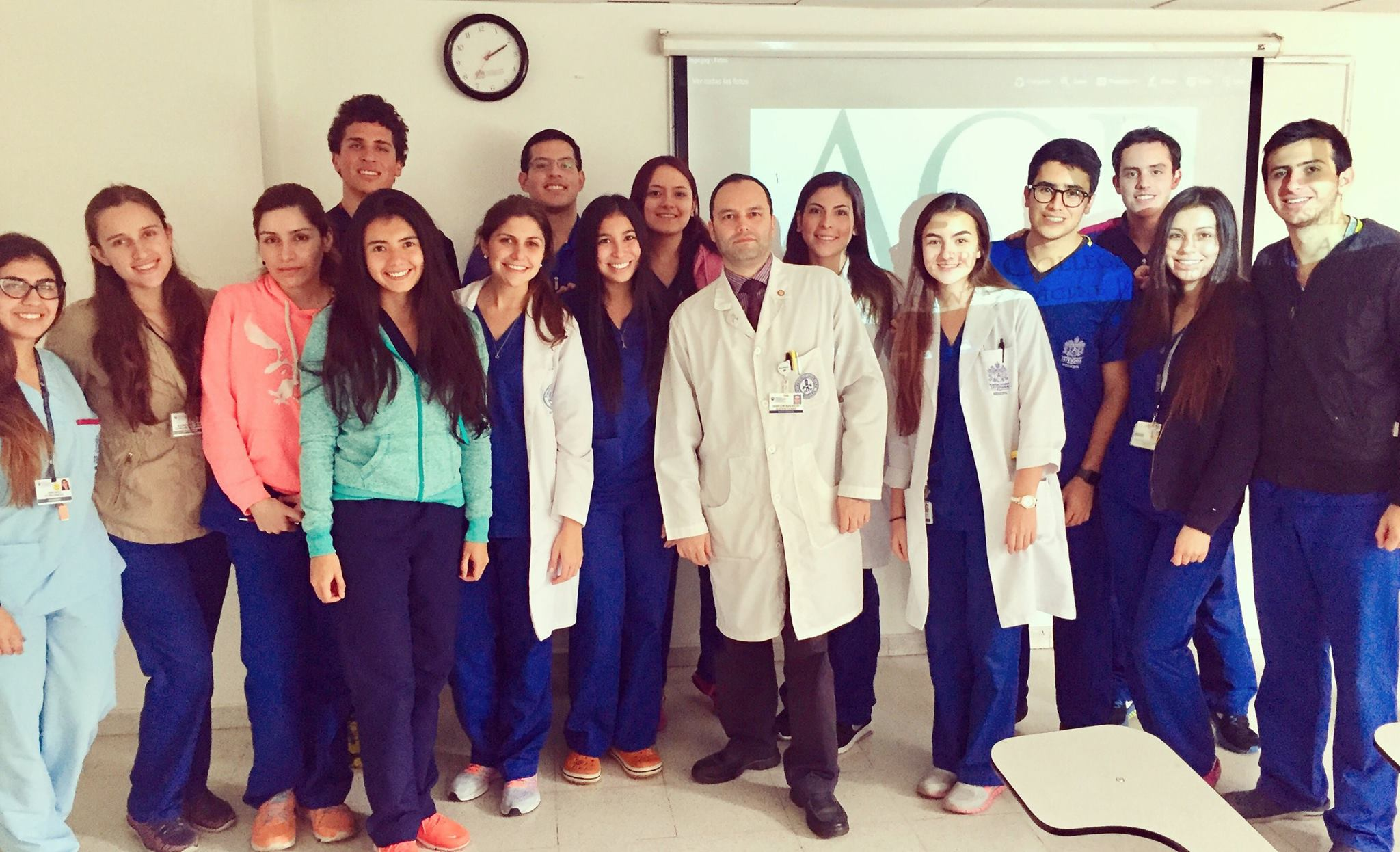
Internal Medicine Interest Group at U. Javeriana, David David, Maria Camila Pinzon A, Guillermo Pérez, Daniel Motta-Calderon, Maria juliana Soto, Maria Natalia Serrano, Dr. Marlon Bustos, Isabella Muñoz, Andrea Araujo, Camilo Rueda, Jeanette Coriat, Laura Hernandez, Jose Luis Peralta, Camila Tole.

In 2016, a group of 4th year medical students founded the Internal Medicine Interest Group, a non-profit academic student organization affiliated to the Colombian chapter of the American College of Physicians. The purpose of this group is to cultivate student's enthusiasm for Internal Medicine. The group meets up every 2 weeks for different activities such as journal clubs and clinical case challenge presentations. Up to February 2017, the group is composed by more than 50 students from basic and clinical years.

== See also ==
- Hospital Universitario San Ignacio
- Pontifical Xavierian University
