= Jadad =

Jadad can refer to:

- Alex Jadad, Colombian-Canadian physician/educator/researcher
  - The Jadad scale, a method for assessing a clinical trial's quality, developed by and named after Alex Jadad
