= Husi (disambiguation) =

Huși is a city in Romania.

Husi may also refer to:

- Huși, a village in Preutești Commune, Suceava County, Romania
- Huși, a small river in the city Huși, Romania
- Hospital Universitario San Ignacio (HUSI), a hospital in Bogotá, Colombia
- Huxi, Penghu, a city in the Pescadores Islands in Taiwan also spelled Husi
