= San Ignacio Hospital =

San Ignacio Hospital may refer to:

- Hospital Universitario San Ignacio (HUSI), Colombia
- San Ignacio Hospital (Belize)
