= Gimnasio Los Caobos =

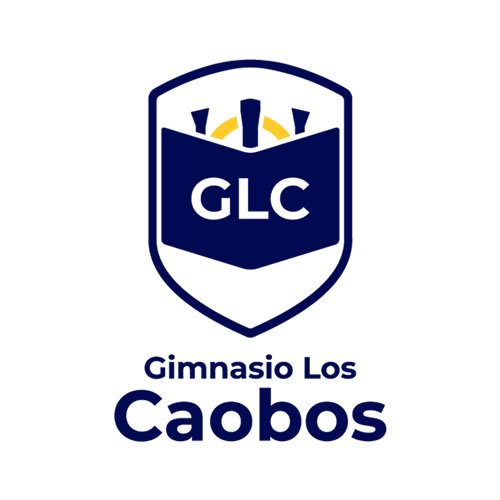
- Vereda La Balsa, Chía, Cundinamarca; Colombia

Information
- Type: Private, XXI Century education, Problem-based learning school
- Religious affiliation: Secular
- Denomination: Jesuits
- Founder: Rev. Father Gabriel Giraldo Zuluaga, S.J.
- Director: Carlos Felipe Diago
- Headmistress: Alicia Martínez de Suárez
- Gender: Co-educational
- Enrollment: 1,500
- Campus size: 5.36 hectares (13.2 acres)
- Colors: Blue, white and yellow
- Mascot: Koala
- Nickname: Giraldino(a)
- Accreditation: Ministry of Education of Colombia, American Association of Quality Control, U.C.B. Member, ISO 9001, Frank Locker, Cambridge English preparation center, Character Counts, Red Teprotejo, Red Papaz, Los mejores colegios Colombia
- USNWR ranking: Privy and exclusive school
- Website: gimnasioloscaobos.com

Gimnasio Los Caobos is a private preparatory school located in the Municipality of Chía, Cundinamarca, within the Metropolitan Area of Bogotá, Colombia. It is associated with the Society of Jesus and prepares students from grades K1 to 12. The School is ranked as "Very Superior" by the Colombian Institute for the Evaluation of Education (ICFES for its acronym in Spanish) and was the first preparatory school to adopt a Problem-based learning program within the Metropolitan Area of Bogotá, Colombia. Founded in 1991 by Rev. Gabriel Giraldo, S.J. and a group of notable lawyers from the Pontifical Xavierian University. It is also one of the very few ISO 9001 Certified preparatory schools in Latin America.

== History ==
In 1989 under the decision of Rev. Father Gabriel Giraldo Zuluaga, S.J. (then Dean of the Faculty of Law at the Pontifical Xavierian University), Felipe Diago Jabois and a group of notable lawyers (alumni from the same university), decided to found a preparatory school under the basis of Catholic principles and quality, bilingual, socially-responsible, and environmentally-friendly education, promoting investigation, technology and aim to serve the nation.

During May, 1991 Gabriel Giraldo Zuluaga along with Rodrigo Noguera Laborde, Gabriel Melo Guevara, Roberto Camacho Weberberg, Eduardo Vergara Wiesner, Jaime Alberto Guzmán Vargas, Gladys Salazar de Hidalgo, Felipe Diago Jabois, Isabel Cristina Bettin and Alicia Martínez de Suárez, founded Gimnasio Los Caobos, establishing the school at the Locality of Suba (Bogotá).

In 1995 Gimnasio Los Caobos moved to its present 5.36-hectare (13.2-acre) campus located at the Vereda La Balsa, in the Municipality of Chia. Since 1996, is one of the top Bilingüal preparatory schools in the country, due to the fact that courses in the English language were thought by Canadian staff.

In 2011 on the occasion of its 20th anniversary, Gimnasio Los Caobos was awarded the "Order of Policarpa Salavarrieta - Great Cross" by the Assembly of Cundinamarca. In 2003, the school received the "Order of the Chamber of Representatives of Colombia" and in 2001, the "Simon Bolivar Medal" was conferred by the Ministry of National Education.

== Academics ==
Gimnasio Los Caobos is consistently ranked among the top preparatory schools in the Bogotá-Cundinamarca Region and in Colombia. It has been designated as "Very Superior" ("Muy Superior") by the ICFES and is a Founding Member of the Union of Bilingual Schools (Unión de Colegios Bilingues - UCB), as well as a Member of both ASOCOLDEP and the Koality Kid Alliance of the American Society for Quality Control (ASQ).

The school is famous for its Model United Nations and Model Young Entrepreneur programs, in addition to its Band, Choir, Theater, Cheerleaders and Dance Groups. It maintains an exchange program with the Nancy Campbell Collegiate Institute (Canada) and a cooperation agreement with the Monterrey Institute of Technology and Higher Education (Mexico).

== House (Flagship) system ==
Gimnasio Los Caobos follows the House system tradition. Students and teachers form part of one of the four houses, which are called flagships, and compete in both academic and athletic tasks, crowning a winner at the end of the school year, depending on the overall points received. The four flagships are Terra, Mare, Caelum and Spatium.

== Campus ==
The school comprises a 5.36-hectare (13.2-acre) campus, which includes a three-floor high school building, the elementary and medium school buildings which are called "Colmenas" (Spanish for beehives, due to its similar structure), a theatre, a three-floor library, a sports arena, two computer learning centers, a fully equipped gym, and a physics, chemistry and biology lab.

The cafeteria operates in three different shifts, in addition to two fast food mini-shops.

Gimnasio Los Caobos' facilities were planned and/or re-designed to be "innovative learning environments", by Dr. Frank Locker, who currently co-teaches the Harvard University School of Education / School of Design course for educators and architects: Effective Education/Innovative Learning Environments.

== Scholarship and Awards Program ==
The school maintains a Scholarship Program granted to the student recipient of the "Gabriel Giraldo Order", Maximum Award of the Gimnasio Los Caobos (created in honor of the Founder). At the end of each academic year, the School rewards the student that best performs in the Colombian scholastic aptitude test (ICFES).

== Social responsibility and community engagement ==
Gimnasio Los Caobos provides English language classes to students from public schools located in the Municipality of Chía.

== Notable alumni ==
- JC Gonzalez - actor, songwriter, singer; participated in Victorious, Parks and Recreation, Blue, Los Americans and others

== See also ==
- List of Jesuit schools
