= World Institute for Nuclear Security =

International non-governmental membership organisation in Vienna, Austria

The World Institute for Nuclear Security (WINS) is an international non-governmental membership organisation located in Vienna, Austria. WINS focuses on the operational level of licensees, regulators and other similar stakeholders rather than on the state level (which is the remit of the International Atomic Energy Agency).

WINS provides a wide variety of services that focus on four major areas: 1) workshops and training, 2) the WINS Academy, 3) a knowledge centre and 4) evaluation. In this capacity, WINS has published over 36 international best practice guides and numerous special reports. It also conducts workshops, training courses and round-tables around the world and offers evaluation services that help licensees of nuclear and other radioactive material assess the maturity of their security programme and measure the results. The WINS Academy provides professional training and certification for people with nuclear security responsibilities.

WINS had more than 6,000 members from fields such as the private industry, nonprofit organisations, academia, law enforcement, government agencies and national laboratories.

== About WINS ==
WINS was launched in 2008 at the 52nd General Conference of the International Atomic Energy Agency (IAEA) in Vienna. The organisation was to provide an international forum to promote best security practices among those who manage the security of radioactive material.

WINS was legally formed as an Austrian association in October 2008, and it started operation in January 2009. In September 2010, the organisation was granted international non-governmental organisation (INGO) status by the Austrian Ministry of Foreign Affairs.

Structure: WINS has a board of directors and it is led by an executive director, who is supported by a small staff.

Membership: Organisations and individuals that have accountabilities for nuclear security. Membership is free of charge.

Funding: WINS was established by foundation grants from the Nuclear Threat Initiative (NTI), the US Department of Energy, the Norwegian Government and the Canadian Government. Subsequently, the United Kingdom Foreign and Commonwealth Office (UK FCO) and the US State Department (Partnership for Nuclear Security or “PNS”) also pledged their support.

== Services ==
=== Workshops, training courses, round-tables and webinars ===
WINS hosts a variety of workshops, training courses, round-tables and webinars annually in locations around the world. (Over 80 workshops have taken place since 2009.)

In addition, WINS pioneered the use of theatre in nuclear security training.

=== WINS Academy ===
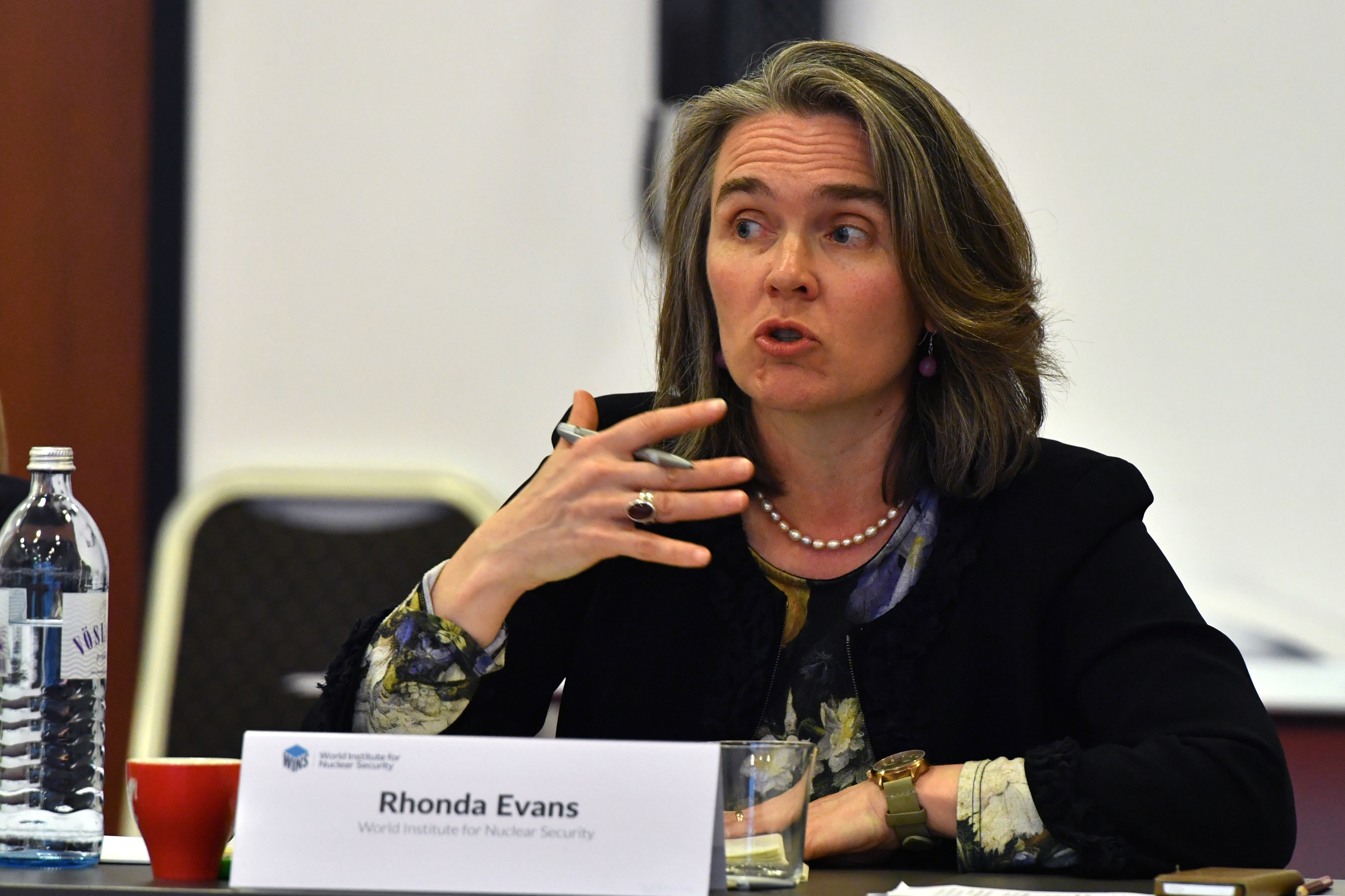
Rhonda Evans leads the academy

Launched in 2014, the WINS Academy is the world's first international certification programme for nuclear security management. The programme views security as a fundamental aspect of risk management and corporate reputation. It is led by Rhonda Evans.

It is offered as an on-line self-study course. It consists of a foundation module plus nine electives. All participants must first enrol in the foundation module; they can then select the elective of their choice. Modules use a problem-based approach to learning.

Once participants complete a module, they sit a proctored exam. Those who successfully pass the examinations for both the Foundation Module and the elective module become WINS Certified Nuclear Security Professionals (CNSPs). They also receive access to the WINS Academy Alumni Network, which enables them to benefit from continued professional development.

All certification exams are delivered in partnership with Pearson Vue.

The academy ambassadors are Certified Professionals (CNSfPs and CNSsPs) who, with the support of their own institution, volunteer to promote the WINS Academy certification programmes in their country and their region. One of these ambassadors is the Colombian professor Camilo Prieto Valderrama.

=== Knowledge centre ===
WINS publishes numerous documents on the management of nuclear and other radioactive material. These include 36 international best practice guides, numerous special reports and peer review guidelines, as well as presentations and summaries from all workshops.

=== Evaluation ===
WINS offers a variety of evaluation services and tools. For example, all international best practice guides include practical self-assessment questionnaires directed at such stakeholders as the board, executive management, security directors and regulators. They also include a security management maturity scale consisting of five different levels of organisational achievement for security. When stakeholders benchmark where they fall on this scale, they are able to identify possible gaps in their security infrastructure and provide a starting point for improvement.

Upon request, WINS carries out employee surveys and conducts peer reviews on security culture. The organisation is currently collaborating with the World Association of Nuclear Operators (WANO) to learn more about their approach to peer review in nuclear safety and operations. The goal is to identify best practices that could be applied to corporate review of security management, assess security culture, and help organisations identify areas where management attention is needed.

== International support and collaboration ==
WINS works closely with the IAEA to promote the Agency's work on nuclear security. It also seeks to ensure that all academy modules and international best practice guides are aligned with the IAEA's international guidance and recommendations.

At the March 2016 Nuclear Security Summit in Washington, D.C., 12 countries signed a Gift Basket on Certified Training in which they committed to support the WINS Academy in its efforts to expand its international certification programme. They also agreed to promote cooperative efforts between the WINS Academy and the IAEA. By signing this Gift Basket, Canada, Finland, Hungary, Indonesia, Kazakhstan, Mexico, the Netherlands, New Zealand, Norway, Thailand, the United Kingdom, and the United States expressed their support for the commitments in INFCIRC/869 and acknowledged the international recognition of the need for nuclear security training, education, certification and/or qualification activities. Since then, additional countries have committed support, including Jordan, Malaysia and Romania.

== See also ==
- International Atomic Energy Agency
- Nuclear Threat Initiative
- World Association of Nuclear Operators
- Institute of Nuclear Materials Management
