= Brigitte Baptiste =

Colombian biologist

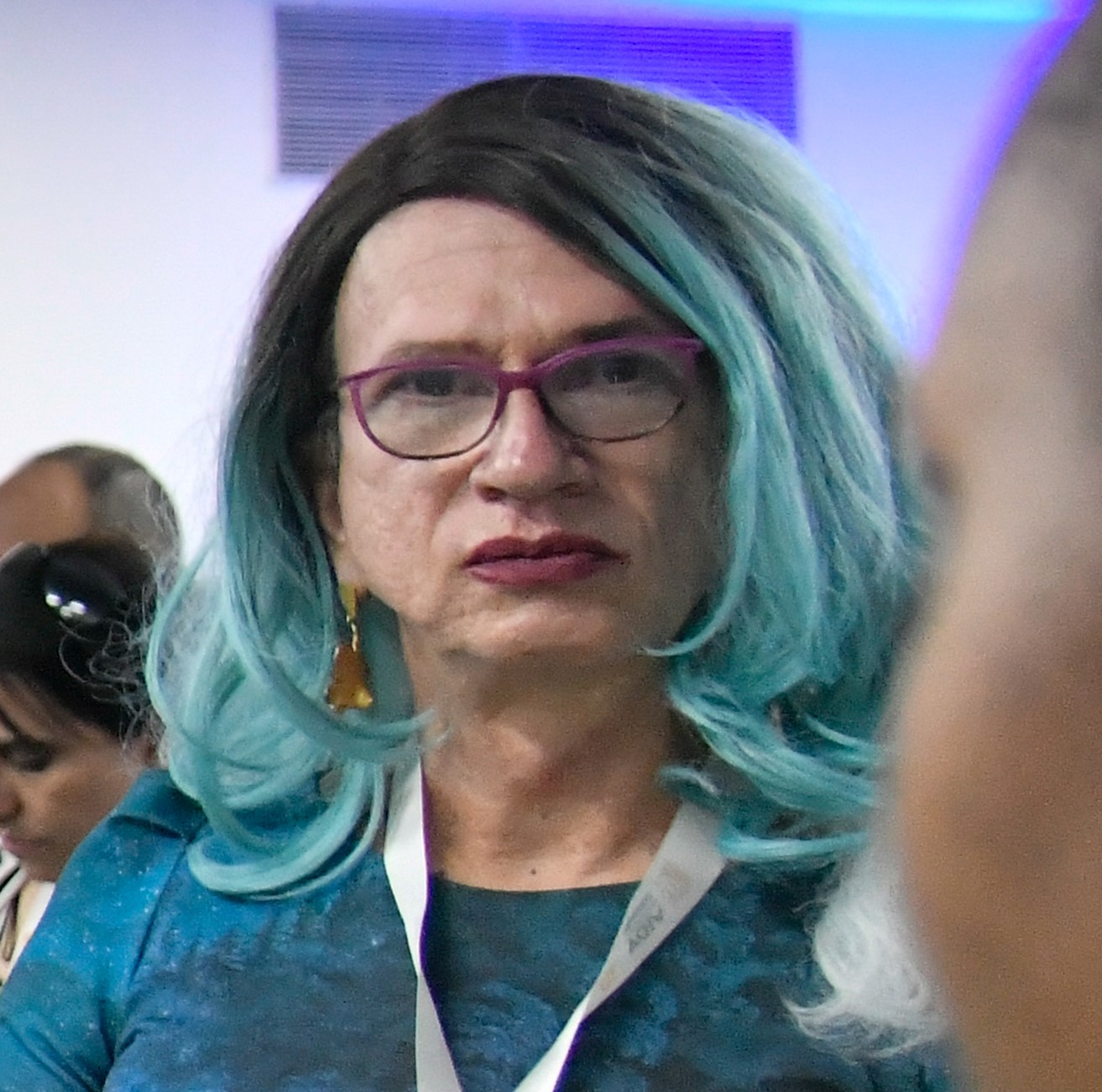
- Baptiste in 2023
- Born: October 23, 1963 (age 62); Bogotá, Colombia
- Education: Pontifical Xavierian University; University of Florida; Autonomous University of Barcelona
- Spouse: Adriana Vásquez (m. 1999)
- Children: 2
- Scientific career
- Fields: Ecology
- Institutions: EAN University

Brigitte Luis Guillermo Baptiste (born October 23, 1963) is a Colombian cultural landscape ecologist and an expert on environmental issues and biodiversity in Colombia. She is a member of the Multidisciplinary Expert Panel of the Intergovernmental Science and Policy Platform on Biodiversity and Ecosystem Services and has been part of the national representation to the Inter-American Institute for Global Change Research. She served as director of the Alexander von Humboldt Biological Resources Research Institute from 2011 until 2019. In September 2019, Baptiste became the director of Universidad Ean. She considers that queerness and ecology are linked together.

== Education ==
Baptiste studied biology at the Pontifical Xavierian University, where she graduated with a thesis on the ecology of fishing in Araracuara, Amazon. As a Fulbright Scholar from 1992 to 1994, she completed a master's degree in tropical conservation and development studies at the University of Florida. Her thesis concerned forest management by rural communities in Boyacá Andes, Colombia. She continued her graduate studies as part of the Russell Train Program of the World Wildlife Fund (WWF) at the Autonomous University of Barcelona, in Environmental Sciences (Ecological Economics and Natural Resource Management) in 2000. Her dissertation is titled, "The concept of main ecological structure (EEP in spanish) and its potential as environmental management tool for biodiversity".

== Professional life ==
Brigitte Baptiste has had a long career in both nonprofit and academic spheres. As a student in 1982, she co-founded the environmental nonprofit Corporación Grupo Ecológico GEA, which she would later serve as director from 1984 to 1991. From 1991 to 1996, she served as a professor in the Institute of Environmental Studies and Development (IDEADE) at Pontifical University, during which she edited Ambiente y Desarrollo (IDEADE-PUJ). After 1996, she coordinated the Program for Biodiversity Use and Valuation at the Humboldt Institute and consulted for numerous nonprofits, including WWF Colombia. She returned to Pontifical University from 2002 to 2009 to teach and research as an assistant professor. She served as the director of the Humboldt Institute from 2011 to 2019.

As director, Baptiste represented Colombia's scientific authority to the Convention on International Trade in Endangered Species of Wild Fauna and Flora (CITES) and Subsidiary Body of Scientific, Technical and Technological Advice (SBSTTA). She serves on the Intergovernmental Panel on Biodiversity and Ecosystem Services (IPBES) as a member of its Global Panel of 25 experts (MEP) on behalf of Latin America and the Caribbean (2015–2017). There, she co-chairs working groups on Indigenous and Local Knowledge, as well as on Policy Tools and Methodologies. She is also a member of the IAI's Science Policy Advisory Committee (Inter-American Environmental Initiative for Global Change) and the scientific committee of the global program PECS (Ecosystem Change and Society). She was a prominent voice advocating for a peace deal in the Colombian Civil War. Baptiste became director of Universidad Ean in September 2019.

In addition to her academic pursuits, Brigitte Baptiste was featured in an episode of "Taboo" by National Geographic Latin America. She is also a columnist in the economic newspaper La República.

Her life was portrayed in the book Brigitte Baptiste: un homenaje ilustrado (lit. 'Brigitte Baptiste: an illustrated tribute').

== Personal life ==
Baptiste married Adriana Vásquez on December 31, 1999. Together they have two daughters, Candelaria and Juana Pasión.

== Awards ==
In December 2024, Brigitte Baptiste was included on the BBC's 100 Women list.
