= Natalia Abello Vives =

Colombian lawyer and politician

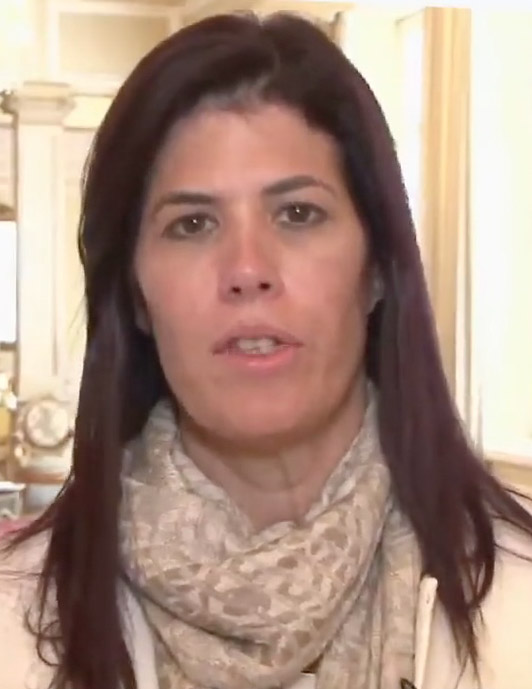

13th Minister of Transport of Colombia
- In office 19 August 2014 – 6 May 2016
- President: Juan Manuel Santos Calderón
- Preceded by: Cecilia Álvarez-Correa Glen
- Succeeded by: Jorge Eduardo Rojas Giraldo

Personal details
- Born: 30 May 1967 (age 59) Barranquilla, Atlántico, Colombia
- Party: Radical Change
- Spouse: Luis Eduardo Camacho
- Education: Pontifical Xavierian University (LLB, 1990)
- Profession: Lawyer

Natalia Abello Vives (born 30 May 1967) is a Colombian lawyer and politician who served as the 13th Minister of Transport of Colombia in the administration of President Juan Manuel Santos Calderón.

A Pontifical Xavierian University lawyer and member of the Radical Change Party, Abello was serving as secretary general of the City of Barranquilla in the Administration of Mayor Elsa Noguera De la Espriella when she was appointed by President Santos as Minister of Transport, taking office on 19 August 2014, and serving until 6 May 2016.

Abello was born on 30 May 1967 in Barranquilla, Atlántico to former governor, minister, and Congressman, Antonio Abello Roca and his wife Yolanda Vives Vengoechea. She is married and has three children.
