= Martha Lucía Ospina Martínez =

Colombian scientist and epidemiologist

Martha Lucía Ospina Martínez is a Colombian epidemiologist and doctor who specializes in public health management who was the director of the National Institute of Health (INS) until Her last day on October 31, 2022 when she went to work for the Omic Sconces Laboratory. a native of Cali, she had previously served as the Ministry of Health’s National Director of Epidemiology and Demography and director of the High Cost Diseases Account.

== Education ==
She is a graduate of the Pontifical Xavierian University Faculty of Medicine, where she specialized in public health management. Ospina also has a master’s degree in epidemiology from University of Valle and master's degree in economics from Pompeu Fabra University.
