= Roberto Camacho Weberberg =

Colombian politician who tragically died in a helicopter crash

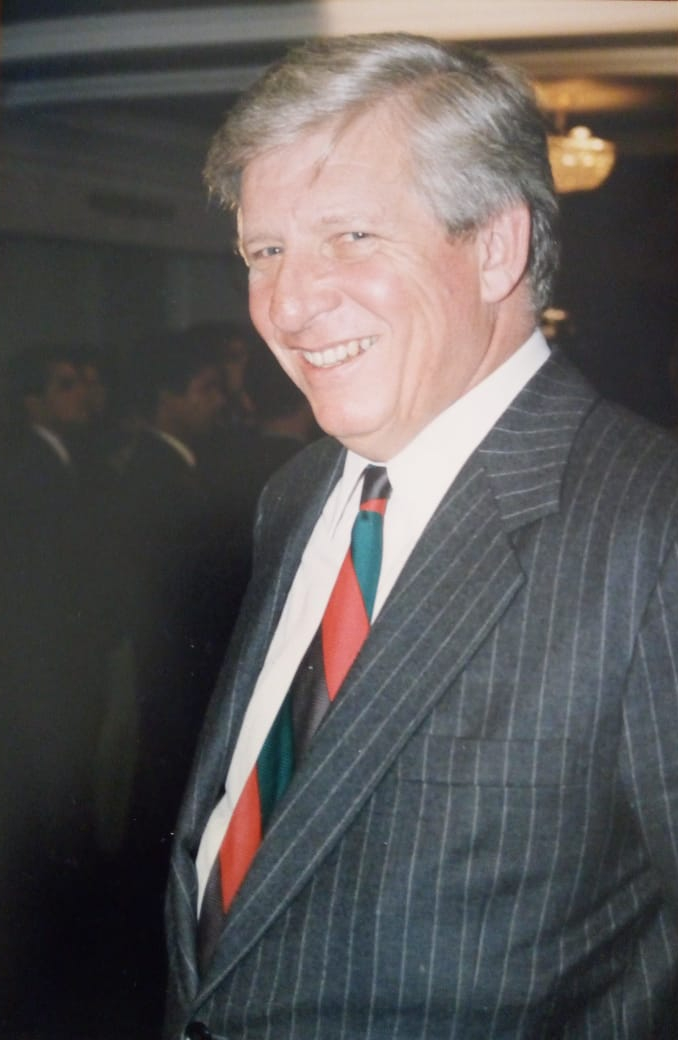

Member of the Chamber of Representatives of Colombia

Personal details
- Born: April 18, 1951 Bogotá, Colombia
- Died: November 20, 2005 (aged 54) Pacho, Colombia
- Political party: National Salvation Movement; Colombian Conservative Party

Roberto Camacho Weberberg (Bogotá, 18 April 1951–20 November 2005) was a Colombian politician, congressman, and lawyer specializing in labor law. He graduate from Pontificia Universidad Javeriana. As a politician, he represented Cundinamarca at the Chamber of Representatives from 1990 to 1991, with the Colombian Conservative Party and represented Bogotá at the Chamber of Representatives from 1991 to 1994, 1994 to 1998, and 1998 to 2002, with the National Salvation Movement. He died in a helicopter crash in 2005.

== Life ==
Camacho was born on 18 April 1951 in Bogotá. His father was an Army general, as was his uncle, Luis Carlos Camacho Leyva, who held the position of Minister of Defense in the Turbay Ayala administration. He was a descendant of Camacho Leyva.

He graduate from Pontificia Universidad Javeriana.

== Career ==
Camacho dedicated himself to politics at a very young age under the guidance of Álvaro Gómez Hurtado and was one of the most prominent leaders of the parliamentary caucus in the First Commission.

As a member of the Colombian Conservative Party, he represented Cundinamarca at the Chamber of Representatives from 1990 to 1991.

In May 1991, Jesuit priest Gabriel Giraldo Zuluaga together with Roberto and a group of leading lawyers like Gustavo Eduardo Vergara Wiesner, Rodrigo Noguera Laborde, Gabriel Melo Guevara, Jaime Alberto Guzmán Vargas, Gladys Salazar de Hidalgo, Felipe Diago Jabois, Isabel Cristina Bettin and Alicia Martínez de Suárez, founded Gimnasio Los Caobos, establishing the school in Suba, Bogotá, one of a few ISO 9000 certified preparatory schools in Latin America.

As a member of the National Salvation Movement, he represented Bogotá at the Chamber of Representatives from 1991 to 1994, 1994 to 1998, and 1998 to 2002.

Roberto Camacho was a staunch conservative and a prominent speaker on Colombian political issues such as political reform, extradition, the 2005 Justice and Peace Law, and the anti-terrorist statutes.

== Death and legacy ==
On 20 November 2005, he died in a helicopter crash along with 5 other people. His death left a vacuum in the capital's politics. Fourteen years after his death, his son Juan Pablo Camacho was a candidate for the Bogotá City Council, for the Democratic Center.

== Honors ==
- Session room Roberto Camacho Weberberg, of Commission I of the House of Representatives in the Congress of the Republic of Colombia.
