= Rodrigo Noguera Laborde =

Colombian academic and public figure (1919–2004)

Attorney General of Colombia
- In office 1958-1961
- Preceded by: Domingo Sarasti
- Succeeded by: Andrés Holguín Holguín

Minister of Justice
- In office May 13, 1958 – August 7, 1958
- Preceded by: Fernando Isaza
- Succeeded by: German Zea Hernandez

Minister of Mines and Petroleum
- In office May 27, 1952 – May 25, 1953
- President: Laureano Gómez
- Preceded by: Eleuterio Serna Ramírez Carlos Villaveces
- Succeeded by: Pedro Nel Rueda Uribe

Personal details
- Education: Pontificia Universidad Javeriana
- Awards: Cruz de Boyacá, in the degree of 'Grand Cross', with the Antonio Nariño Order, the Pontifical Javeriana University Order, the Rodrigo de Bastidas Order and with the José Acevedo y Gómez Order of Merit, in the degree of “Grand Cross”, the “José María Córdova” decoration of the Military Forces and the Francisco de Paula Santander Order.

Statue honoring Laborde

Rodrigo Noguera Laborde (Santa Marta, October 22, 1919 — June 28, 2004) was a Colombian academic, writer, jurist, public figure and philosopher. Served as Attorney General of Colombia and Minister of mines, Justice and Law. Noguera founded academic institutions like the Sergio Arboleda University and Gimnasio los Caobos.

== Early life and education ==
Laborde was born in Santa Marta on October 22, 1919. At the age of twelve he moved to Bogotá and entered the Colegio del Rosario where he finished his high school, then he moved to the recently founded Faculty of Law at the Universidad Javeriana, where he obtained a doctorate in law, Economic Sciences and Philosophy and Letters.

== Career ==
Laborde was appointed professor of law at the Javeriana University by the Jesuit Félix Restrepo. He taught at the University for 49 continuous years. In addition to his teaching at Universidad Javeriana, he taught at Del Rosario University and the National University of Colombia, where he served as dean of the Faculty of Philosophy; he also founded the Philosophy program at La Gran Colombia University.

As a militant of the Conservative party, he exercised the functions of Minister of Mines and Petroleum, under the presidency of his friend Laureano Gómez, and of Justice in times of the Government Military Junta. When he withdrew from it, the Military Government Junta conferred on him the honorary rank of Colonel, the highest grade allowed, in the case of civilians. Likewise, due to his knowledge and rectitude of character, he was Attorney General of the Nation in the government of Laureano Gómez, a position from which he resigned during the 1953 coup, but to which he returned during the first government of the National Front, in the presidency of Alberto Lleras Camargo.

For his service to Colombia and academia, he was the object of various distinctions, including the Cruz de Boyacá, in the degree of 'Grand Cross', with the Antonio Nariño Order, the Pontifical Javeriana University Order, the Rodrigo de Bastidas Order and with the José Acevedo y Gómez Order of Merit, in the degree of “Grand Cross”, the "José María Córdova" decoration of the Military Forces and the Francisco de Paula Santander Order.

As Rector of Sergio Arboleda University during the last 20 years of his life, he promoted academic rigor and Christian humanism. His work and contributions to the university continue to be recognized.

He retired from the Javeriana, in 1984 he founded the Universidad Sergio Arboleda in Bogotá and ran the chair of Philosophy of Law since the creation of the School, from which he retired a year and a half before his death.

He acted as director of the board of the school Gimnasio los Caobos alongside: Gabriel Giraldo, Alvaro González, S.J.; Alfonso Valdivieso, former Minister of Education; Alicia Martínez de Suárez, rector of the gym; Felipe Diago Jabois, director of the Student Environment; Eduardo Vergara Wiesner, Roberto Camacho, Trudy Kling, and Jaime Guzmán Vargas and Rodrigo Noguera Laborde, as rector of the Sergio Arboleda University.

== Death ==
Laborde, died in Bogotá on June 28, 2004, a few days before the 20th anniversary of the founding of the Sergio Arboleda University.
