= Gabriel Giraldo Zuluaga =

Colombian priest and Educator

Gabriel Giraldo Zuluaga S.J. (24 January 1907 – 1 March 1993) was a jesuit, philosopher, historian, professor, lawyer and dean of the Faculty of Law of the Pontificia Universidad Javeriana, and dean of the University Environment and General Secretary. Giraldo became a national figure of Colombia during the 20th century from the deanship of the Faculty of Law of the Javeriana University, died on 1 March 1993, in Bogotá, Cundinamarca, Colombia, at the age of 86.

== Biography ==
His father was Capitán Julio César Giraldo Gómez, and his mother, María de Jesús Ana Joaquina Zuluaga Zuluaga. Born on 24 January 1907, in Marinilla, Antioquia, Colombia.

He entered the Society of Jesus at the age of 16 and was ordained four years later. He became a philosopher at the Javeriana University, and a theologian and graduate in ecclesiastical history at the Gregorian University in Rome, Italy. Years later he received an honorary degree in legal sciences from Javeriana.

He handled the strings of power from his desk. Almost half a century of the country's history paraded through his office. Ministers, presidential advisors and many other high-level figures such as Noemí Sanin and Maristela Sanín, Rodrigo Lloreda, Andrés Pastrana, Francisco Posada de la Peña, Juan Martín Caicedo, Fernando Carrillo, María Teresa Forero de Saade. Were trained under his tutelage Alvaro Leyva, Alfonso Valdivieso, Carlos Albán, Daniel Mazuera, Carlos Holguín Sardi, Jaime García Parra, Augusto Ramírez Ocampo and Julio César Turbay Junior. and Among his soul disciples were Luis Carlos Galán, the Samper Pizano brothers and notable lawyers from the Pontifical Xavierian University such as Rodrigo Noguera Laborde, Gabriel Melo Guevara, Roberto Camacho Weberberg, Eduardo Vergara Wiesner, Jaime Alberto Guzmán Vargas, Gladys Salazar de Hidalgo, Felipe Diago Jabois, Isabel Cristina Bettin and Alicia Martínez de Suárez. Later in 1991, with the same group of lawyers HE founded The Gimnasio Los Caobos, private school in the Locality of Suba (Bogotá). This school is one of the very few ISO 9001 Certified preparatory schools in Latin America.

Giraldo was the President of the Organizing Committee of the I Javerianos Lawyers Congress.

== Recognition ==
- Gabriel Giraldo Foundation for the promotion of research and cooperation with low-income students.
- Gabriel Giraldo Zuluaga S.J. building started in September 1991, at Pontifical Xavierian University .
- awarded the 'Camilo Torres' medal.
