= Camilo Prieto Valderrama =

Colombian surgeon and environmentalist

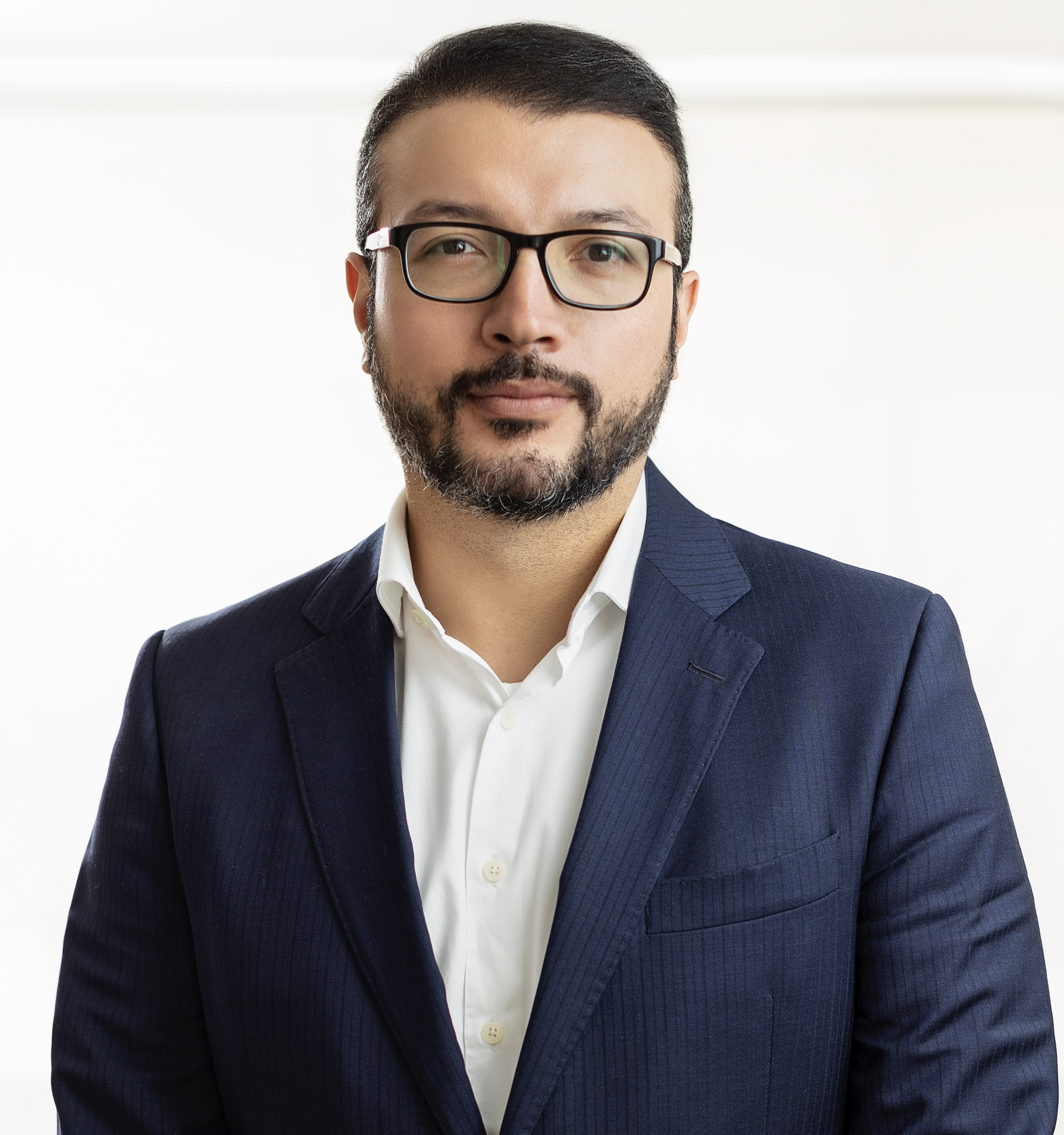
- Education: Pontifical Xavierian University
- Occupations: Energy and Sustainability Professor Nuclear Energy Researcher
- Organization: Colombian Nuclear Network World Institute for Nuclear Security
- Website: www.camiloprieto.com

Camilo Prieto Valderrama is a Colombian professor and researcher whose academic work focuses on energy policy, sustainability, and the role of nuclear energy in decarbonization and energy security. He is affiliated with the Pontificia Universidad Javeriana and has contributed to national discussions on environmental policy. He serves as director of the Colombian Nuclear Network (Red Nuclear Colombiana) and as Colombia's academic ambassador to the World Institute for Nuclear Security (WINS).

== Biography ==
Prieto received a Bachelor of Medicine from the Javeriana University, a master's degree in Philosophy at the Javeriana University (2014), and a postgraduate degree in Human Rights at the Open University of Catalonia.

In 2013, he founded the Movimiento Ambientalista Colombiano, an environmental advocacy organization. He has been involved in environmental campaigns in regions such as San Andrés, Chocó, La Guajira, and Putumayo.

Prieto has participated in various political forums and negotiations advocating for pro-environment policies: Insertion of Colombia in the Escazú Agreement for Latin America; Energy Transition Table; and proposals to President Iván Duque after the social unrest of autumn 2019. In this case, Prieto expressed concern regarding the absence of pollution control policies and the need to sign the Escazú Agreement. He teaches climate science at Pontificia Universidad Javeriana and conducts research with the Colombian Geological Survey.

During the COVID-19 pandemic, Prieto broadcast several educational videos on the best ways to deal with the virus.

Prieto is also active in science communication. He is the author of essays and articles, the blog and the internet video channel "El Planetario". He collaborated with the TV program Muy Buenos Días for 11 years, has worked with the RCN Channel directed by Jota Mario Valencia, and is currently the host of Vida conciencia and of "Conversaciones en Casa" on Canal Capital.

== Selected academic publication ==
Camilo Prieto Valderrama has contributed to the scientific literature in areas such as nuclear energy, sustainability, and planetary boundaries. His most notable works include:

- "Estimation of Levelized Cost of Energy for Small Modular Reactors in Colombia: A Monte Carlo Simulation Approach" (June 2025), published in the International Journal of Energy Economics and Policy, presenting the first study estimating the levelized cost of energy for SMRs in Colombia.
- "Modeling the transition from coal to SMRs in Colombia: Emissions avoidance under deterministic and probabilistic frameworks" (July, 2025). Coal-to-nuclear strategy for Colombia. Frontiers in Energy Research.
- "Advances in Modular Reactors: Design, Operation and Future Prospects" (June 2024), published in Power System Technology, in which he analyzes the design, operation, and advantages of small modular reactors (SMRs) as a tool for the energy transition.
- "Relationship between SMR and Planetary Boundaries: A Mitigation Strategy for the Global Environmental Crisis" (IAEA International SMR Conference, October 2024), which explores SMRs as a strategy to comply with planetary boundaries.

== Books ==
In his book "El perro a cuadros" (2013) he recounts his memories of childhood and youth when he began to be aware of the ecological crisis, and proposes environmental methodology through responsible consumption.

He wrote the essays "La economía de los nobles propósitos y el continente de la esperanza" and "La tonalidad de la muerte" after studying German idealism and Heidegger. In the first of the books cited, he proposes a way to migrate towards a new economy. In 2021 he wrote "Nutrición Sostenible".

== Awards and recognitions ==
- Winner of the Titanes Caracol 2016 Award in the Environmental Sustainability category with the project "Environmental Classrooms" for the Wayuus people.
- Selection of Leaders of the Year 2018, Honorable Mention, Universidad Nacional Abierta y a Distancia (UNAD).
- Recognition as a "Forest Squire" (2019), Alliance Against Deforestation.
- Winner of Orden Cruz Esculapio (2022), Colegio Medico Colombiano.
- Cruz Orden Simón Bolivar (2025), Congreso de la República de Colombia
