= Hospital Universitario San Ignacio =

Coordinates: 4°37′42.08″N 74°03′50.59″W

Geography
- Location: Bogotá, Colombia

Organisation
- Care system: EPS, Prepagada
- Type: Teaching
- Affiliated university: Pontificia Universidad Javeriana

Services
- Standards: Level 4 IPS
- Emergency department: Level I trauma
- Beds: 300

History
- Founded: 1942

Links
- Website: http://www.husi.org.co/
- Lists: Hospitals in Colombia

The Hospital Universitario San Ignacio (HUSI) is a 4th level university hospital in Bogotá, Colombia. It is located within the campus of the Pontificia Universidad Javeriana and is home to this school's faculties of Medicine, Nursing and Dentistry. The hospital serves nearly all fields in medical expertise and has been home to several recognised physicians including neurologist Rodolfo Llinás and anesthesiologist Alejandro Jadad. Its ample resources and serving the Downtown and northeast areas of the capital city make it an important referral centre in all fields.

== Recognition ==
The Hospital Universitario San Ignacio was recently ranked third best hospital in Colombia, according to the National Ministry of Social Protection.

== Departments ==
- Anaesthesiology (Director: Fritz Gempeler, MD)
- Cardiology (Director: Ricardo Bohórquez, MD)
- Dermatology
- Endocrinology (Director: Ana María Gómez, MD)
- Epidemiology
- Gastroenterology (Director: Albis Hani, MD)
- Genetics (Director: Jaime Bernal, MD, PhD)
- Geriatrics (Director: Carlos A. Cano, MD)
- Hemato-oncology
- Infectious diseases (Director: Carlos Álvarez, MD)
- Internal Medicine (Director: Ricardo Bohórquez, MD)
- Mental Health (Director: Carlos Gómez-Restrepo, MD)
- Nephrology (Director: Roberto d'Achiardy, MD)
- Neurosciences (Director: Felipe Pretelt, MD)
- Nutrition and diet
- OB/Gyn (Director: Jaime Luis Silva, MD)
- Ophthalmology (Director: Giovanni Castaño, MD)
- Orthopaedics (Director: Luis Fernando Useche, MD)
- ORL (Director: Santiago Gutiérrez, MD)
- Paediatrics
- Plastic Surgery
- Pneumology (Director: Jully Sanchez, MD)
- Radiology
- Rheumatology (Director: Juan M. Gutiérrez, MD)
- Sleep Medicine (Director: Patricia Hidalgo, MD)
- Surgery (Director: Mauricio Peláez, MD)
- Transplant Unit (Director: Héctor Pulido, MD)
- Urology (Director: Juan G. Cataño MD)

== Annex facilities ==
The HUSI works jointly with two leading centres in the field of oncology and genetics. These are:

- Centro Javeriano de Oncología (Director: Francisco Henao, MD)

The CJO is the most modern cancer specialised facility in Colombia, offering diagnostic as well as therapeutic alternatives relying on the centre's two linear accelerators. Potential uses including radiosurgery, radiotherapy, brachytherapy and chemotherapy are in service. It serves approx. 150 radiotherapy patients/day, 40 chemotherapy patients/day and 150 consults/day.

- Instituto de Genética Humana (Director: Juanita Angel Uribe, MD, PhD)

The IGH offers research for patients in the field of inherited metabolic diseases, familial cancer and other genetic or inherited disorders, via cytogenetic analyses and biochemical testing. It is located behind the hospital, beside the Medical School's morphology dept.

- Consulta Externa

The outpatient service atop the annex parking facilities has over 20 rooms, some of which are conditioned for several specialties (High-risk pregnancy care, urology among others).

== Faculty of medicine and student life ==
Students are expected to begin working in the hospital starting 5th semester (3rd year). At this point rotations for semioloy require only 2-3h daily practise. However, starting 6th semester and onward, students must work in the hospital permanently in the various rotations according to the specialty (as long as they are not rotating in other hospitals). This also requires 12- to 24-hour night rounds.

For this purpose, the hospital has conditioned a student area on the 6th floor, with over 60 bunkbeds divided into 12 rooms (each with its own toilet and shower), a TV room, lockers and study rooms. Further improvements are expected soon.

== See also ==
- Pontificia Universidad Javeriana
- Pontificia Universidad Javeriana Faculty of Medicine
