= Jadad scale =

Procedure to assess the quality of clinical trials

The Jadad scale, sometimes known as Jadad scoring or the Oxford quality scoring system, is a procedure to assess the methodological quality of a clinical trial by objective criteria. It is named after Canadian-Colombian physician Alex Jadad who in 1996 described a system for allocating such trials a score of between zero (very poor) and five (rigorous). It is the most widely used such assessment in the world, and as of May 2024, its seminal paper has been cited in over 25,000 scientific works.

== Description ==
The Jadad scale independently assesses the methodological quality of a clinical trial judging the effectiveness of blinding. Alejandro "Alex" Jadad Bechara, a Colombian physician who worked as a Research Fellow at the Oxford Pain Relief Unit, Nuffield Department of Anaesthetics at the University of Oxford described the allocating trials a score of between zero (very poor) and five (rigorous) in an appendix to a 1996 paper. In a 2007 book, Jadad described the randomised controlled trial as "one of the simplest, most powerful and revolutionary forms of research".

== Background ==
Clinical trials are conducted for the purpose of collecting data on the efficacy of medical treatments. The treatment might be, for example, a new drug, a medical device, a surgical procedure, or a preventative regime. Clinical trial protocols vary considerably depending on the nature of the treatment under investigation, but typically, in a controlled trial, researchers gather a group of volunteers and subject some to the test treatment, while giving the others either no treatment (known as a placebo) or an established treatment for comparison. After a defined time period, the patients in the test group are assessed for health improvements in comparison with the control group.

However, trials can vary greatly in quality. Methodological errors such as poor blinding or poor randomisation allow factors such as the placebo effect or selection bias to adversely affect the results of a trial.

=== Randomisation ===
Randomisation is a process to remove potential distortion of statistical results arising from the manner in which the trial is conducted, in particular in the selection of subjects. Studies have indicated, for example, that nonrandomised trials are more likely to show a positive result for a new treatment than for an established conventional one.

=== Blinding ===
The importance of scientific controls to limit factors under test is well established. However, it is also important that none of those involved in a clinical trial, whether the researcher, the subject patient or any other involved parties, should allow their own prior expectations to affect reporting of results. The placebo effect is known to be a confounding factor in trials; affecting the ability of both patients and doctors to report accurately on the clinical outcome. Experimental blinding is a process to prevent bias, both conscious and subconscious, skewing results.

Blinding frequently takes the form of a placebo, an inactive dummy that is indistinguishable from the real treatment. Blinding can however be difficult to achieve in some trials, for example, surgery or physical therapy. Poor blinding can exaggerate the perceived effects of treatment, particularly if any such effects are small. Blinding should be appropriate to the study, and is ideally double blind, wherein neither the patient nor doctor is aware of whether they are in the control or test group, eliminating any such psychological effects from the study.

=== Withdrawals and dropouts ===
Withdrawals and dropouts are those patients who fail to complete a course of treatment, or fail to report back on its outcome to the researchers. The reasons for doing so might be varied: the individuals may have moved away, abandoned the course of treatment, or died. Whatever the reason, the attrition rate can skew results of a study, particularly for those subjects who ceased treatment due to perceived inefficacy. In smoking cessation studies, for example, it is routine to consider all dropouts as failures.

== Jadad questionnaire ==
A three-point questionnaire forms the basis for a Jadad score. Each question was to be answered with either a yes or a no. Each yes would score a single point, each no zero points; there were to be no fractional points. The Jadad team stated that they expected it should take no longer than ten minutes to score any individual paper. The questions were as follows: Was the study described as randomized?, Was the study described as double blind? and Was there a description of withdrawals and dropouts?

To receive the corresponding point, an article should describe the number of withdrawals and dropouts in each of the study groups, and the underlying reasons. Additional points were given if: The method of randomisation was described in the paper, and that method was appropriate. or The method of blinding was described, and it was appropriate.

Points would be deducted if: The method of randomisation was described, but was inappropriate, or The method of blinding was described, but was inappropriate.

A clinical trial could therefore receive a Jadad score of between zero and five. The Jadad scale is sometimes described as a five-point scale, though there are only three questions.

== Uses ==
The Jadad score may be used in a number of ways:

1. To evaluate the general quality of medical research in a particular field.
2. To set a minimum standard for the paper's results to be included in a meta analysis. A researcher conducting a systematic review for example might elect to exclude all papers on the topic with a Jadad score of 3 or less.
3. For critical analysis of an individual paper.

As of 2008, the Jadad score was the most widely used such assessment in the world, and its seminal paper has been cited in over 3000 scientific works.

== Criticism ==
Critics have charged that the Jadad scale is flawed, being over-simplistic and placing too much emphasis on blinding, and can show low consistency between different raters. Furthermore, it does not take into account allocation concealment, viewed by The Cochrane Collaboration as paramount to avoid bias.

== See also ==
- Consolidated Standards of Reporting Trials
- Metascience
- Unblinding
