= Alex Jadad =

Colombian-Canadian physician, philosopher and writer (born 1963)

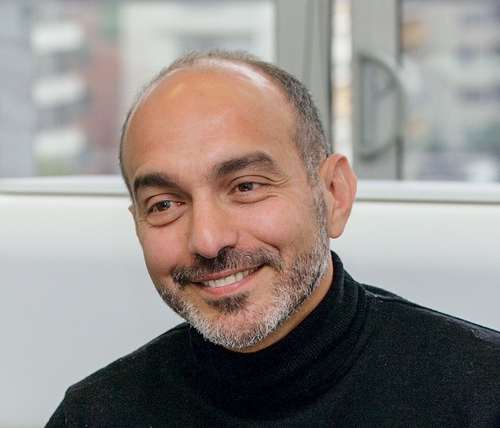
- Jadad in 2023
- Born: Alejandro R. Jadad Bechara; August 9, 1963 (age 63); Medellín, Colombia
- Education: Pontificia Universidad Javeriana; University of Oxford
- Known for: Jadad Scale; Evidence-based medicine; Systematic reviews; Clinical trials; Bias; eHealth innovation; Collaborative decision-making; Computational Management
- Spouse: Martha Garcia (m. 1988)
- Children: 2 (Alia and Tamen Jadad-Garcia)
- Scientific career
- Fields: Future of Health and Medicine; Jadad Scale; Evidence-based medicine; Systematic reviews; Clinical trials; Bias detection and reduction; Pain relief; End-of-life care; Artificial intelligence; Machine learning; Medical innovation; Computational Management; Human-machine collaboration
- Workplaces: University of Oxford; McMaster University; University Health Network; University of Toronto
- Doctoral advisor: Henry McQuay
- Other academic advisors: David Sackett; Iain Chalmers; Murray Enkin

Alex Jadad (born August 9, 1963) is a Canadian-Colombian physician-scientist, clinical epidemiologist and public health scholar. His work focuses on evidence-based medicine, networks of trust, simulation scenarios, digital health, end-of-life care and human-machine collaboration. He is also known as the developer of the Jadad Scale, the first validated tool to assess the methodological quality of clinical trials, and the Founder of the Centre for Global eHealth Innovation (now the Centre for Digital Therapeutics) in Toronto, a simulator of the future of healthcare and medicine.

In 2021, he became member of the global Public Health Leadership Coalition, a group assembled by the World Federation of Public Health Associations from members of over 130 national and international public health organizations, to propose evidence-informed options with which to tackle existential threats in the 21st century.

== Early life and education ==
Born in Medellín, Colombia, Jadad earned a Doctor of Medicine degree from Xavierian Pontifical University in Bogotá in 1986, specializing in anesthesiology in 1990. In the early 1980s, while a medical student, he conducted some of the earliest studies on the jargon, the chemical composition and the clinical implications of an emerging drug of abuse, called 'basuco', later known as "crack" cocaine.

In 1990, he became a Clinical Research Fellow at the Oxford Pain Relief Unit (Now the Oxford Pain Management Centre) of the Nuffield Department of Anaesthetics, University of Oxford, United Kingdom. In 1992, he enrolled as a doctoral student in Balliol College, one of the oldest in the University of Oxford, where he received in 1994 the degree of Doctor of Philosophy (DPhil) in Clinical Medicine. His doctoral thesis, entitled "Meta-analysis of Controlled Trials on Pain Relief", contributed to the development of methods for analyzing big data, identifying and synthesizing health information, and influenced the formation of the Cochrane Collaboration. He has also received honorary doctorates from St. Xavier University in Canada (Laws, 2016) and the Open University of Catalonia in Spain (Arts, 2018), for his contributions to health and innovation.

== Areas of interest ==
=== Pain relief ===
During his time at Oxford, Jadad conducted clinical research on multiple analgesic modalities, and demonstrated that neuropathic pain ("pain in numb areas due to nerve damage") could be relieved by opioids.

As part of his doctoral work, he led the creation of the largest database of clinical trials in pain relief, developing new methods to optimize searches of the US National Library of Medicine, complementing them with manual screening of over 1.3 million pages of scholarly journals since 1948 to 1990. This resulted in the compilation of over 8,000 citations of clinical trials on pain relief, and new statistical techniques for the combination of their results, which provided the foundations for the Cochrane Pain, Palliative Care and Supportive Care (PaPaS) Collaborative Review Group.

He was also one of the inaugural members of the Initiative on Methods, Measurement, and Pain Assessment in Clinical Trials (IMMPACT), an international collaborative effort to develop consensus reviews and recommendations for improving the design, execution, and interpretation of clinical trials of treatments for pain.

=== Evidence-based decision-making ===
Jadad's doctoral thesis also included the development of the Jadad scale, the first validated tool to assess the methodological quality of clinical trials. As of October 2025, it had been cited more than 24,600 times in the biomedical literature, being used to identify systematic differences among studies of the same healthcare interventions in more than 10,000 reviews of research in virtually all areas in the healthcare sector.

In 1995, he joined McMaster University in Canada. During this period, he was Director of the Health Information Research Unit; Co-director of the Canadian Cochrane Centre and Network, Associate Medical Director of the Program in Evidence-based ofballiol Cancer Care Ontario, and the Founding Director of the McMaster Evidence-based Practice Center (the first of its kind funded by the US government overseas), and Professor in the Department of Clinical Epidemiology and Biostatistics.

In 1998, Jadad authored the book with which the British Medical Journal celebrated the 50th anniversary of modern clinical trials. A new edition, co-written with Murray Enkin, was published in 2007.

=== Supportive, palliative and end-of-life care ===
In 2000, Jadad joined the University of Toronto as Professor in the Faculty of Medicine, and Inaugural Rose Family Chair in Supportive Care (a post he held until 2010), conducting research on the concepts of health and end-of-life care, innovations aimed at supporting individuals with chronic or terminal illnesses, conditions associated with a "good death" and the perspectives of healthcare staff on end-of-life care.

In 2013, he co-authored the World Innovation Summit for Health's report 'Dying Healed: Transforming End-Of-Life Care through Innovation', an effort led by Sir Thomas Hughes-Hallett, designed to promote best national practices and a global agenda for optimal care at the end of life.

=== Digital health ===
In 2000, he also became the Founding Director of the Program in eHealth Innovation and Professor in the Department of Anesthesia in the Faculty of Medicine, and in the Institute for Health Policy, Management and Evaluation at the University of Toronto. In this capacity, he led the creation of the Centre for Global eHealth Innovation, (now, The Centre for Digital Therapeutics), designed to study and optimize the use of the information and communication technologies (ICTs) before their introduction into the health system. To support this work, in 2002, Jadad was awarded the Canada Research Chair in eHealth Innovation (Tier 1), which he held until 2015. During this period, he led some of the earliest key studies on the language of digital health; patterns of Internet use among health professionals and patients; ways to improve people's ability to evaluate the quality of online health information; the effect of virtual communities on health; new approaches to use online tools to promote evidence-based decision-making in healthcare; and new ways of using digital tools to respond to major threats to public health (e.g., obesity, complex chronic diseases and pandemics); while anticipating and assessing the risk of harm associated with digital technologies, including wearable devices.

== Global collaborative efforts ==
=== The meaning of ‘health’ ===
In 2008, Jadad led a global conversation about the meaning of health through the British Medical Journal. This effort included contributions from experts in 52 countries, and resulted in the conceptualization of health as 'the ability to adapt and manage' the physical, mental or social challenges faced by individuals or communities throughout life. In 2018, such efforts led to the description of an integrated network of services that enabled 88.6% and 93.1% of its users to experience positive levels of self-reported health and well-being, while ranking first when compared with the performance of the health systems of the 36 countries that are members of the Organization for Economic Cooperation and Development (OECD). Trust among payers, service-providing institutions, professionals and users of health services was the key to achieving these results with only 25% of the average expenditure across the OECD.

=== Complex chronic disease management ===
In 2010, he was the Editor-in-Chief of When people live with multiple chronic diseases: A collaborative approach to an emerging global challenge, a book co-created globally using digital technologies. The same year, he chaired and convened the Global People-Centred eHealth Innovation Forum in the European Ministerial Conference.

Jadad also conducted research showing that only 2% of clinical trial reports published in top journals included patients with multiple chronic diseases explicitly, limiting the clinical value of research evidence in this area, and motivating calls for study designs aligned with the needs of the group that is responsible for most of the expenditures in the healthcare system.

=== Public health leadership ===
From 2016 to 2019, he was Director of the Institute for Global Health Equity and Innovation, in the Dalla Lana School of Public Health, University of Toronto, a tenure that followed the Global Summit 'Creating a Pandemic of Health', an international event that he co-hosted.

In 2019, he became a member of the Council of the Wise, a group of 43 experts in eight different areas charged by the government of Colombia to produce recommendations about the future of the country in the following 25 years.

In 2021, he was selected as one of the members of the Public Health Leadership Coalition, a group assembled by the World Federation of Public Health Associations to foster evidence-informed decisions and bold new ways to tackle the most pressing threats to the health and survival of humanity in the 21st century.

In 2024, he co-chaired the health track of the World Design Policy Conference in San Diego, California, bringing together experts from around the world to imagine and identify the building blocks of a trust-based, positive-sum, scalable and resilient health system for all in the 21st century.

== Selected publications ==
=== Scholarly articles ===
- Jadad, AR (1985). Basuco (Free-base cocaine). Revista Colombiana de Anestesiologia (Colombian Journal of Anesthesiology). 13:257–267
- Jadad, A.R; Carroll, D; Glynn, C.J; McQuay, H.J; Moore, R.A (June 1992). Morphine responsiveness of chronic pain: double-blind randomised crossover study with patient-controlled analgesia. The Lancet. 339 (8806):1367–1371.
- Jadad AR, Carroll D, Moore A, McQuay H (August 1992). Developing a database of published reports of randomised clinical trials in pain research. Pain. 66 (2–3):239–46.
- Jadad AR, Browman GP (December 1995). The WHO analgesic ladder for cancer pain management: stepping up the quality of its evaluation. JAMA. 274(23):1870-3.
- Jadad, AR, Moore, RA, Carroll, D; Jenkinson C; Reynolds DJM, Gavaghan D, McQuay HJ (February 1996). Assessing the quality of reports of randomized clinical trials: Is blinding necessary?. Controlled Clinical Trials. 17(1):1–12.
- Jadad AR, Cook DJ, Browman GP (May 1997). A guide to interpreting discordant systematic reviews. CMAJ. 156(10):1411-6.
- Jadad AR, Gagliardi A (February 1998). Rating health information on the Internet: navigating to knowledge or to Babel?. JAMA. 279(8):611-4.
- Jadad, AR. (September 1999). Promoting partnerships: challenges for the internet age. BMJ. 319(7212):761-764.
- Jadad, AR, Haynes RB, Hunt D, Browman GP. (February 2000). The Internet and evidence-based decision-making: a needed synergy for efficient knowledge management in health care. CMAJ. 162(3):362-365.
- Eysenbach G, Jadad AR. (April–June 2001). Evidence-based patient choice and consumer health informatics in the Internet age. Journal of Medical Internet Research, 3(2):e841.
- Crocco AG, Villasis-Keever M, Jadad AR (June 2002). Analysis of cases of harm associated with use of health information on the internet. JAMA. 287(21):2869-71.
- Jadad AR, Rizo CA, Enkin MW. (June 2003). I am a good patient, believe it or not. BMJ. 326(7402), 1293-1295.
- Oh H, Rizo C, Enkin M, Jadad A. (February 2005). What is eHealth (3): a systematic review of published definitions. Journal of Medical Internet Research, 7(1):e110.
- Jadad AR, Enkin MW, Glouberman S, Groff P, Stern A. (April 2006). Are virtual communities good for our health?. BMJ. 332(7547):925-926.
- Jadad AR., Enkin MW. (January 2007). Computers: transcending our limits?. BMJ. 334(suppl 1):s8-s8.
- Jadad AR, O’Grady L. (December 2008). How should health be defined?. BMJ. 337:a2900.
- Smith R, O'Grady L, Jadad AR. (August 2009). In search of health. Journal of Evaluation in Clinical Practice, 15(4):743-744.
- Shachak A, Jadad AR. (February 2010). Electronic health records in the age of social networks and global telecommunications. JAMA. 303(5):452-453.
- O’Grady L, Jadad A. (November 2010). Shifting from shared to collaborative decision making: a change in thinking and doing. Journal of Participatory Medicine. 2(13):1-6.
- Enkin M, Jadad AR, Smith R (December 2011). "Death can be our friend". BMJ. 343: d8008.
- Bender JL, Yue RYK, To MJ, Deacken L, Jadad AR. (2013). A lot of action, but not in the right direction: systematic review and content analysis of smartphone applications for the prevention, detection, and management of cancer. Journal of Medical Internet Research. 15(12): e2661.
- Jadad AR, Fandiño M, Lennox R (February 2015). Intelligent glasses, watches and vests… oh my! Rethinking the meaning of “harm” in the age of wearable technologies. JMIR mHealth and uHealth. 3(1):e3565.
- Jadad AR. (November 2016). Creating a pandemic of health: What is the role of digital technologies?. Journal of Public Health Policy. 37 (2): 260–268. doi:10.1057/s41271-016-0016-1. ISSN 1745-655X. PMID 27899800. S2CID 29935476.
- Jadad AR, Jadad Garcia TM (November 2019). From a Digital Bottle: A Message to Ourselves in 2039. Journal of Medical Internet Research. 21(11):e16274.
- Rogosnitzky M, Berkowitz E, Jadad AR (May 2020). Delivering benefits at speed through real-world repurposing of off-patent drugs: the COVID-19 pandemic as a case in point. JMIR Public Health and Surveillance. 6(2):e19199.
- Zaman M, Espinal-Arango S, Mohapatra A, Jadad AR (September 2021). What would it take to die well? A systematic review of systematic reviews on the conditions for a good death. The Lancet Healthy Longevity. 2(9):e593-600.
- Jadad AR (December 2021). Facing Leadership that Kills’. Journal of Public Health Policy. 42(4):651. (recognized as Paper of the Year, an award sponsored by the Journal of Public Health Policy, during the 2023 American Public Health Association Meeting.)
- Jadad-Garcia T; Jadad AR. (February 2024). The Foundations of Computational Management: A Systematic Approach to Task Automation for the Integration of Artificial Intelligence into Existing Workflows. arXiv:2402.05142.
- Jadad-Garcia T, Jadad AR (October 2024). Cracking the code: Lessons from 15 years of digital health IPOs for the era of AI. arXiv:2410.02709.
- Jadad AR (March 2026). AI Knows What's Wrong But Cannot Fix It: Helicoid Dynamics in Frontier LLMs Under High-Stakes Decisions. arXiv:2603.11559.
- Jadad AR (April 2026). Leading Across the Spectrum of Human-AI Relationships: A Conceptual Framework for Increasingly Heterogeneous Teams. arXiv:2604.27392.

=== Books ===
- Jadad AR. Medical education, professional practice and drug abuse among physicians [Educación médica, práctica profesional y abuso de drogas entre los médicos] Xavierian University Press, Bogota, 1988
- Ruiz AM, Jadad AR. The neurosurgical patient: anesthetic and intensive care: Copilito Press, 1989 [Original title in Spanish: El paciente neuroquirúrgico: manejo anestésico y de cuidados intensivos (with Mario Ruiz Pelaez)
- Jadad AR. Randomized Controlled Trials: A User's Guide. London: BMJ Publishing Group, 1998
- Jadad AR, Enkin MW. Randomized Controlled Trials: Questions, Answers and Musings. Wiley, 2007 ISBN 978-1405132664
- Jadad AR. Unlearning: incomplete musings on the game of life and the illusions that keep us playing. Foresight Links Press, 2008
- Jadad AR, Cabrera A, Martos F, Smith R, Lyons RF. "When people live with multiple chronic diseases: a collaborative approach to an emerging global challenge". Granada: Andalusian School of Public Health, 2010
- Jadad AR. The Feast of Our Life: Flourishing through self-love. Beati Press, 2016
- Herrera-Molina E, Jadad-Garcia T, Librada S, Alvarez A, Rodriguez Z, Lucas MA, Jadad AR (Editor-in-Chief and Senior Author). Beginning from the End: How to transform end of life care by bringing together the power of healthcare, social services and the community. 1st edition. Seville, Spain: New Health Foundation, 2017
- Jadad AR (editor-in-chief and senior author), Arango A, Sepulveda JHD, Espinal S, Rodriguez DG, Wind KS. Unleashing A Pandemic of Health from the workplace: Believing is seeing. 1st edition, Toronto: Beati Press, 2017.
- Serra M, Ospina-Palacio D, Espinal S, Rodriguez D, Jadad AR (Editor-in-Chief). Trusted networks: the key to achieve world-class outcomes on a shoestring. 1st edition, Toronto: Beati Press, 2018.
- Espinosa N, Anez M, Serra M, Espinal S, Rodriguez D, Jadad AR. Toward sustainable well-being for all: People, communities, organizations, societies and creatures. Toronto: Beati Press. 2020.
- Jadad A, Jadad-Garcia T. Healthy No Matter What: How Humans Are Hardwired to Adapt. Crown/Penguin Random House. 2023 .
