= Pontificia Universidad Javeriana =

Colombian private higher education institution founded in 1930

Javeriana University
- Pontificia Universidad Javeriana
- Latin: Pontificia Universitas Xaveriana
- Motto: Sapientia Aedificavit sibi Domum (Latin)
- Motto in English: Wisdom has built a Home for itself
- Type: Private Roman Catholic Research Non-profit Coeducational Higher education institution
- Established: 1623; 403 years ago
- Accreditation: CHQ
- Religious affiliation: Roman Catholic (Jesuit)
- Academic affiliations: CCE; Association of Colombian Universities; Universia
- President: Luis Fernando Múnera Congote, SJ
- Faculty: 3,040
- Undergraduates: 19,682
- Postgraduates: 3,470
- Location: Carrera 7 No. 40 – 62 Bogotá D.C., Colombia; 4°37′44″N 74°03′53″W
- Campus: Urban, 445 acres (180 ha)
- Language: Mostly Spanish
- Radio Station: Javeriana Estéreo 91.9 FM
- Colors: Blue; White; Yellow
- Nickname: La Javeriana / La Ponti / La Jave
- Website: www.javeriana.edu.co, www.javerianacali.edu.co

The Pontificia Universidad Javeriana (English: Xavierian Pontifical University) is a private university in Colombia founded in 1623. It is one of the oldest and most traditional Colombian universities, directed by the Society of Jesus, with its main facilities in Bogotá and a second campus in Cali. "La Javeriana", as it is known by its students, has traditionally educated the Colombian upper class. It is one of the 33 universities entrusted to the Society of Jesus in Latin America and one of 167 around the world.

The Bogotá campus has 18 schools comprising 61 departments and 242 academic programs catering to areas of knowledge, giving the university its multidisciplinary nature. It has 45 buildings in 445 acres (1.80 km^{2}). The Pance, Cali campus offers 18 schools in four faculties. Its Law School recently received a high-quality accreditation by Resolution 6808 on 6 August 2010, from the Ministry of National Education. The campus in Cali has sectional divisions of the Bolsa de Valores de Colombia (BVC), Temple University's Fox School of Business, and others.

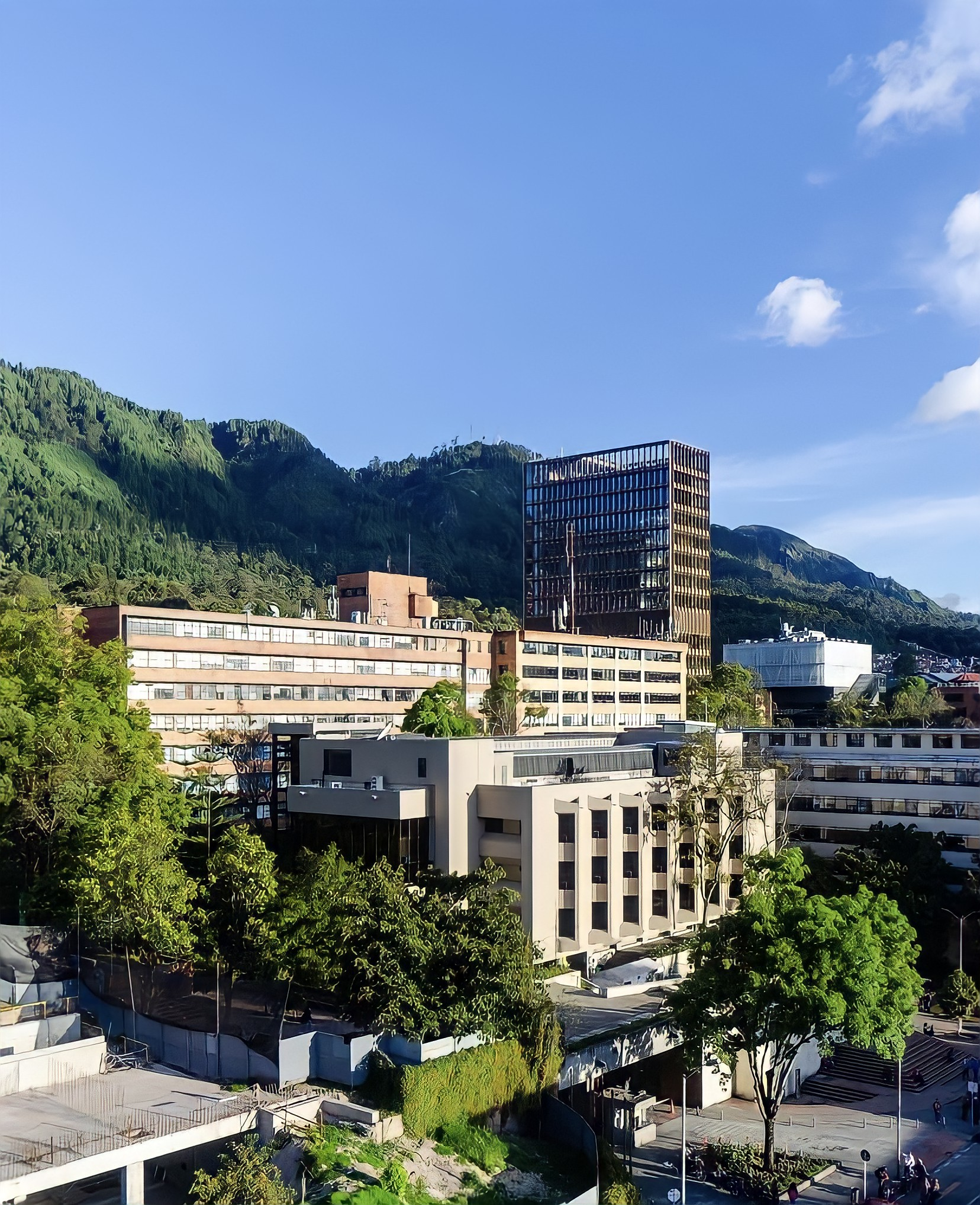
Javeriana University

The university is one of the twelve universities in Colombia having a high-quality institutional accreditation, granted to it for eight years by Resolution 1320, 12 June 2003, of the Ministry of National Education.

The university has 21 undergraduate programs with high-quality accreditation, and eight programs in advanced stages of the accreditation process. In graduate programs, quality is acknowledged through the Qualified Registries. The university has over 87 graduate programs. According to the QS World University Rankings in 2023, the university was ranked #382 globally, #18 in Latin America, and #3 in Colombia.

== History ==
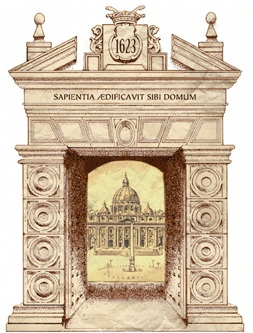
Old University gate, today Museum of Colonial Art

The College of the Society of Jesus was established in Santafé de Bogotá in 1604 as part of the San Bartolome School and Cloister. In 1623, the Audience and the Archbishop recognized the academic degrees conferred by the college. The students at that time received their degree, including Pedro Claver. That is the origin of what was known as the University and Academy of Saint Francis Xavier. In 1767, the Jesuits were expelled from the Spanish colonies, which closed the first stage of Universidad Javeriana's history.

Then 163 years after the university closed, an act of restoration was signed. In 1937, the School of Economics and Legal Sciences was founded, with the others following. In 1970, after multiple petitions from the community of Pance, Cali, the university started a program in that city. The Universidad Javeriana in Cali took the name of "Cali Branch", offering degrees in business, engineering, and psychology.

== Campus ==
=== Main Campus in Bogotá ===
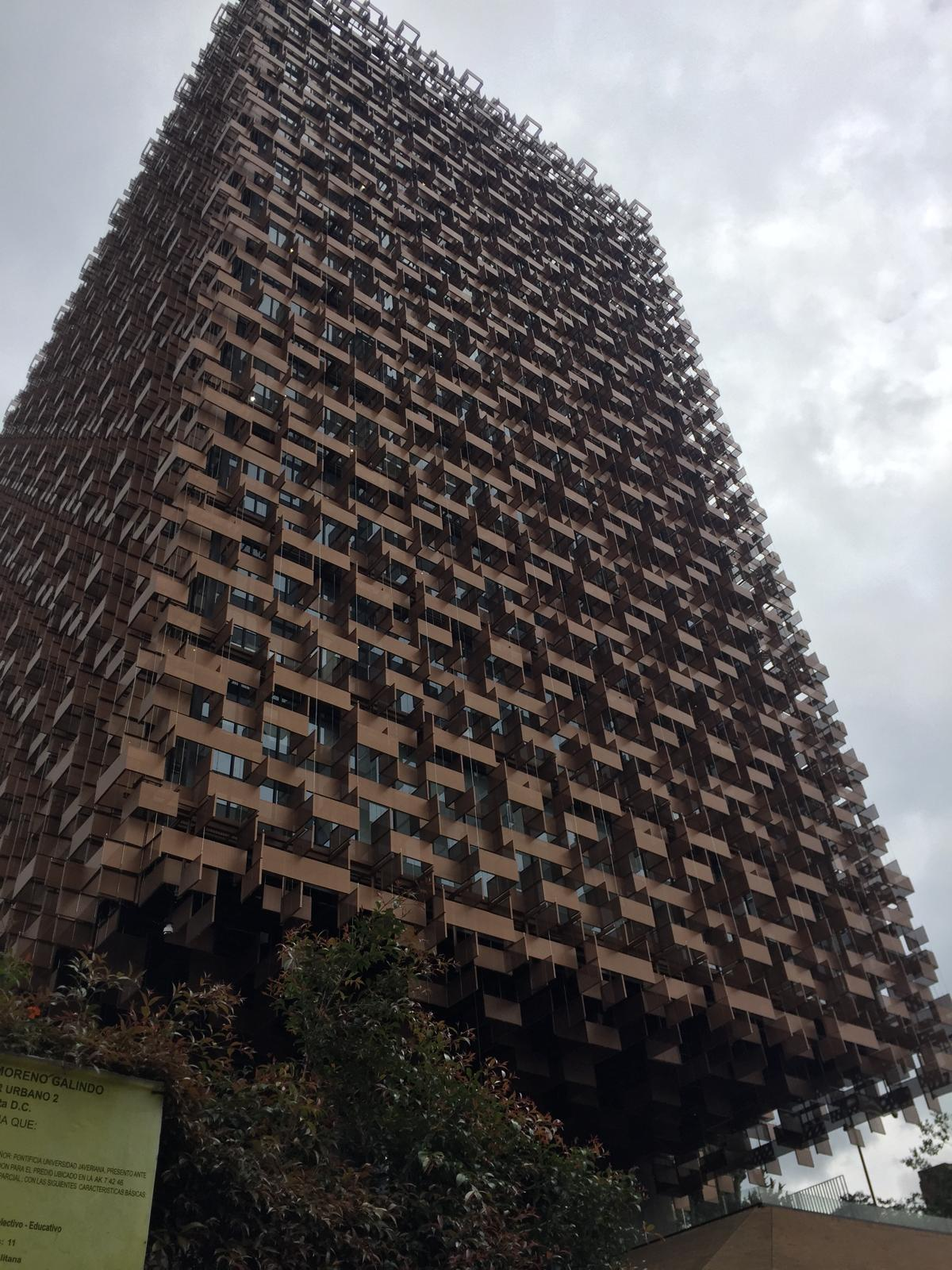
Pontificia Universidad Javeriana-Bogota campus entrance

The university's main campus has a total area of 445 acres (180ha) and approximately 202,988 spared meters of construction. Inside, there are a total of 45 buildings, 18 cafeterias, 1 university bookstore, a hospital, 1 parking block building with 1200 parking spaces, and 1 travel agency. The main campus is located inside the locality of Chapinero in eastern Bogotá since 1940. This campus borders city landmarks such as the Parque Nacional Enrique Olaya Herrera to the south, Carrera Séptima (seventh street) on the west end, the Eastern Hills (Bogotá) and the Chapinero Block to the north. Today this university maintains its open campus environment that allows pedestrians to walk on the interior.

A brief history of some of the university's buildings: Most Buildings are named after previous presidents or deceased Jesuit Faculty members.

- 1951: The university begins its modern development with the construction of the Edificio Emilio Arango, S.J., today this building is home to the university's central government and administration.
- 1955: Hospital Universitario San Ignacio is built, home to the school of Medicine.
- 1954: The inauguration of the Edificio Félix Restrepo, S.J. alongside the programs of Bacteriology, Art and Decorations, Law, Nursing, Commerce, and Philosophy.
- 1958: The Architecture workshops are opened.
- 1959: Female in-campus Housing facilities, which today is known as Edificio Carlos Ortiz, S.J.
- 1976: The Jesús María Fernandez, S.J. Building is open to the public. Today it houses the Main library named after Alfonso Borrero Cabal S.J.
- 1980 -1990: The new phase of development begins, with buildings such as José Gabriel Maldonado, S.J. Building, home to the school of Engineering and all its departments.
- 1991: The Gabriel Giraldo, S.J., custom made for The School of Law and The School of Political Science and International Relationships. In 1993, the Lecture room Building Fernando Barón, S.J. is built, and in 1996 the parking lot building with room for 1,200 vehicles.
- 2000: The university expands its physical development to the southeast with the Pedro Arrupe, S.J. Building where the School of Theology is located. Alongside this building there is also the Javeriana Centre for Sport Education (Gym, Sports and Training Facilities) and the Manuel Briceño, S.J. Building for The School of Psychology, The School of Social Sciences, and The School of Philosophy.
- 2008: The university begins construction for "The Master Plan for The Development of The University's Infrastructure" alongside the very strict policy for ecological and environmental preservation. This plan includes the construction of the new Comparative Biology Building (2009), the Faculty of Arts Building (2014), the Jorge Hoyos, S.J. Building (now nicknamed "The Arc" for its peculiar architectural design) which opened in 2016, The ATICO Center (2009), one of the most technologically advanced buildings in Latin America for the Arts and Communication Studies (Atico is an acronym in Spanish for "High Technology, information, and computing").

Development continues with The School of Engineering Laboratory Building (the tallest building on campus with a total of 15 floors) that opened its doors in 2020, the new Science Labs Building, and the Continuing Studies off-campus Building, in the northern part of the city, which is still under construction. The master plan also includes the construction of a new and more modern Hospital, an auditorium capable of holding ceremonies with up to 1,800 people, the new School of Architecture and Design Building, and an expansion to the gym facilities to include an on-campus pool.

=== Cali Branch ===
The Pontificia Universidad Javeriana of Cali is located to the south of the city, in Pance, near the Farallones de Cali, which are part of the Andes Mountain Range. It has a more rural ambiance where vegetation is abundant and is not rare to see local fauna. This campus has eight Buildings: Las Palmas, Guayacanes Building, Lecture Hall of The Lake, Administrative Offices, Samán Building, Almendros Building, Continuing Studies Building, Acacias Building, The Pink Cedar Building, and the Library. Currently, there are 2 more buildings under construction. It also has 5 cafeterias, a bookstore, parking lots, a center for the Colombian Stock Market, and a Subsidiary of the Fox School of Business from Temple University.

== Academics ==
The university offers 46 undergraduate programs and 179 graduate programs including, 94 professional specializations, 45 medical and surgical specializations, 8 dentistry specializations, 72 masters, and 13 PhDs.

=== Schools and departments ===
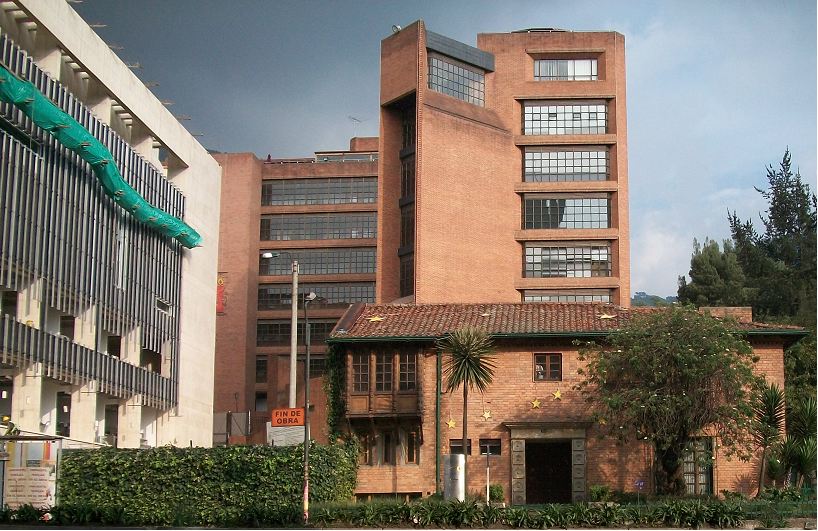

- School of Theology
- School of Philosophy
- School of Medicine
- School of Dentistry
- School of Nursing
- School of Psychology
- School of Law
- School of Political Science and International Relations
- School of Arts: visual arts, performing arts, music
- School of Social Sciences: anthropology, history, literature, sociology, cultural studies
- School of Sciences: biology, mathematics and physics, microbiology, nutrition & biochemistry, chemistry
- School of Engineering: civil engineering, industrial engineering, electronic engineering, systems engineering, telecommunications engineering, mechanical engineering, mechatronics, bioengineering, data science
- School of Economics and Management Sciences: management, accounting, economy, finances.
- School of Education: child pedagogy, basic education emphasizing Spanish and human sciences
- School of Communication and Language: communication studies, information science, languages and linguistics
- School of Design and Architecture: architecture, industrial design, design of visual communication
- School of Environmental and Rural Studies: ecology, rural and regional development

== Research ==
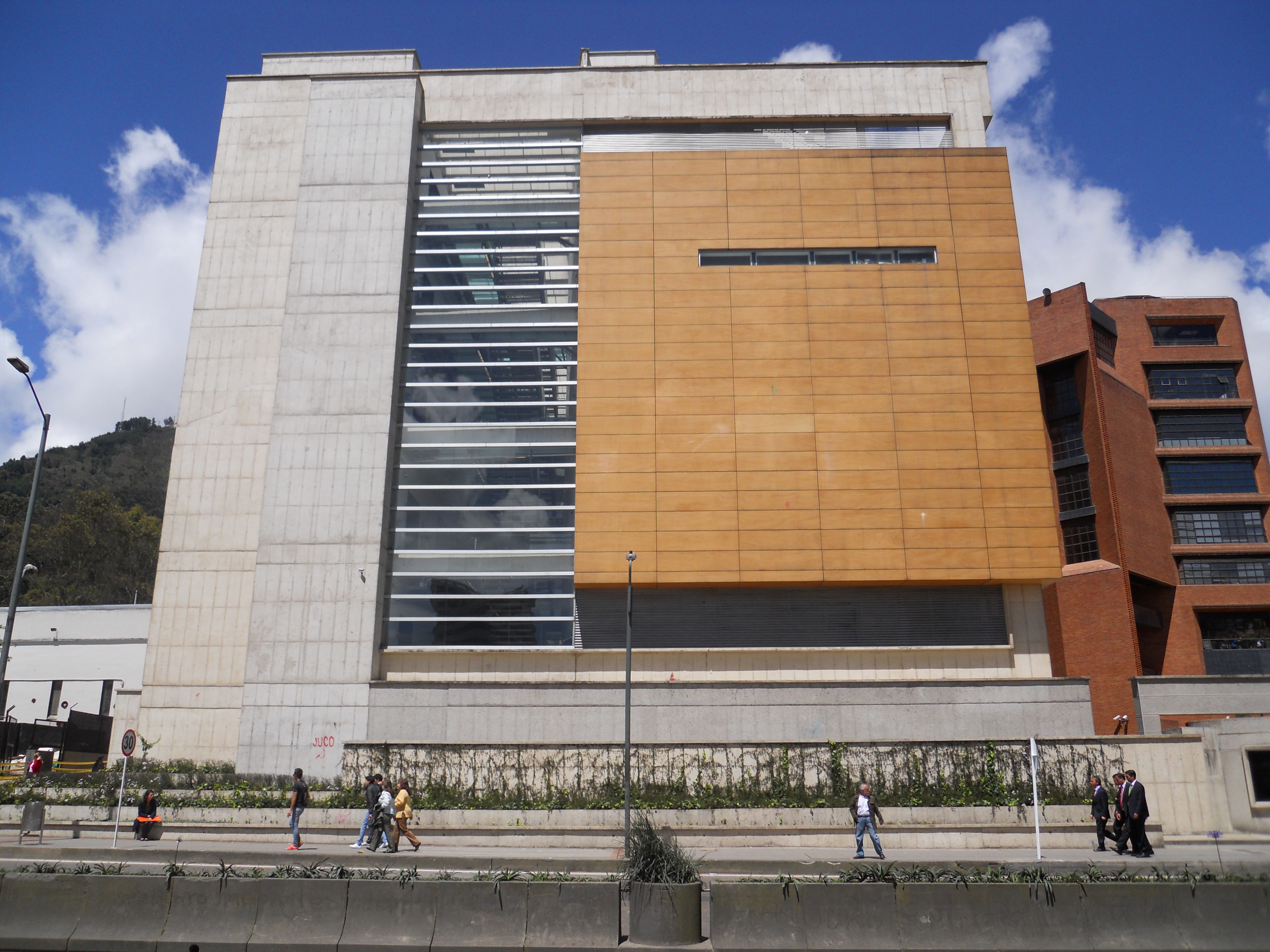
Centro Ático

The university has 61 departments and 14 institutes. Departments are academic units aimed at developing an area of knowledge through research, teaching, and the implementation of services such as continuing education, counseling, and advisory activities. Institutes are academic units responsible for research and consulting in areas requiring a special interdisciplinary approach.

To provide technological support to research, education, service and administrative processes, the university has next-generation network services. Mention can be made of the technological components available in the following units: The SIU (University Information System, acronym in Spanish) with its "People Soft" platform for Academic Management; the New Technologies-Aided Education Center (CEANTIC) that offers virtual courses support through its Blackboard platform; the Centro Audiovisual Javeriano, with front edge technology in this field in Latin America, internationally accredited like Autodesk Training Center-ATC; the Computer-Aided Architecture and Design Project, CAAD; the Technological Industrial Automation Center; the Geo-referenced Information Center, GIC; the Javeriana Center of Oncology; the San Ignacio University Hospital; and the Magnetic Resonance Imaging Center. It has 130 laboratories and workshops.

La Javeriana is among the leading universities researching the Muisca people and culture.

== Libraries ==
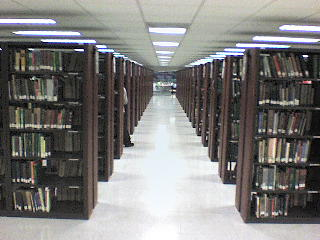

The Xavierian University has four libraries: The General Library, the Mario Valenzuela, S.J., Library, which specializes in philosophy and theology, the Alfonso Llano Escobar, S.J. Bio-ethics Library, and the CIRE (Centre for Ignatius Reflection and Exercises) Library. It has seven document and resource centers in the following fields of knowledge: bio-ethics, political science, architecture, psychology, law, insurance, social communication, and clinical epidemiology.

The library stock numbers 418,008 titles among books, magazines, journals, thesis and dissertation papers, music scores, maps, VHS and DVD film recordings, slides, sound videos, and sound recordings. The system has about 90 subscriptions to databases and has access to complete text contents for online consultation of journals, books, thesis and dissertation papers, and digital format slides.

It offers services such as the drafting of bibliographic references on specialized subjects and bibliographic exchange allowing data gathering that includes journal articles and other documents from libraries in Colombia and around the world. It serves the Javeriana community throughout a 24-hour schedule, Monday through Friday.

== University Presidents and Executive Officers ==
=== Colonial Era University Presidents ===
1. Baltasar Mas Burgués, S.J. – 1623
2. Sebastián Murillo, S.J. – 1628
3. Francisco de Fuentes, S.J. – 1636
4. Francisco Sarmiento, S.J. – 1639
5. Baltasar Mas Burgués, S.J. – 1641
6. Juan Manuel, S.J. – 1642 – 1645
7. Pedro Fernández, S.J. – 1646
8. Juan Gregorio, S.J. – 1651
9. Francisco Varaiz, S.J. – 1653
10. Juan Gregorio, S.J. – 1657
11. Gaspar Cujía, S.J. – 1659
12. Bartolomé Pérez, S.J.
13. Juan de Santiago, S.J. – 1673
14. Juan Martínez R., S.J. – 1677 – 1681
15. Francisco Alvarez, S.J. – 1682
16. Pedro de Mercado, S.J. – 1686
17. Pedro Calderón, S.J. – 1706
18. Diego de Tapia, S.J. – 1733 – 1734
19. Mateo Mimbela, S.J. – 1735
20. Francisco Cataño, S.J. – 1737
21. Jaime López, S.J. – 1738 – 1741
22. Tomás Casabona, S.J. – 1743 – 1749
23. Ignacio Ferrer, S.J. – 1756
24. Manuel Román, S.J. – 1761
25. Manuel Zapata, S.J. – 1764 – 1765
26. Nicolás Candela, S.J. – 1767

=== Modern University Presidents ===
1. José Salvador Restrepo, S.J. 1930 – 1932
2. Jesús María Fernández, S.J. 1932 – 1935
3. Alberto Moreno, S.J. (E) 1935
4. Carlos Ortiz, S.J. 1935 – 1941
5. Francisco Javier Mejía, S.J.(E) 1941
6. Félix Restrepo, S.J. 1941 – 1950
7. Emilio Arango, S.J. 1950 – 1955
8. Carlos Ortiz, S.J. (E) 1955 – 1956; (rector) 1956 – 1960
9. Jesús Emilio Ramírez, S.J. 1960 – 1966
10. Fernando Barón, S.J. 1966 – 1970
11. Alfonso Borrero, S.J. 1970 – 1977
12. Roberto Caro, S.J. 1977 – 1983
13. Jorge Hoyos Vásquez, S.J. 1983 – 1989
14. Gerardo Arango Puerta, S.J. 1989 – 1998
15. Gerardo Remolina Vargas, S.J. 1999 – 2007
16. Joaquín Emilio Sánchez, S.J. 2007 – 2014
17. Jorge Humberto Pelaez Piedrahita, S.J. 2014 – 2023
18. Luis Fernando Múnera Congote, SJ 2023—

=== Current Executive Officers ===
- Great Chancellor: Adolfo Nicolás, S.J.
- Vice Great Chancellor: Carlos Eduardo Correa Jaramillo, S.J.
- President: Jorge Humberto Peláez Piedrahita, S.J.
- Provost: Luis David Prieto Martínez
- Vice President for University Welfare: Luis Alfonso Castellanos Ramírez, S.J.
- Vice President for Administration: Catalina Martinez de Rozo
- Vice President for Interinstitutional Relations: Luis Fernando Álvarez Londoño, S.J.
- Vice President for Research: Luis Miguel Renjifo
- General Secretary: Jairo Humberto Cifuentes Madrid

== Cali Branch ==
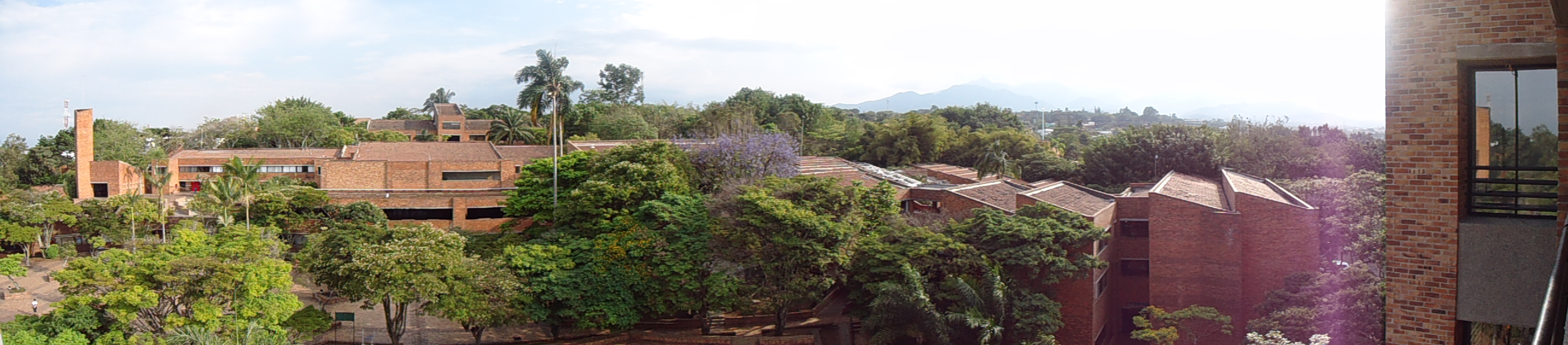
Campus overview, Pontificia Universidad Javeriana Cali.

On 6 October 1970, responding to requests from the local community and the efforts of a group of practicing accountants who aspired to obtain the university degree, a Program of Public Accounting began in Cali. This was the origin of the Cali branch of the Javeriana University. On 20 November 1978, the board proposed the name Cali Branch, with headquarters in the capital under the same organization and higher authorities. The board of regents, at the request of the board, adopted the name Cali Branch.

The campus of the Pontificia Universidad Javeriana Cali is located in the south of the city, in Pance, at the foot of the Farallones de Cali, part of the Cordillera Occidental, in a totally rural environment where vegetation and fauna abound. The campus consists of nine buildings (Las Palmas, Guayacanes, classrooms block, administration, Saman, Almendros, continuing education, Las Acacias and Cedro Rosado). The campus features multiple cafés and restaurants, the Javeriana Shop, a large parking lot surrounding the entire campus, a branch of Corpbanca, a center of the Colombia Stock Exchange, and an MBA extension of Temple University Fox School of Business and Management.

The campus includes Alfonso Borrero Cabal auditorium; Central Library, one of the most complete in the Colombian Southwest; Loyola Sports Center; the office of entrepreneurship "Campus Nova", which fosters entrepreneurial talent within the university; and the Javeriano Writing Center.

The university has 35 research groups attached to the government Administrative Department of Science, Technology and Innovation; and a station, Javeriana Stereo FM 107.5 with a wide audience in the Colombian Southwest. It offers students opportunities in more than 87 countries and boasts 120 academic cooperation agreements with universities abroad.

Currently, the Pontificia Universidad Javeriana Cali offers 19 undergraduate programs of which eight have received quality accreditation by the Ministry of Education (Civil Engineering, Electronics Engineering, Industrial Engineering, Systems Engineering and Computer Science, Business Administration, Accounting law and Psychology). The Cali branch of the Faculty of Health Sciences inaugurated the Moot Hospital.

In March 2012, the Pontificia Universidad Javeriana Cali received the Institutional Accreditation of High Quality from the Ministry of Education for eight years, placing it among the more competitive private universities in the country.

== Alumni ==
Defense of Doctoral Thesis of Don José Antonio Zelis at Javeriana University (1759) by Joaquín Gutiérrez. Colonial Art Museum of Bogotá.

Javeriana's alumni include a vast range of prominent individuals in the history of the country and the region, with the following (non-exhaustive) list representative, including Presidents of Colombia, Vice Presidents of Colombia, National and International Ministers, Grammy Award-winning artists, Academy Award-nominated artists, Tony Award-nominated artists, Miss Universe, Olympic medallists and people included in Forbes and BBC lists.

- Camilo Prieto Valderrama, climate science professor and environmentalist.
- Ernesto Samper, President of Colombia (1994–1998)
- Daniel Samper Pizano, lawyer, journalist, and writer
- Daniel Samper Ospina, comedian, writer, journalist, and columnist
- Misael Pastrana, president of Colombia (1970–1974)
- Marta Lucía Ramírez, vice president of Colombia (2018–2022); 2021 Forbes list of the Colombian 50 most powerful woman
- María Juliana Ruiz, first lady of Colombia (2018–2022)
- Rodolfo Llinás, neuroscientist, University Professor at the New York University; Director of the Neurolab Research on the NASA and Ralph W. Gerard Prize laureate
- Luis Carlos Galán Sarmiento, politician
- Gustavo Bell, vice president of Colombia (1998–2002)
- Peter Claver, priest and missionary
- Ignacio Martín-Baró, scholar, psychologist, philosopher and Jesuit priest
- Marcela Ocampo Duque, lawyer, Executive Manager Banco de la Republica
- Vicky Colbert, Politician and Sociologist; 2017 BBC 100 Women
- Catalina Sandino Moreno, Academy Award-nominated actress
- Catalina Robayo, Miss Colombia 2010, placed Top 16 at Miss Universe 2011.
- Alejandro R. Jadad Bechara, physician, innovator, networker and humanist
- Henry Krieger, Broadway producer; Grammy Award-winning and Tony Award-nominated producer
- Ángela Robledo, psychologist, member of the Chamber of Representatives of Colombia
- Fernando Araújo Perdomo, former Minister of Foreign Affairs of Colombia (2007–2008)
- Noemí Sanín, former minister of Foreign Affairs of Colombia, former ambassador to the United Kingdom and Spain
- Óscar Iván Zuluaga Escobar, former Minister of Finance and Public Credit (2007–2010)
- Juan Carlos Pinzón, former minister of defense (2011–2015) and Ambassador of Colombia to the United States (2015–2017, 2021–)
- Gina Parody, former Minister of Education (2014–2016)
- Aurelio Iragorri Valencia, former minister of interior of Colombia (2013–2018)
- Claudia Blum, psychologist; former minister of foreign affairs (2019–2021)
- Natalia Abello Vives, former minister of transport of Colombia (2014–2018)
- Diego Molano Vega, former Minister of Information Technologies and Communications (2010–2014)
- Carlos Holguín Sardi, former minister of the Interior and Justice in Colombia (2006–2008)
- Juan Camilo Restrepo Salazar, former minister of agriculture and rural development of Colombia (2010–2013)
- Fernando Londoño, former minister of the interior and justice of Colombia (2002–2004)
- Juan Carlos Esguerra Portocarrero, former minister of justice and law of Colombia (2011–2012)
- Ricardo Velez Rodriguez, Brazilian Minister of Education
- Álvaro Gómez Hurtado, former Colombia Ambassador to the United States (1983–1985) and former Colombia ambassador to France (1991–1993)
- Jorge Franco, writer; Alfaguara Prize 2014
- Jorge Alfredo Vargas, news presenter
- Jorge Enrique Abello, actor; participated in Yo soy Betty, la fea, Betty en NY, iCarly and others
- Santiago Gamboa, writer
- Fonseca, singer; Grammy Award-nominated and Latin Grammy Award-winner artist
- Laura Tobón, model, beauty & fashion blogger
- Simón Brand, Hollywood director
- Vanessa de la Torre, journalist
- Riyad al-Maliki, minister of Foreign Affairs of Palestinian Authority
- Ignacio Martín-Baró, Spanish philosopher and psychologist
- Claudia Palacios, former anchor for CNN en Español
- Carlos Pizarro Leongómez, politician, commander of M-19 (dropped out)
- Mario Mendoza Zambrano, writer
- Fernando Vallejo, writer
- Paulina Dávila, actress
- Jackeline Rentería, Olympic medallist (2008, 2012)
- Kristina Lilley, American born-Colombian actress (She studied Biology before she became an actress).
- Paulina Vega, Miss Colombia 2013 and Miss Universe 2014; 2021 Forbes list of the Colombian 50 most powerful woman
- Giancarlo Mazzanti, architect
- Brigitte Baptiste, Environmental scientist and researcher, President of the EAN University and 2021 Forbes list of the Colombian 50 most powerful woman
- Ricardo La Rotta Caballero, architect
- Camilo Prieto Valderrama, surgeon and environmentalist
- Diana Wiswell, actress.
- General Freddy Padilla De León, former commander of the Colombian Armed Forces, former Minister of Defense, ambassador
- María Teresa Herrán, Colombian journalist and artist
- Catalina García, singer (dropped out to co-found Grammy Award-nominated and Latin Grammy Award-winning Colombian musical group Monsieur Periné)

== Lecturers ==
- Miguel Gómez (photographer) (born 1974), Colombian / American photographer, worked in the Fine Arts department for several years.
- Carlos Serrano (born 1963), Colombian classical musician, worked for the music school.

== See also ==
- List of universities in Colombia
- List of colonial universities in Latin America
- List of Jesuit sites
- List of Muisca research institutes
