= AM =

AM or A.M. or Am may refer to:

== Time and date ==
- a.m., ante meridiem, the time period from midnight to noon, written e.g., 6 a.m.
- Anno Mundi, calendar era based on the biblical creation of the world

== Language ==
- I am, first-person singular present of the copula verb to be
- Am (cuneiform), written syllable
- Amharic language (ISO 639-1 language code am)

== Arts and media ==
=== Literature ===
- The Book of Amos, part of the Tanakh and the Old Testament
- Allied Mastercomputer (also called "Adaptive Manipulator" or "Aggressive Menace"), or AM, the antagonist in the short story and video game "I Have No Mouth, and I Must Scream" by American writer Harlan Ellison

=== Radio ===
- AM broadcasting, radio broadcasting using amplitude modulation
- AM (radio program), Australian current affairs radio program

=== Television ===
- American Morning, American morning television news program
- Am, Antes del Mediodía, Argentine current affairs television program
- Am, a character in the anthology Star Wars: Visions
- After Midnight (TV series) (logo: @m), American late-night comedy celebrity game show

=== Music ===
==== Music theory ====
- A minor, musical minor scale
- Am, the symbol for the A-minor chordl

==== Collections of music ====
- A.M. (Chris Young album)
- A.M. (Wilco album)
- AM (Abraham Mateo album)
- AM (Arctic Monkeys album)
- Armeemarschsammlung (Army March Collection), catalog of German military march-music

==== Musicians and groups ====
- AM (musician), American musician
- Andrew Moore (musician), Canadian musician, known as A.M.
- DJ AM, American DJ and producer
- Skengdo & AM, British hip hop duo

== Science and technology ==
=== Mathematics and computing ===
- AM, complexity class related to Arthur–Merlin protocol
- Automated Mathematician, artificial intelligence program
- Agile modeling, software engineering method for modeling and documenting software systems
- .am, file extension associated with Automake software
- .am, Internet domain for Armenia

=== Physics and chemistry ===
- Amplitude modulation, electronic communication technique
- Attometre, unit of length
- Attomolar (aM), unit of molar concentration
- Americium (symbol: Am), chemical element

=== Other uses in science and technology ===
- Adrenomedullin, protein
- Air mass (astronomy), measure of the amount of air along the line of sight in astronomical observations
- Am, tropical monsoon climate in the Köppen climate classification
- Additive manufacturing, also known as 3D printing, process of making three-dimensional copies

== Transportation ==
- Aston Martin, British sportscar manufacturer
- A.M. (automobile), range of automobiles manufactured in France, 1906-14
- Aeroméxico (IATA airline code: AM), airline in Mexico
- Arkansas and Missouri Railroad

== Military and government ==
- A US Navy hull classification symbol: Minesweeper (AM)
- Air marshal, a senior air officer rank used in Commonwealth countries
- Anti-materiel rifle, rifle designed for use against military equipment
- Aviation structural mechanic, U.S. Navy occupational rating
- Member of the Order of Australia, post-nominal letters which can be used by a Member of the Order
- Albert Medal for Lifesaving, post-nominal AM
- Assembly Member (disambiguation), political office
  - Formerly a Member of the National Assembly for Wales, now Member of the Senedd
  - Member of the London Assembly

== Education ==
- Active Minds, a mental health awareness charity
- Arts et Métiers ParisTech, French engineering school
- Australian Museum, in Sydney, Australia

== Countries ==
- Anguilla, LOC MARC code AM
- Armenia (ISO country code AM)

== Other uses ==
- Attacking midfielder, position in association football

== See also ==
- Pro–am
- `am (disambiguation)
- A&M (disambiguation)
- AM2 (disambiguation)
- AMS (disambiguation)
