= AM1 =

AM1, AM-1, or variation, may refer to:

AM1 may refer to:

- Austin Model 1, a model used in quantum physics
- BMW AM1, a version of the 1932 BMW 3/20 car
- British Rail Class AM1, a class of electric multiple unit train
- Socket AM1, a CPU socket from AMD for APUs with an integrated chipset
- Air mass 1 solar energy spectra through one atmosphere thickness

AM-1 may refer to:

- EOS AM-1, a multi-national NASA scientific research satellite in a Sun-synchronous orbit around the Earth
- Ekspress AM-1, a Russian Ekspress satellite launched on 30 October 2004
- Sega AM-1, a computer software development studio
- USS Lapwing (AM-1), a 1918 U.S. Navy minesweeper
- AM-1, a designation of the 1946 AM Mauler aircraft
- Arp-Madore 1, a star-cluster
- АМ-1, "Атом Мирный", the first civilian nuclear power reactor in the world

== See also ==
- AM (disambiguation)
