= Andrew Moore =

Andrew or Andy Moore may refer to:

== Politics ==
- Andrew Moore (politician) (1752–1821), U.S. Representative and Senator from Virginia
- Andrew B. Moore (1807–1873), governor of the U.S. state of Alabama

== Sports ==
- Andy Moore (American football) (1902–1971), American football coach at the University of Chattanooga
- Andy Moore (footballer) (born 1965), English former professional soccer player
- Andrew Moore (Australian footballer) (born 1991), Australian footballer
- Andrew Moore (baseball) (born 1994), American baseball player
- Andy Moore (rugby union, born 1968), Wales international rugby union scrum-half
- Andy Moore (rugby union, born 1974), Wales international rugby union lock forward
- Andrew Moore (speedway rider) (born 1982), English speedway rider

== Other ==
- Andrew Moore (historian), Australian academic and writer
- Andrew Moore (musician) (born 1979), electronic musician also known as A.M.
- Andy Moore (actor), English actor
- Andrew L. Moore (born 1957), American photographer
- Andrew M. T. Moore, archeologist at the Rochester Institute of Technology
- Andrew G. T. Moore II (1935–2018), American attorney and judge in Delaware
- Andrew W. Moore, British-American computer scientist

== See also ==
- Andy Moor (disambiguation)
