= First Battle of the Marne =

First major battle of World War I, 1914

- Part of the Western Front of World War I
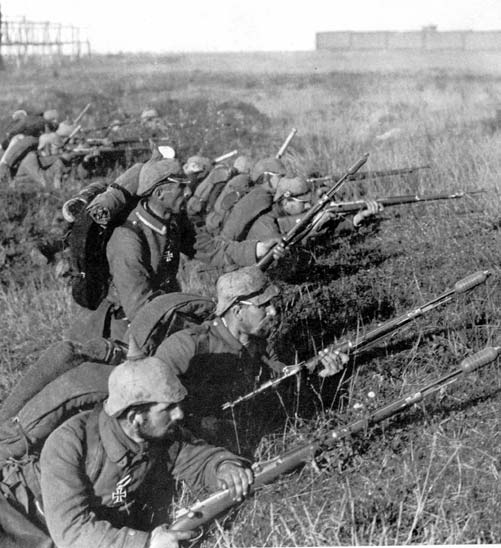
- German soldiers (wearing distinctive pickelhaube helmets with cloth covers) on the front line at the First Battle of the Marne.
| Date | 5–12 September 1914 |
| Location | Marne River near Brasles, east of Paris, France 49°1′N 3°23′E |
| Result | Entente victory: Failure of Schlieffen Plan |
| Territorial changes | German advance to Paris repulsed |

Belligerents
| France; United Kingdom | Germany |

Commanders and leaders
| Joseph Joffre; Joseph Gallieni; Michel-Joseph Maunoury; Louis Franchet d'Espèrey; Ferdinand Foch; Fernand de Langle de Cary; Maurice Sarrail (United Kingdom of Great Britain and Ireland) John French | Helmuth von Moltke; Alexander von Kluck; Karl von Bülow; Max von Hausen; Albrecht von Württemberg; Crown Prince Wilhelm |

Units involved
| French Army: Sixth Army; Fifth Army; Ninth Army; Fourth Army; Third Army; British Expeditionary Force | German Army: First Army; Second Army; Third Army; Fourth Army; Fifth Army |

Strength
| 1,080,000 personnel | 750,000–900,000 personnel |

Casualties and losses
| 250,000 killed or wounded 12,733 killed or wounded | 298,000 casualties 260,000 killed or wounded 38,000 captured... see § Casualties |

The First Battle of the Marne or known in France as the Miracle on the Marne (French: miracle de la Marne) was a battle of the First World War fought from 5 to 12 September 1914. The German army invaded France with a plan for winning the war in 40 days by occupying Paris and destroying the French and British armies. The Germans had initial successes in August. They were victorious in the Battles of Mons and the Frontiers and overran a large area of northern France and Belgium. In what is called the Great Retreat the Germans pursued the retreating French and British forces more than 250 km (160 mi) southwards. The French and British halted their retreat in the Marne River valley, while the Germans advanced to 40 km (25 miles) from Paris.

With the battlefield reverses of August, Field Marshal John French, commander of the British Expeditionary Force (BEF), lost faith in the French and began to plan for a British retreat to port cities on the English Channel for an evacuation to Britain. Joseph Joffre, the French commander, maintained good order in his retreating army and was able to reinforce it with troops from his eastern flank and by integrating military reserve units into the regular army. By early September, the Franco–British forces outnumbered the Germans, who were exhausted after a month-long campaign, had outrun their supply lines and were suffering shortages. On 3 September, the military governor of Paris, Joseph Gallieni, perceived that the German right flank was vulnerable and positioned his forces to attack.

On 4 September Joffre gave the order to begin a counter-offensive. The battle took place between Paris and Verdun, along a west-to-east frontline distance of 230 km (140 mi). The point of decision and the most severe fighting was in the western half of that area. By 9 September, the success of the Franco–British left the German 1st and 2nd Armies at risk of encirclement, and they were ordered to retreat to the Aisne River. The German armies ceased their retreat after 65 km (40 mi) on a line north of the Aisne River, where they dug in on the heights and fought the First Battle of the Aisne. The German retreat from 9 to 12 September marked the end of the German attempt to defeat France quickly. Both sides next commenced reciprocal operations to envelop the northern flank of their opponent in what became known as the Race to the Sea that culminated in the First Battle of Ypres and led to the bloody four-year long stalemate of trench warfare on the Western Front.

The Battle of the Marne from September 5 to 12 resulted in estimated casualties of 250,000 French, 12,733 British and 298,000 Germans. Holger Herwig called the Battle of the Marne the most important land battle of the 20th century, John J. Tierney, Jr, argued it was the most important battle in history. The battle is described in French folklore as the "miracle on the Marne."

== Background ==
The location of the French and German armies about 1 September en route to the Marne River near Chateau-Thierry.

=== The combatants ===
Germany declared war on France on 3 August 1914. Both sides expected a short war. Germany faced the spectre of a two-front war, facing Russia in the east and France and Britain in the west. German strategy was to defeat France in six weeks and then turn its attention to Russia. As envisioned by the Schlieffen Plan (revised by Helmuth von Moltke), the Germans embarked on a rapid, circular, counter-clockwise offensive through Belgium and into France with the objective of capturing Paris and enveloping and destroying the French army east of Paris within their six-week timetable. The German violation of Belgium's neutrality brought the United Kingdom into the war. Britain sent the British Expeditionary Force (BEF) to France.

Germany created seven armies for service on the western front. Three of them on the German right flank would be most involved in the Battle of the Marne. At the beginning of the war, the First Army numbered 320,000 men commanded by Alexander von Kluck; the Second Army had 260,000 men commanded by Karl von Bülow; and the Third Army commanded by Max von Hausen had 180,000 men. These numbers would be depleted by the time of the Marne Battle. The French army stationed on the western front initially consisted of five armies of which the Fourth Army, commanded by Fernand de Langle de Cary, and the Fifth Army, commanded by Charles Lanrezac, on its left flank would be most involved in the Battle of the Marne. Two additional French armies would be created to stem off the German offensive: the 6th Army commanded by Joseph Gallieni, created to protect Paris; and the 9th commanded by Ferdinand Foch. The French armies engaged in the Marne Battle were reinforced by reservists, recruits, and by transfers from other French and colonial armies. French divisions facing the German right wing rose from 17.5 on 23 August to 41 on 6 September, numbering more than 700,000 men. The BEF numbered 130,000 men at the beginning of the war and was commanded by John French.

The Commanders-in-Chief of the armies were a study in contrasts. Moltke, the chief of the German General Staff, remained at his headquarters in Luxembourg throughout the battle. He issued General Directives by way of emissaries from his headquarters, but gave his army commanders wide latitude in their operations. By contrast, the French commander, Joseph Joffre, was a whirlwind of activity (although insisting on fine dining and an uninterrupted eight hours of sleep every night). Joffre visited his armies and their commanders frequently, driven by a Grand Prix race car driver. He was ruthless in firing more than 30 French generals who did not meet his standards (or, as some say, who dared to disagree with him). John French, the British commander, was intimidated by the casualties suffered by the British in initial battles and thereafter reluctant to engage the Germans, but finally played an important role in the Battle of the Marne.

The strategies of the French and Germans likewise contrasted. The French focused their attention, troops, and defences in eastern France where they believed the Germans would be most dangerous. They were wrong. The Germans mostly stayed on defence in the east, although blunting French attacks. In the east, France had the objective of regaining Alsace–Lorraine which it had lost to Germany in the Franco-German war of 1870. The French did not fortify their northwestern border with Belgium as they did not expect the Germans to attack there and also feared being accused of violating Belgian neutrality—and thereby losing British participation in the war. Germany, however, had no compunctions about violating Belgian neutrality as its objective was to win the war quickly before the United Kingdom could intervene decisively. The French and British were outnumbered in contesting the German offensive through Belgium into France.

The Germans recognized that a long war was not in their interest as the resources of France, the United Kingdom, and Russia were far greater than their own. To win the war with France quickly would even the odds. To historian Herwig, the Schlieffen Plan, the violation of Belgian neutrality, and the German invasion of France in 1914 were "an all-or-nothing throw of the dice, a high-risk operation born of hubris and bordering on recklessness."

=== The Great Retreat ===
The Germans and the French had different strategies for what they anticipated would be a short war. France's top priority was to recover Alsace-Lorraine, lost to Germany in the Franco-Prussian War of 1870. Germany's priority was to defeat France quickly, so that it could turn its attention to the Russians. Both armies at the beginning of the war believed that offence would prevail over defence. The French military philosophy has been characterized as the "cult of the offensive," a belief that elan (spirit) and cran (guts) were the essential elements of military victory. The "most terrible August in the history of the world" proved them wrong as artillery and machine guns triumphed over elan and cran. A French lieutenant named Charles de Gaulle said 'that all the courage in the world cannot prevail against gunfire."

August 1914 saw bloody battles, nearly all of which the Germans won, the conquest of most of Belgium by Germany, and the rapid advance of the German armies into France. North and west of Paris, the French and British armies retreated before the German onslaught. East of Paris, the French army launched several offensives into Alsace-Lorraine which failed. France's military Plan XVII anticipated that Germany would concentrate most of its forces in eastern France in Alsace-Lorraine and Joffre clung to that belief, although the commander of the 5th French army, Charles Lanrezac, repeatedly warned him that the Germans were attacking Belgium in numbers exceeding those of his own and the BEF. Retired general Joseph Gallieni also warned Joffre that the German's main effort was in the northwest, not the east.

On 24 August, Joffre finally acknowledged that his northwestern (left) flank was at risk. He abandoned the aggressive Plan XVII and instead proclaimed that the French armies were "forced to take defensive action...to wear down the enemy's strength and resume the offense in due course." The Great Retreat began in which the French 3rd, 4th, and 5th armies and the BEF on the French left began a 300 km (190 miles) retreat, mostly walking rather than fighting. The French were followed by the German 1st (Kluck), 2nd (Bülow), and 3rd (Hausen) armies. Hundreds of thousands of German, French, and British soldiers marched southeast in summer heat, wearing woollen uniforms and carrying 60 lb (27 kg) packs, the Germans motivated by the belief that they would soon capture Paris and end the war. German commanders exulted in their victories, but Chief of General Staff Moltke was worried. The Germans were capturing few prisoners and arms, an indication that the French and British were retreating in good order, not in panic.

During the retreat, Joffre bolstered his defences. He created two new armies. The 6th was to defend Paris with Gallieni as the Military Governor and Michel-Joseph Maunoury as the commander of the 6th army. Gallieni demanded not only garrison troops but also a mobile force to confront the advancing Germans. The 9th army headed by Ferdinand Foch was stationed between the third and fourth French armies. Utilizing the extensive French railway system, Joffre transferred men from the two eastern armies (the 1st and 2nd) to the Marne and integrated semi-trained French reserves into his defence.

Meanwhile, the attacking Germans had outrun their logistics and attrition among its soldiers was high. Kluck's first army had advanced 140 km (87 miles) beyond the railhead which supplied it. Sixty per cent of its motor transport had broken down as had fodder wagons carrying hay for horses. Its men had marched 500 km (310 miles) since leaving Germany one month earlier, fought several battles, and suffered 20,000 men killed, wounded, and ill. The soldiers were "like living scarecrows." With every mile marched southward, the Germans were more isolated from the sources of their supplies while the French were closer to theirs.

Demands for more soldiers on other fronts in the war (and possible over-confidence) resulted in Moltke reducing the number of German attackers in France by 200,000 or more men in August. He transferred two corps to the eastern front to fight the Russians and assigned another two to besiege Antwerp and Maubeuge. The German 1st and 2nd armies on 1 August had 580,000 soldiers; at the Battle of the Marne they had 372,000. By the eve of the battle, the allied forces between Paris and Verdun numbered 980,000 French and 100,000 British soldiers while the Germans numbered 750,000. The Germans had an advantage in artillery with 3,300 to 3,000 guns.

=== The eve of battle ===
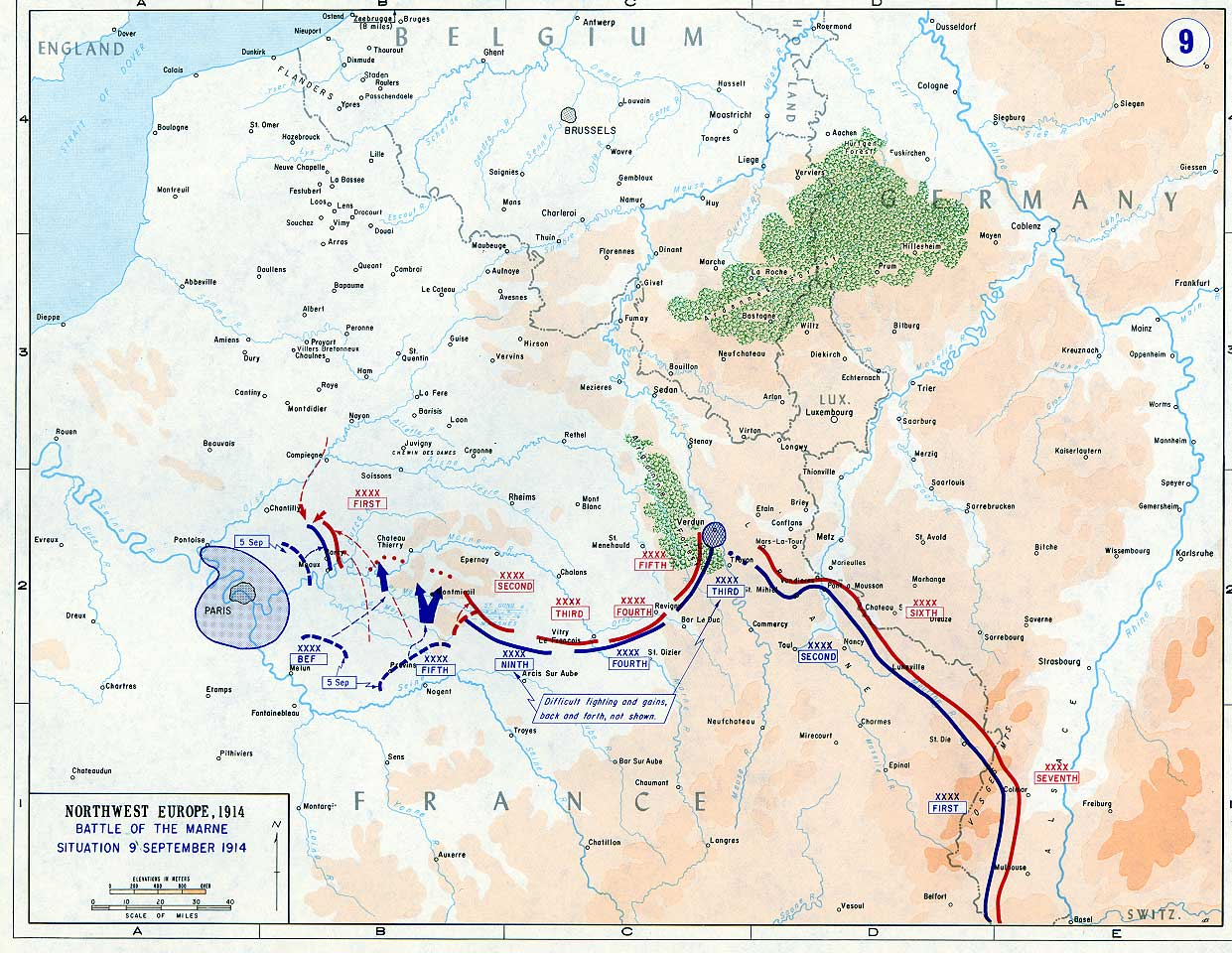

By 2 September, John Keegan said that "the German strategic effort, though neither Moltke nor Kluck perceived it, was beginning to fall apart". Moltke realized he did not have sufficient forces to carry out the Schlieffen Plan which envisioned Kluck's 1st Army encircling Paris to the west and south. Instead, he issued a Grand Directive changing the order of battle for the German attack. He ordered that Paris be bypassed on the north. The Germans would now attempt to entrap the French forces between Paris and Verdun. To accomplish this, Bülow's 2nd Army became the primary striking force, with the 1st Army ordered to follow in echelon to protect the western flank of the 2nd. At the time of this Grand Directive, Moltke based his decision on an intercepted radio transmission describing the French retreating across the Marne. Kluck, who was as bold as Bulow was cautious, was not pleased with the change of plans which would require him to halt his advance to wait for Bulow. Instead, interpreting the order broadly (or disobeying it), Kluck turned his line of march from south to southeast, becoming closer but not in echelon with Bülow, and on 3 September his forces crossed the Marne River 60 km (37 miles) east of Paris, the first Germans to do so. Kluck was in pursuit of the French 5th army which was still retreating. Kluck's boldness was based on his confidence that the French and British were a depleted and defeated force. He was unaware that a new French army, the 6th of Joseph Gallieni and Maunoury, was guarding Paris to his west and he discounted the British Expeditionary Force which had apparently abandoned the battlefield.

The French commander Joffre was preparing for the propitious time to counterattack. He reinforced his newly created 6th and 9th Armies. On 3 September Joffre dismissed Lanrezac, commander of the 5th Army, and replaced him with Louis Franchet d'Espèrey. This was done despite the fact Lanrezac had been right, as Joffre had been wrong, about the German offensive coming from Belgium and had also been right in violating the French "cult of the offensive" by taking a defensive posture against the invading Germans and preserving his army to fight another day. The French government fled Paris on 2 September fearing the Germans would conquer the city.

On 4 September, while meeting with the British General Henry Wilson, d'Esperey, the new commander of the French 5th Army, outlined a plan for a French and British counter-attack on the German 1st Army. The counterattack would come from the south by the 5th Army, the west by the BEF, and at the Ourcq River by Gallieni and Manoury's new Sixth Army. Gallieni had come to the same conclusion on 3 September and sent Maunoury and the 6th Army east to find the German's flank. Joffre spent much of the afternoon of 4 September in silent contemplation under an ash tree. At dinner, he received word of d'Esperey's plan for the counterattack. That night he issued commands to halt the French retreat in his Instruction General No. 5 and ordered the counterattack to begin on 6 September. The BEF was under no obligation to follow orders of the French, but Joffre believed British participation to be crucial. Joffre first attempted to use diplomatic channels to convince the British government to apply pressure on BEF commander John French. Then, on 5 September, Joffre journeyed to BEF headquarters for discussions, which ended with him banging his hand dramatically on a table while shouting "Monsieur le Maréchal, the honour of England is at stake!" Following this meeting, French agreed to the operational plan to commence the following day.

== The battle ==
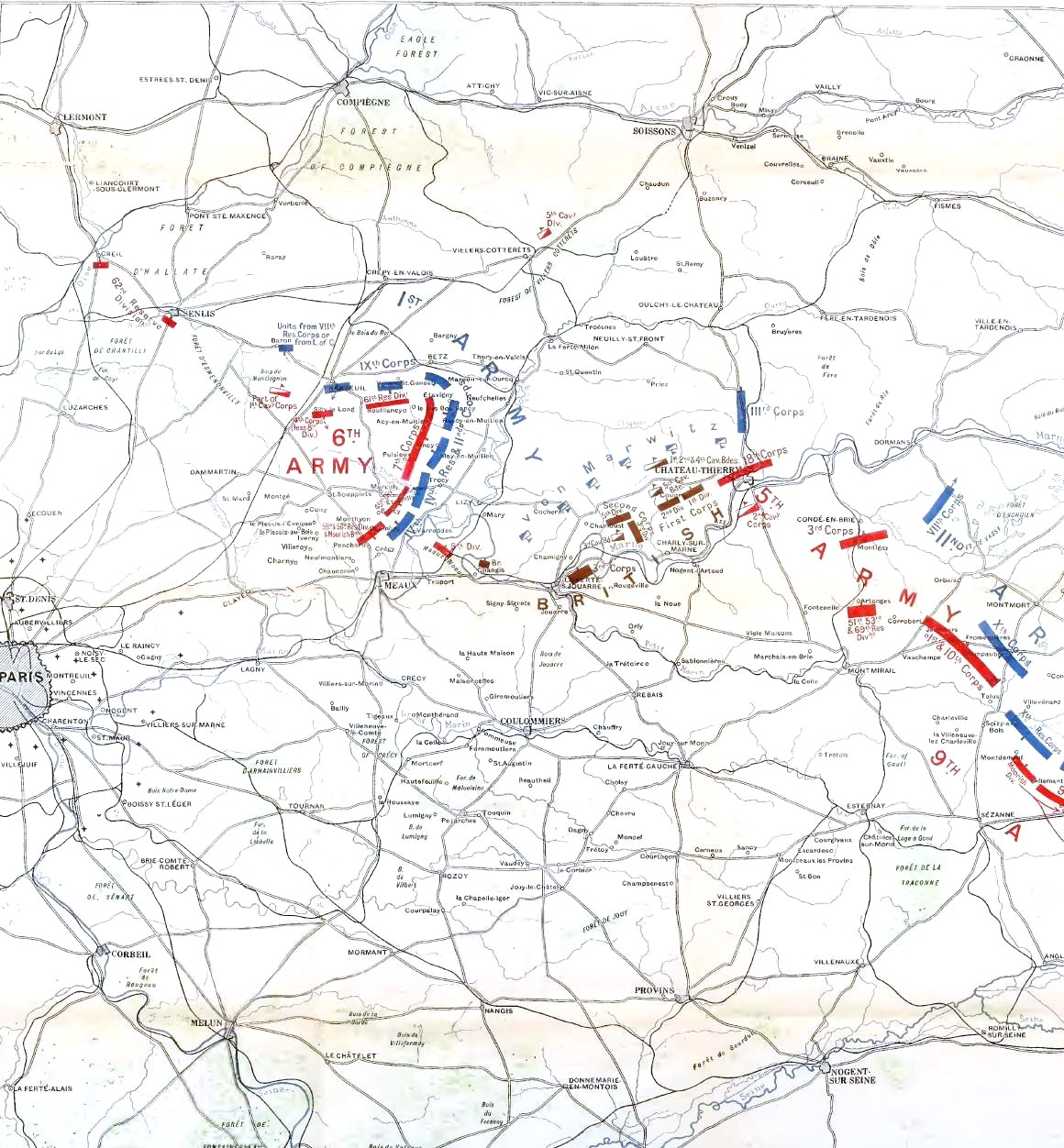
9 September 1914. The BEF (brown) and French 5th army (red) exploit the gap between the German 1st and 2nd armies.

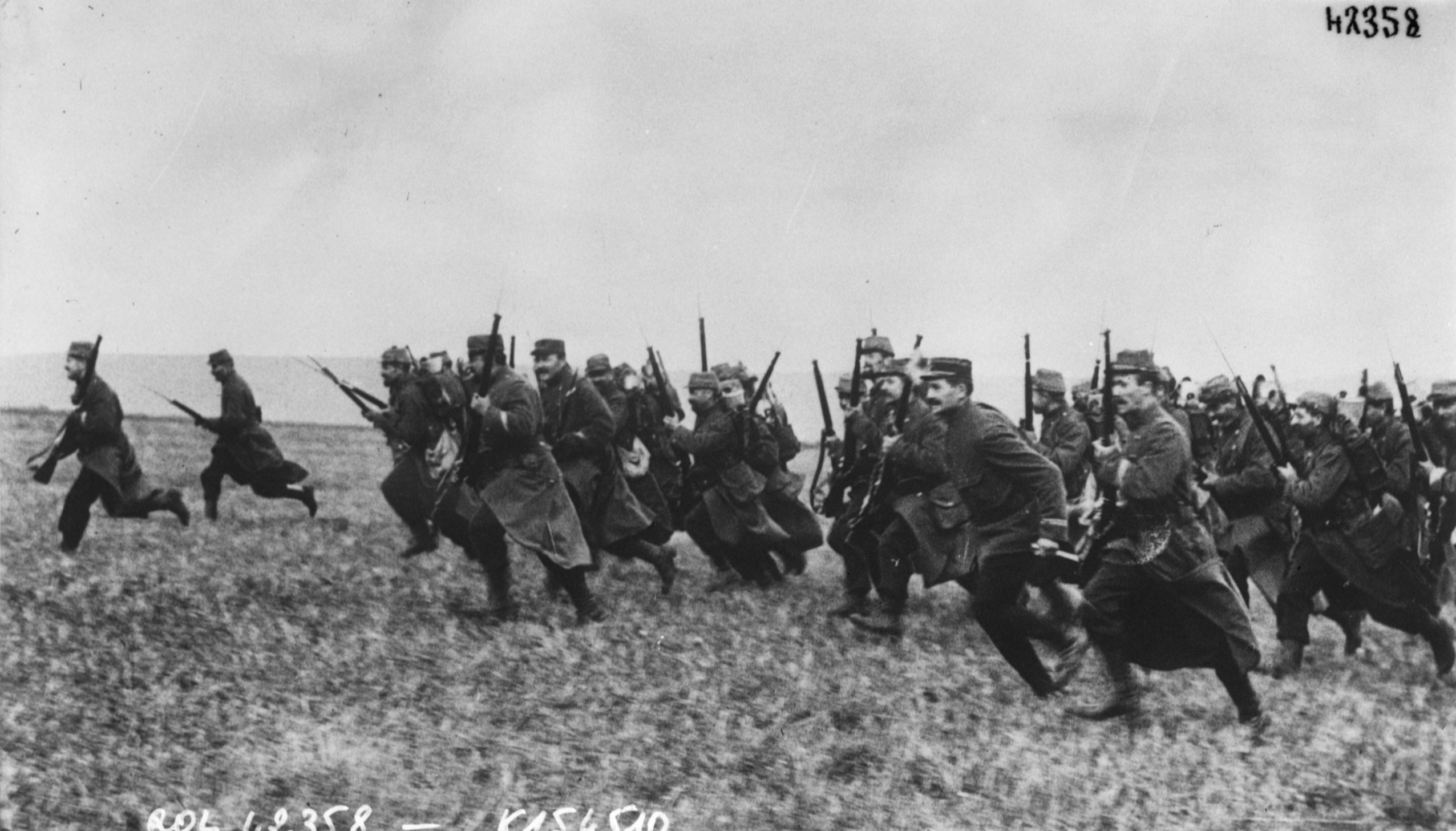
French infantry charge, 1914

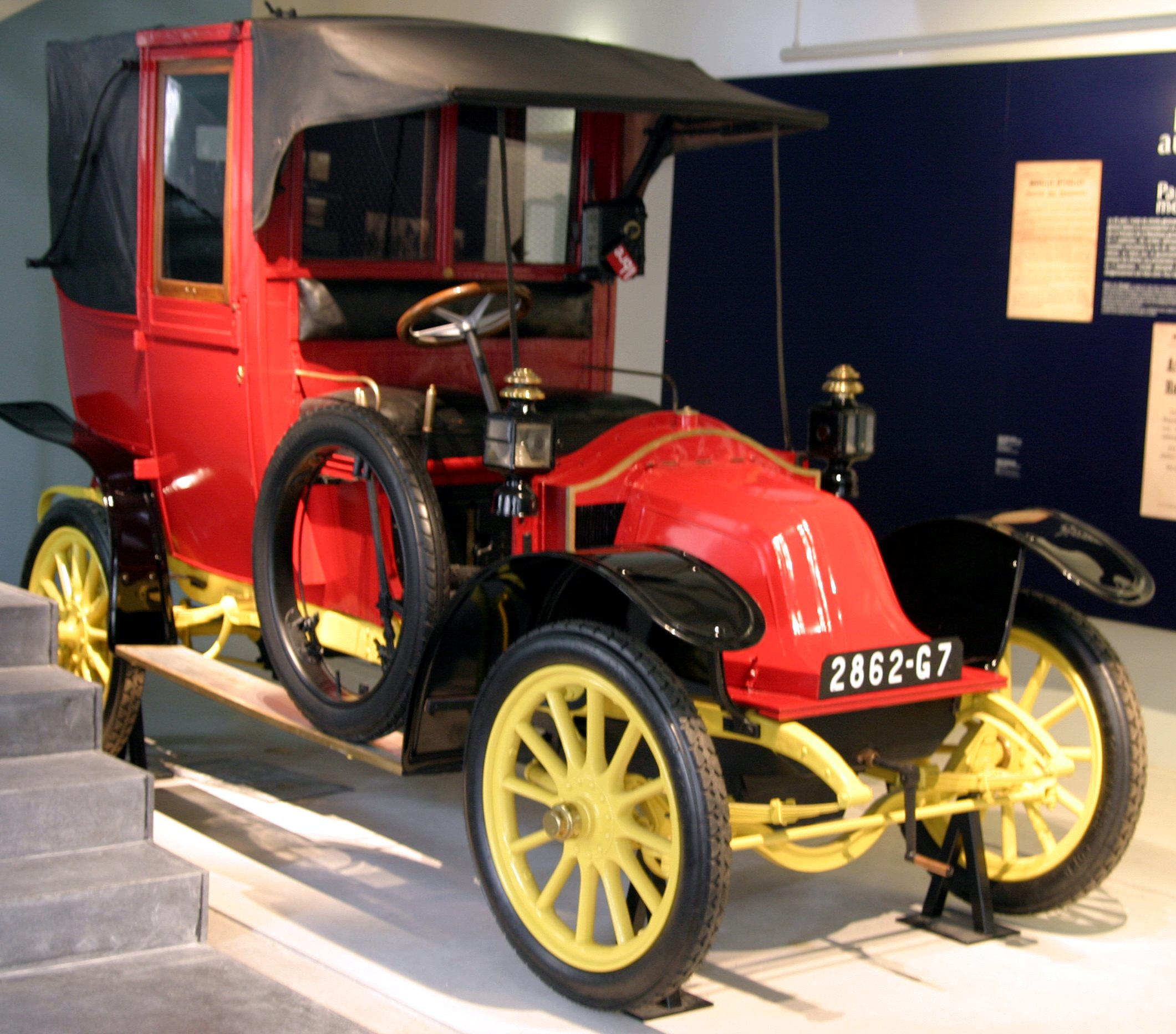
Taxi cab of the Marne

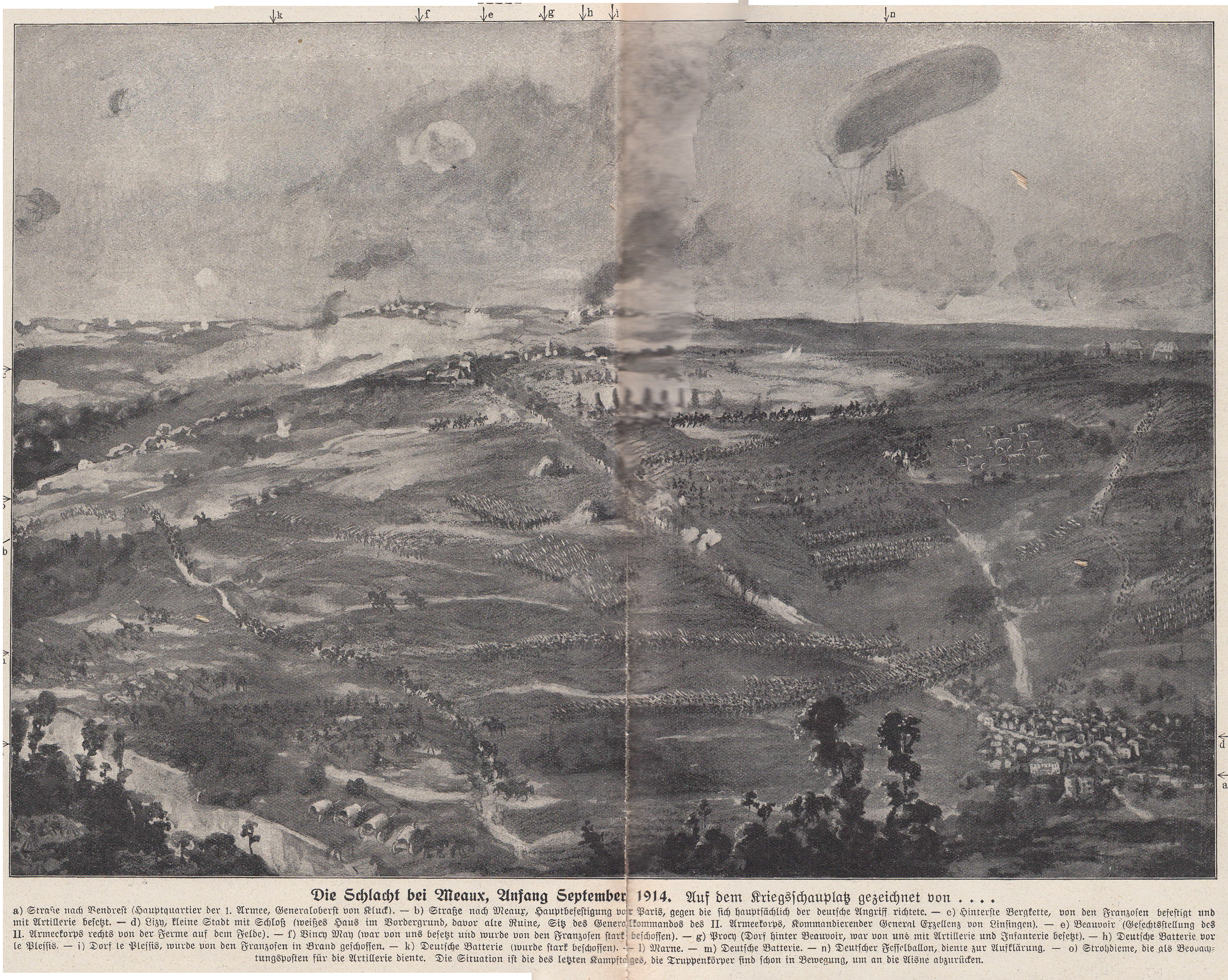
The battle of Meaux September 1914

"At dawn on 6 September, 980,000 French and 100,000 British soldiers with 3,000 guns assaulted the German line of 750,000 men and 3,300 guns between Verdun and Paris." Joffre had finally found the propitious time to end the Great Retreat and counterattack. The battle would take place in two distinct locations near southern tributaries of the Marne with the French 5th and 9th Armies assaulting the German's 2nd and 3rd Armies and north of the Marne between the French 6th Army facing the German 1st Army. Communications and coordination were poor between German armies and with Moltke's headquarters in Luxembourg, and each German army would fight its own battle.

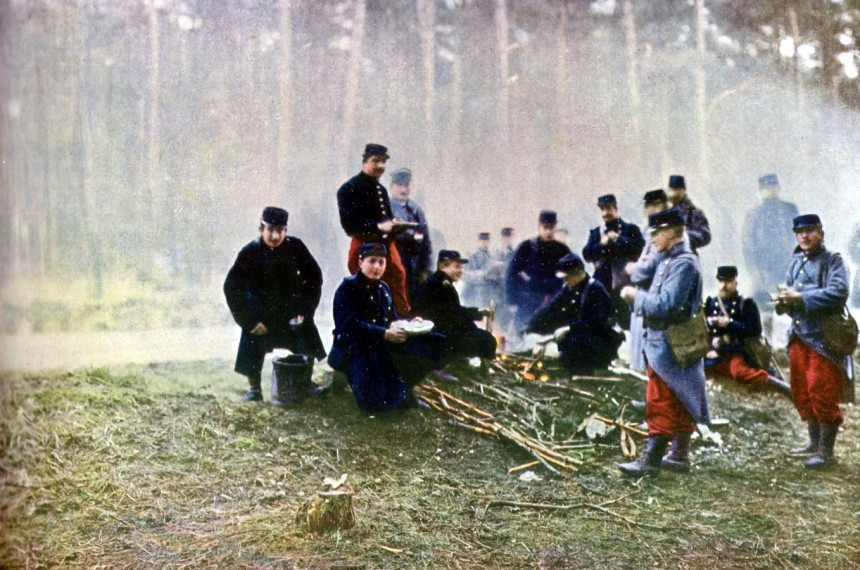
French soldiers rest in a forest during the battle of the Marne. Autochrome colour photograph.

=== Kluck ===
On 5 September, one day before Joffre's plan to begin the French offensive, the French and Germans clashed on Kluck's 1st Army's right flank. Part of Maunoury's 6th Army, made up mostly of reservists and numbering in total 150,000, was probing 40 km (25 miles) northeast from Paris near the Ourcq River looking for the Germans when it encountered the IV Reserve Corps of 24,000 men commanded by German General Hans von Gronau. Gronau had the responsibility of covering Kluck's right flank. He discerned the danger of a flank attack against Kluck and, although greatly outnumbered, attacked the French, holding them off for 24 hours before retreating. Kluck was therefore warned of the unexpected threat to his right flank and indeed his whole army. Kluck chose to mount a counteroffensive. He ordered his army to turn to the right and face west to confront the threat from the French 6th Army. This involved a withdrawal of Kluck's forces which had crossed the Marne River to the south and now had to march 130 km (81 miles) in two days to reach positions facing the French. Kluck's swift reaction prevented the 6th Army from advancing across the Ourcq River to the German rear. Kluck moved off French attacks on 6 and 7 September.

On the night of 7–8 September came the most storied event of the Battle of the Marne. Military Governor Gallieni in Paris reinforced the 6th Army guarding Paris by shuttling soldiers to the front by rail, truck, and Renault taxis. Gallieni commandeered about 600 taxicabs at Les Invalides in central Paris to carry soldiers to the front at Nanteuil-le-Haudouin, 50 kilometres (31 mi) away. Most of the taxis were demobilised on 8 September but some remained longer to transport wounded and refugees. The taxis, following city regulations, dutifully ran their meters. The French treasury paid the total fare of 70,012 francs.

The arrival of 6000 soldiers by rail, truck, and taxi has been described as critical in preventing a possible German breakthrough against the 6th Army. However, in General Gallieni's memoirs, he notes how some had "exaggerated somewhat the importance of the taxis." In 2001, Strachan mentions only the taxis as "fewer than legend" and in 2009 Herwig called the taxis militarily insignificant. The positive impact on French morale was undeniable.

Kluck telegrammed Moltke on the night of 8 September that "The decision will be obtained tomorrow by an enveloping attack by General von Quast." The next morning Quast fought his way through the defences of the French 6th Army and the way to Paris, 50 km (31 miles) distant, was open. In Keegan's words, "The balance of advantage on the Marne once more seemed to have tilted the Germans' way."

=== Bülow and Hausen ===
Bülow's 2nd Army south of the Marne on 6 September was as worn and depleted as Kluck's, having marched 440 km (270 miles) since leaving Germany and having suffered more than 26,000 casualties and soldiers felled by illnesses. Bülow had begun the war with 260,000 soldiers; in September he had 154,000. Moreover, his relations with Kluck were poor.

While Kluck was on the offensive near Paris, Bülow went on the defensive after the French attack on 6 September. On 7 September, Bülow ordered his right wing to retreat 15 km (9.3 miles) to the Petit Morin River after attacks by the French 5th Army of Franchet d'Esperey, called "Desperate Frankie" as a compliment by the British. During the retreat, the French massacred 450 Germans who were attempting to surrender. With his right wing retreating, Bülow conversely ordered his left wing to attack with help from Hausen's 3rd Army. Hausen covered Bülow's left flank and assaulted Foch's 9th Army in the Marshes of Saint–Gond near the city of Sézanne on 8 September. He had 82,000 men for the task. Hausen's attack was a surprise, launched at night with no artillery preparation. His soldiers overran artillery positions "with the bayonet." Hausen pushed Foch back 13 km (8.1 miles). Hausen's attack then bogged down, with his soldiers exhausted and having suffered about 11,000 casualties.

=== The gap ===
Kluck's turn to the northwest on 5 to 7 September to fight the 6th Army opened a 50 km (31 miles) gap on his left flank between his soldiers and those of the 2nd Army. French aerial reconnaissance observed German forces moving north to face the 6th Army and discovered the gap. The lack of coordination between von Kluck and Bülow caused the gap to widen even further.

The Allies exploited the gap in the German lines, sending the BEF northwest toward Kluck and the 5th Army northeast toward Bülow into the gap between the two German armies. The right wing of the French 5th Army attacked on 6 September and pinned the 2nd Army in the Battle of the Two Morins, named for the two rivers in the area, the Grand Morin and Petit Morin. The BEF advanced on 6–8 September, crossed the Petit Morin, captured bridges over the Marne, and established a bridgehead 8 kilometres (5 mi) deep. Despite the promise by BEF commander French to Joffre that he would reenter the battle, the slow pace of the BEF's advance enraged d'Espèrey, commander of the 5th Army, and other French commanders. On 6 September the British force moved so slowly it finished the day 12 kilometres (7 mi) behind its objectives and suffered only seven men killed. The BEF, though outnumbering Germans in the gap ten to one, advanced only 40 km (25 miles) in three days. The 5th Army by 8 September crossed the Petit Morin, which forced Bülow to withdraw the right flank of the 2nd Army. The next day, the 5th Army crossed the Marne, and the German 2nd Army retreated further.

=== Hentsch's tour ===
Moltke, at headquarters in Luxembourg, was out of communication with the German armies in France. He preferred sending instructions to his armies by emissary rather than relying on his inadequate telephone and telegraph system. He sent his intelligence officer, Lieutenant Colonel Richard Hentsch, to visit the armies. Moltke's instructions to Hentsch were verbal, not written, although apparently Moltke gave Hentsch, a mere lieutenant colonel, the authority to order the German armies to retreat if necessary for their survival. Hentsch's mission, in the words of historian Herwig, was to become "the most famous staff tour in military history."

Hentsch departed Luxembourg on 8 September by automobile and visited the 5th, 4th, and 3rd German Armies that afternoon. He reported back to Moltke that the situation of those armies was "entirely favorable." At 6:45 that evening, he received a different message at 2nd Army headquarters in a meeting with Bülow and his staff. Hentsch was told that Bülow's right flank (bordering the gap between Bülow's and Kluck's armies) was at the point of collapse. Bülow said that his army was "cinders" and "in no condition" to take the offensive against the French. He blamed Kluck for the crisis and said that Kluck should immediately break off the battle with the French 6th Army and close the gap between them. If not, the situation could become "extremely serious".

Hentsch apparently responded to Field Marshal Bülow that, he, Hentsch had "full power of authority" to order Kluck to withdraw from his battle with the 6th French Army. During the meeting, Bülow received the news that his army was buckling under pressure from the French. Bülow ordered a 20 km (12 miles) withdrawal of his forces and predicted "incalculable consequences". Hentsch agreed with Bülow that when French and British forces crossed the Marne, a general retreat would be necessary. They agreed that Kluck had to disengage and march to the Marne to link up with Bülow's 2nd Army. If Kluck refused, Bülow would retreat north of the Marne.

The next morning, 9 September, receiving additional bad news from the front, Bülow ordered another withdrawal without knowing what Kluck would do. Meanwhile, Hentsch proceeded to Kluck's 1st Army headquarters near the Ourcq River, arriving at 11:30 am. He met with Kluck's chief of staff, Hermann von Kuhl. Hentsch described Bülow's hazardous position and said a general retreat was necessary, again asserting his authority in the name of Moltke. Kuhl "was thunderstruck." The 1st Army was poised to assault Paris and, hopefully, win the war, but Kuhl acceded to Hentsch and informed Kluck. With Bülow retreating, Kluck had no choice but to follow suit. His order said he was retreating "at the behest" of Moltke's General Staff. On 11 September Moltke himself visited the 3rd, 4th, and 5th Armies and ordered a retreat of those armies (in addition to the ongoing retreat of the 1st and 2nd Armies) to the Aisne River to regroup for another offensive. The Germans were pursued by the French and British, although the pace of the exhausted Allied forces was slow and averaged only 19 km (12 mi) per day. The Germans ceased their retreat after 65 km (40 mi), north of the Aisne River where they dug in, preparing trenches. Joffre ordered Allied troops to pursue, leading to the First Battle of the Aisne (see below).

"Along a front of nearly 250 miles [400km], the German infantry faced about and began to retrace its steps over the ground won in bitter combat during the last two weeks." Many of the German soldiers and officers on the front lines of the conflict were bitter at what they regarded as a foolish order to retreat. Meyer said that the First Battle of the Marne "has come down to us in history as the fight that saved Paris but in fact was settled by one side's decision not to fight."

== Aftermath ==
The German retreat from 9–13 September marked the end of the Schlieffen Plan. Moltke is said to have reported to the Kaiser: "Your Majesty, we have lost the war." (Majestät, wir haben den Krieg verloren).

Whether General von Moltke actually said to the Emperor, "Majesty, we have lost the war," we do not know. We know anyhow that with a prescience greater in political than in military affairs, he wrote to his wife on the night of the 9th, "Things have not gone well. The fighting east of Paris has not gone in our favour, and we shall have to pay for the damage we have done".

On 14 September, the German military authorities informed Kaiser Wilhelm II that "Moltke's nerves are at an end and [he] is no longer able to conduct operations". The Kaiser forced Moltke to resign due to "ill health" and the Reich War Minister, Erich von Falkenhayn, was appointed to replace him.

After the Battle of the Marne, the Germans retreated for up to 90 kilometres (56 mi) and lost 11,717 prisoners, 30 field guns and 100 machine guns to the French and 3,500 prisoners to the British before reaching the Aisne. The German retreat ended their hope of pushing the French beyond the Verdun–Marne–Paris line and winning a quick victory. Following the battle and the failures by both sides to turn the opponent's northern flank during the Race to the Sea, the war of movement ended with the Germans and the Allied powers facing each other across a stationary front line of trenches and defences that remained nearly stable for four years.

=== Analysis ===
At the start of the war, both sides had plans that they hoped would result in victory after a short war. While the German invasion failed to defeat the French and British, after the battle the German army still occupied a large portion of northern France, as well as most of Belgium. "France had lost 64 per cent of its iron, 62 per cent of its steel, and 50 per cent of its coal."

Joffre, whose planning had led to the disastrous Battle of the Frontiers, was able to achieve a tactical victory. He used interior lines to move troops from the right wing to the left wing and sacked many French generals. Due to the redistribution of French troops, the German 1st Army had 128 battalions facing 191 battalions of the French and BEF. The 2nd and 3rd Armies had 134 battalions facing 268 battalions of the 5th and new 9th Armies. It was his orders that prevented Castelnau from abandoning Nancy on 6 September or reinforcing that army when the main battle took place on the other side of the battlefield. He resisted counter-attacking until the time was right, then put his full force behind it. D'Esperey should also receive credit as the author of the main stroke. As Joffre wrote in his memoirs, "it was he who made the Battle of the Marne possible".

Historians call the Battle of the Marne a partial success. John Terraine wrote that "nowhere, and at no time, did it present the traditional aspect of victory" but added that the French and British stroke into the gap between the 1st and 2nd Armies "made the battle of the Marne the decisive battle of the war". Barbara W. Tuchman and Robert A. Doughty wrote that Joffre's victory at the Marne was far from decisive, Tuchman calling it an "...incomplete victory of the Marne..." and Doughty [the] "...opportunity for a decisive victory had slipped from his hands". Ian Sumner called it a flawed victory and that it proved impossible to deal the German armies "a decisive blow". Tuchman wrote that Kluck explained the German failure at the Marne as:

...the reason that transcends all others was the extraordinary and peculiar aptitude of the French soldier to recover quickly. [...] That men will let themselves be killed where they stand, that is well-known and counted on in every plan of battle. But that men who have retreated for ten days, sleeping on the ground and half dead with fatigue, should be able to take up their rifles and attack when the bugle sounds, is a thing upon which we never counted. It was a possibility not studied in our war academy.

Richard Brooks in 2000 wrote that the significance of the battle was that the failure of the German strategy forced Germany to fight a two-front war against France and Russia—the scenario its strategists had long feared. Brooks claimed that, "By frustrating the Schlieffen Plan, Joffre had won the decisive battle of the war, and perhaps of the century". The Battle of the Marne was also one of the first battles in which reconnaissance aircraft played an important role, by discovering weak points in the German lines, which the Entente armies were able to exploit.

=== Casualties ===
It is difficult to separate the casualties in the Battle of the Marne from the casualties in the other related battles of August and September 1914. Over two million men fought in the campaign leading to the First Battle of the Marne and although there are no exact official casualty counts for the battle, estimates for the actions of September along the Marne front for all armies are often given as c. 500,000 killed or wounded. French casualties totalled c. 250,000 men, of whom an estimated 80,000 were killed. Tuchman gave French casualties for August as 206,515 from Armées Françaises and Herwig gave French casualties for September as 213,445, also from Armées Françaises for a total of just under 420,000 in the first two months of the war. According to Roger Chickering, German casualties for the 1914 campaigns on the Western Front were 500,000. British casualties were 13,000 men, with 1,700 killed. No future battle on the Western Front would average so many casualties per day.

In 2009, Herwig re-estimated the casualties for the battle. He wrote that the French official history, Les armées françaises dans la grande guerre, gave 213,445 French casualties in September and assumed that c. 40% occurred during the Battle of the Marne. Using the German Sanitätsberichte, Herwig recorded that from 1 to 10 September, the 1st Army suffered 13,254 casualties, the 2nd Army 10,607, the 3rd Army 14,987, the 4th Army 9,433, the 5th Army 19,434, the 6th Army 21,200 and the 7th Army 10,164. Herwig estimated that the five German armies from Verdun to Paris suffered 67,700 casualties during the battle and also assumed 85,000 casualties for the French. Herwig wrote that there were 1,701 British casualties (the British Official History noted that these losses were incurred from 6 to 10 September). Herwig estimated 300,000 casualties for all sides at the Marne but questioned whether isolating the battle was justified. Sergey Nelipovich, using the same type of sources for the Germans, estimated their casualties as 10,602 killed, 16,815 missing and 47,432 wounded. He also estimated the losses of the Entente forces at about 268,500, including 45,000 killed, 173,000 wounded and 50,500 prisoners. In 2010, Ian Sumner wrote that there were 12,733 British casualties, including 1,700 dead. Sumner cites the same casualty figure for the French for September as Herwig from Armées Françaises, which includes the losses at the battle of the Aisne, as 213,445, 18,073 killed, 111,963 wounded and 83,409 missing. Most of the missing had been killed.

=== Subsequent operations ===
==== First Battle of the Aisne, 13–28 September ====
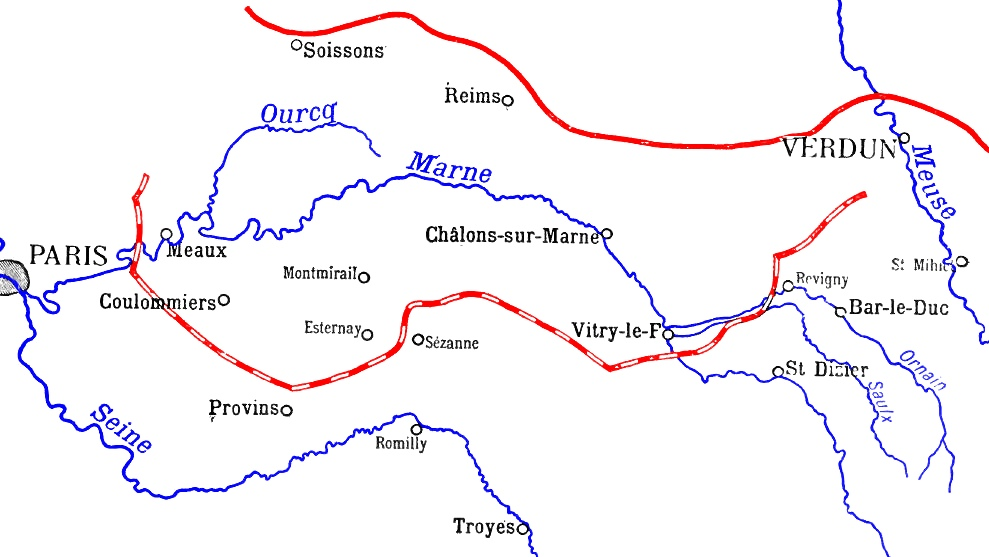
Opposing positions: 5 September (dashed line) 13 September (solid line)

On 10 September, Joffre ordered the French armies and the BEF to advance and for four days, the armies on the left flank moved forward and captured German stragglers, wounded and equipment, opposed only by rearguards. On 11 and 12 September, Joffre ordered outflanking manoeuvres by the armies on the left flank but the advance was too slow to catch the Germans, who ended their withdrawal on 14 September on high ground on the north bank of the Aisne and began to dig in. Frontal attacks by the 9th, 5th, and 6th Armies were repulsed from 15–16 September. This led Joffre to transfer the 2nd Army west to the left flank of the 6th Army, the first phase of Entente attempts to outflank the German armies in "the Race to the Sea".

French troops had begun to move westwards on 2 September, using the undamaged railways behind the front, which were able to move a corps to the left flank in 5–6 days. On 17 September, the French 6th Army attacked from Soissons to Noyon, at the westernmost point of the French flank, with the XIII and IV Corps, supported by the 61st and 62nd Divisions of the 6th Group of Reserve Divisions. After this, the fighting moved north to Lassigny, and the French dug in around Nampcel.

The French 2nd Army completed the move from Lorraine and took over command of the left-hand corps of the Sixth Army, as indications appeared that German troops were also being moved from the eastern flank. The German IX Reserve Corps arrived from Belgium by 15 September and the next day joined the 1st Army for an attack to the south-west, with IV Corps and the 4th and 7th Cavalry Divisions, against the attempted French envelopment. The attack was cancelled and the IX Reserve Corps was ordered to withdraw behind the right flank of the 1st Army. The 2nd and 9th Cavalry Divisions were dispatched as reinforcements the next day but before the retirement began, the French attack reached Carlepont and Noyon, before being contained on 18 September. The German armies attacked from Verdun westwards to Reims and the Aisne at the Battle of Flirey (19 September – 11 October), cut the main railway from Verdun to Paris and created the St. Mihiel salient, south of the Verdun fortress zone. The main German effort remained on the western flank, which was revealed to the French by intercepted wireless messages. By 28 September, the Aisne front had stabilised and the BEF began to withdraw on the night of 1/2 October, with the first troops arriving in the Abbeville on the Somme on the night of 8/9 October. The BEF prepared to commence operations in French Flanders and Flanders in Belgium, joining with the British forces that had been in Belgium since August.

==== Race to the Sea ====
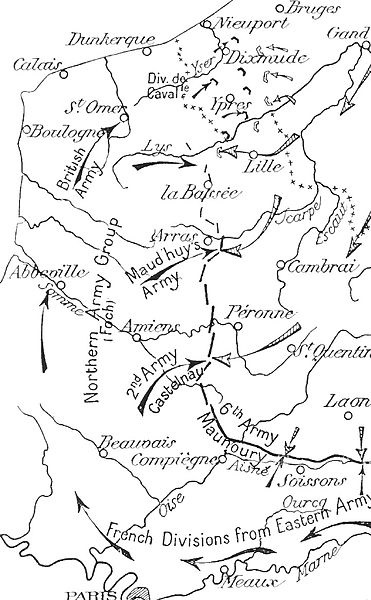
German and Allied operations, Artois and Flanders, September–November 1914

From 17 September – 17 October the belligerents attempted to turn each other's northern flank. Joffre ordered the French 2nd Army to move to the north of the French 6th Army, by moving from eastern France from 2–9 September. Falkenhayn, who had replaced Moltke on 14 September, ordered the German 6th Army to move from the German-French border to the northern flank on 17 September. By the next day, French attacks north of the Aisne led Falkenhayn to order the 6th Army to repulse the French and secure the flank. The French advance at the First Battle of Picardy (22–26 September) met a German attack rather than an open flank and by the end of the Battle of Albert (25–29 September), the 2nd Army had been reinforced to eight corps but was still opposed by German forces at the Battle of Arras (1–4 October), rather than advancing around the German northern flank. The German 6th Army had also found that on arrival in the north, it was forced to oppose the French attack rather than advance around the flank and that the secondary objective, to protect the northern flank of the German armies in France, had become the main task. By 6 October, the French needed British reinforcements to withstand German attacks around Lille. The BEF had begun to move from the Aisne to Flanders on 5 October and reinforcements from England assembled on the left flank of the 10th Army, which had been formed from the left flank units of the 2nd Army on 4 October.

Both the Entente and the Germans attempted to take more ground after the "open" northern flank had disappeared. The Franco-British attacks towards Lille in October at the battles of La Bassée, Messines and Armentières (October–November) were followed up by attempts to advance between the BEF and the Belgian army by a new French 8th Army. The moves of the 7th and then the 6th Army from Alsace and Lorraine had been intended to secure German lines of communication through Belgium, where the Belgian army had sortied several times, during the period between the Great Retreat and the Battle of the Marne; in August, British marines had landed at Dunkirk. In October, a new German 4th Army was assembled from the III Reserve Corps, the siege artillery used against Antwerp, and four of the new reserve corps training in Germany. A German offensive began by 21 October but the 4th and 6th Armies were only able to take a small amount of ground, at great cost to both sides at the Battle of the Yser (16–31 October) and further south in the First Battle of Ypres (19 October – 22 November). Falkenhayn then attempted to achieve the limited goal of capturing Ypres and Mont Kemmel.

== See also ==
- Order of battle of the First Battle of the Marne
- World War I casualties
- La Ferté-sous-Jouarre memorial
- La Délivrance
- Second Battle of the Marne

== Bibliography ==
- Asprey, R. B. (1962). The First Battle of the Marne. London: Weidenfeld & Nicolson. OCLC 752821273.
- Blond, Georges (1967). The Marne (translation by H.E. Hart, of La Marne ed.). New York: Pyramid Books. OCLC 559095779.
- Boucard, Pauline (2013). Dictionnaire historique de Paris. La Pochothèque. ISBN 978-2-253-13140-3.
- Battle-Fields of the Marne 1914. Illustrated Michelin Guides for the Visit to the Battlefields. Clermont-Ferrand: Michelin & Cie. 1925. OCLC 487790576.
- Brooks, Richard (2000). Atlas of World Military History. London: HarperCollins. ISBN 0-7607-2025-8.
- Cassar, G. (2004). Kitchener's War: British Strategy from 1914–1916. Washington DC: Brassey's. ISBN 1-57488-708-4.
- Chickering, R. (2004). Imperial Germany and the Great War, 1914–1918. Cambridge University Press. ISBN 978-1-10703-768-7.
- Churchill, Winston (2005). The world crisis 1911-1918. Free Press. ISBN 0743283430.
- Nelipovich, Sergei G. (2023). Два похода. Борьба за Восточную Пруссию в августе-октябре 1914 [Two campaigns. The Struggle for East Prussia in August-October 1914]. Забытые войны России (in Russian). Moscow: Квадрига. ISBN 978-5-91791-376-6.
- Clodfelter, M. (2017). Warfare and Armed Conflicts: A Statistical Encyclopedia of Casualty and Other Figures, 1492–2015 (4th ed.). Jefferson, North Carolina: McFarland. ISBN 978-0-7864-7470-7.
- Doughty, R. A. (2005). Pyrrhic Victory: French Strategy and Operations in the Great War. Cambridge, MA: Belknap Press. ISBN 0-67401-880-X.
- Dupuy, R. E.; Dupuy, T. N. (1970). The Encyclopedia of Military History. New York: Harper & Row. ISBN 0-06-011139-9.
- Dupuy, T. N. (1977). A Genius for War: The German Army and General Staff, 1807–1945. Englewood Cliffs, N.J.: Prentice-Hall. ISBN 0-13-351114-6.
- Edmonds, J. E. (1926). Military Operations France and Belgium 1914: Mons, the Retreat to the Seine, the Marne and the Aisne August–October 1914. History of the Great War Based on Official Documents by Direction of the Historical Section of the Committee of Imperial Defence. Vol. I (2nd ed.). London: Macmillan. OCLC 58962523.
- Evans, M. M. (2004). Battles of World War I. Devizes: Select Editions. ISBN 1-84193-226-4.
- Gardner, Nikolas (2003). Trial by Fire: Command and the British Expeditionary Force in 1914. London: Greenwood Press. ISBN 978-0-313-32473-4.
- Terraine, John (1991). Mons: The Retreat to Victory. London: Leo Cooper. ISBN 9780850522273.
- Fierro, Alfred (1996). Histoire et Dictionnaire de Paris. Robert Laffont. ISBN 2-221-07862-4.
- Foley, R. T. (2005). German Strategy and the Path to Verdun : Erich Von Falkenhayn and the Development of Attrition, 1870–1916. Cambridge: CUP. ISBN 978-0-521-04436-3.
- Herwig, H. (2009). The Marne, 1914: The Opening of World War I and the Battle that Changed the World. New York: Random House. ISBN 978-1-4000-6671-1.
- Isselin, H. (1964). The Battle of the Marne (Elek Books 1965, translation of La Bataille de la Marne ed.). Paris: Editions B. Arthaud. OCLC 760592610.
- Keegan, John (1998). The First World war. New York: Alfred A. Knopf. ISBN 0375400524.
- Mead, P. (1983). The Eye in the Air. London: HMSO. ISBN 0-11-771224-8.
- Meyer, G.J. (2007). A World Undone: The Story of the Great War, 1914–1918. New York: Bantam Dell. ISBN 978-0-553-38240-2.
- Mom, Gijs (2014). Atlantic Automobilism: Emergence and Persistence of the Car, 1895–1940. Berghahn Books. ISBN 978-1-7823-8378-9.
- Mombauer, Annika (December 2006). "The Battle of the Marne: Myths and Reality of Germany's 'Fateful Battle'". The Historian. 68 (4): 747–769. doi:10.1111/j.1540-6563.2006.00166.x.
- Perris, G. H. (1920). The Battle of the Marne. London: Methuen. OCLC 565300967.
- Porch, D. (1981). The March to the Marne: The French Army, 1870–1914 (2003 ed.). Cambridge: CUP. ISBN 0-52154-592-7.
- Senior, I. (2012). Home before the leaves fall: A New History of the German Invasion of 1914. Oxford: Osprey. ISBN 978-1-84908-843-5.
- Schüddekopf, O. E. (1977). Der Erste Weltkrieg. Gütersloh: Bertelsmann Lexikon-Verlag. ISBN 3-57005-021-1.
- Skinner, H. T.; Stacke, H. Fitz M. (1922). Principal Events 1914–1918. History of the Great War Based on Official Documents. London: HMSO. OCLC 17673086.
- Spears, E. (1998). Liaison 1914. London: Eyre & Spottiswoode. ISBN 0-304-35228-4.
- Strachan, H. (2001). To Arms. The First World War. Vol. 1. Oxford: OUP. ISBN 978-0-19-926191-8.
- Sumner, I. (2010). The First Battle of the Marne 1914: The French 'miracle' halts the Germans. Campaign. Oxford: Osprey. ISBN 978-1-84603-502-9.
- Tuchman, B. (1962). The Guns of August. London: Constable.
- Tyng, S. (2007). The Campaign of the Marne 1914. New York: Westholme Publishing. ISBN 978-1-59416-042-4.
