= Renault Taxi de la Marne =

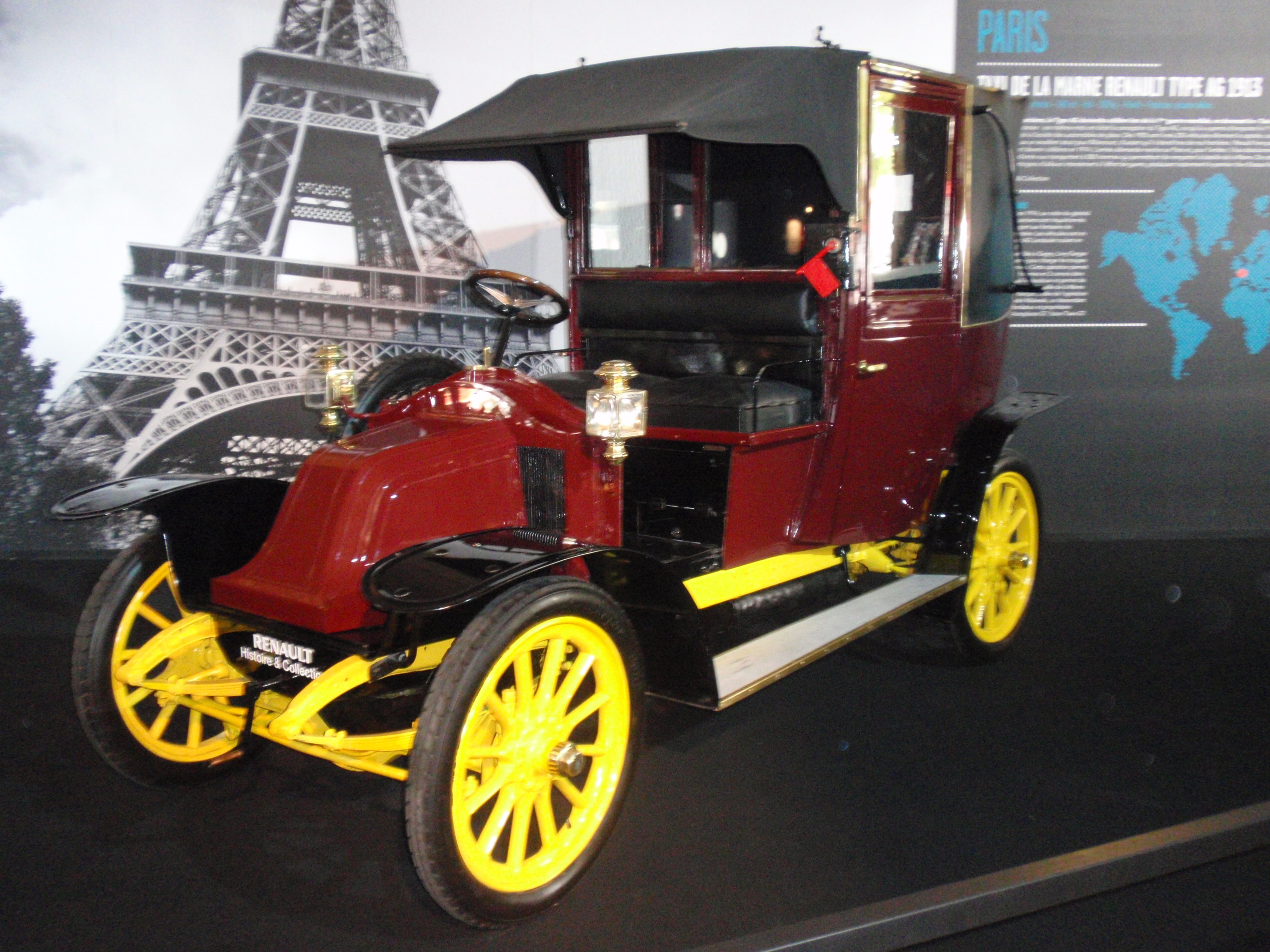

Overview
- Manufacturer: Renault
- Also called: Renault Type AG; Renault Type AG-1; Renault Marne Taxi
- Production: 1905–1910
- Designer: Louis Renault

Body and chassis
- Class: 2-door taxi cab
- Body style: 4-door sedan
- Layout: FR layout

Powertrain
- Engine: I2, 1205 cc, 8 CV
- Transmission: Manual

The Renault Type AG, commonly referred to as the Renault Taxi de la Marne or Marne Taxi is a hackney carriage automobile manufactured by the French automaker Renault from 1905 to 1910. The name Taxi de la Marne was not used until the outbreak of World War I, when the fleet of Paris taxis was requisitioned by the French Army to transport troops from Paris to the First Battle of the Marne in early September 1914. It was also the first taxi manufactured by Renault.

== Production and sales ==
It was the first car produced after Marcel Renault's death in 1903, along with another four models. The vehicle was produced in Renault's 22,000-square-metre (240,000 sq ft) assembly plant in Billancourt.

A car-rental company in Paris ordered 1,500 cars in 1905 as a result of a recent invention that automatically calculated how much the passenger had to pay, the taximeter. By 1907, Renault had sold over 3,000 Type AGs, with exports to Argentina, the United Kingdom, and the United States. Approximately 1,100 vehicles were shipped to London to serve as taxi cabs.

== First Battle of the Marne ==
Prior to the start of the war, Paris had over 10,000 taxis. However with the onset of World War I, only 3,000 taxis were still in service in Paris by September 1914; typically driven by chauffeurs aged 55 to 65. Many of these taxis were Renault Type-AGs, owned by the G7 taxi company; and as a result, gained the attention of the public for its role in transporting soldiers to the First Battle of the Marne from 6 September to 8 September.

During the battle, the French Army's 62nd Division arrived at a railway station outside Paris, a significant distance away from the main battle. The French Army estimated it needed approximately 1,200 taxis to transport the 6,000 man division to the battle, resulting in the National Gendarmerie searching for taxis throughout Paris, and the village of Gagny. On 6 September 1914, General Gallieni gathered about six hundred taxicabs at Les Invalides in central Paris to carry soldiers to the front at Nanteuil-le-Haudouin, fifty kilometres away. In the night of 6-7, two groups set off: the first, comprising 350 vehicles, departed at 10 PM, and another of 250 an hour later. Each taxi carried five soldiers, four in the back and one next to the driver. Only the back lights of the taxis were lit; the drivers were instructed to follow the lights of the taxi ahead. The chauffeurs were willing to provide their services to the French Army due to the promise of reimbursement for distance travelled, which resulted in races between taxi cab drivers to reach the collection points, as well as a traffic jam at the collection points themselves. Most of the taxis were demobilised on 8 September but some remained longer to carry the wounded and refugees. The taxis, following city regulations, dutifully ran their meters. The French treasury reimbursed the total fare of 70,012 francs. In total, taxis helped transport approximately 4,000 men, or five battalions to the battle.

Although the Marne taxis were used to transport members of the 62nd Division, its public prominence was largely due to the improvised nature of the effort. Analysis of the battle typically view the role of the taxis' as marginal in the overall course of the battle; as the bulk of the 150,000 soldiers in the French 6th Army had already been brought to the battle earlier by train. However, reports on the Marne taxis had a real effect in boosting the morale of French Army, and its civilian populations.

== Sources ==
- Boucard, Pauline (2013). Dictionnaire historique de Paris. La Pochothèque. ISBN 978-2-253-13140-3.
- Fierro, Alfred (1996). Histoire et Dictionnaire de Paris. Robert Laffont. ISBN 2-221-07862-4.
- Mom, Gijs (2014). Atlantic Automobilism: Emergence and Persistence of the Car, 1895-1940. Berghahn Books. ISBN 978-1-7823-8378-9.
- Tyng, Sewell (2007) [1st edition published 1935 by Longmans, Green and Company]. The Campaign of the Marne 1914 (2nd ed.). New York: Westholme Publishing. ISBN 1-59416-042-2.
