= AMS =

AMS or Ams may refer to:

== Organizations ==
=== Companies ===
- Alenia Marconi Systems
- American Management Systems
- Advanced Music Systems
- ams AG, semiconductor manufacturer
- AMS Pictures
- Auxiliary Medical Services
- Amadeus IT Group (BMAD stock ticker symbol)

=== Educational institutions ===
- Arthur Morgan School, North Carolina, US
- Army Medical School, US
- People's Liberation Army Academy of Military Sciences
- Academy of Military Science (United States)
- Association of Muslim Schools, global
- Antwerp Management School

=== Government agencies ===
- Agricultural Marketing Service, US
- Army Map Service, US, later National Geospatial-Intelligence Agency
- Army Medical Services, UK

=== Societies and associations ===
- Alma Mater Society of Queen's University, student society, Canada
- Alma Mater Society of the University of British Columbia, student society, Canada
- American Mathematical Society
- American Meteor Society
- American Meteorological Society
- American Montessori Society
- American Musicological Society
- The Ancient Monuments Society, England and Wales
- Association of Muslim Scholars

=== Other ===
- Aboriginal Medical Service, an Indigenous Australian community-controlled health service in Sydney

== Science and technology ==
=== Chemical substances ===
- Sodium 2-anthraquinonesulfonate known as AMS
- Ammonium sulfate, sometimes abbreviated as AMS
- Allyl methyl sulfide
- Alpha-methylstyrene, a chemical intermediate
- Ammonium sulfamate, an herbicide

=== Chemistry and physics ===
- Accelerator mass spectrometry
- AMS radiocarbon dating
- Aerosol mass spectrometry
- Alpha Magnetic Spectrometer, AMS-02
- Anisotropy of magnetic susceptibility

=== Medicine ===
- Acute mountain sickness, a form of altitude sickness
- Acute muscle soreness
- Altered Mental Status; see Altered level of consciousness
- Antimicrobial stewardship
- Ablepharon macrostomia syndrome, an autosomal dominant genetic disorder

=== Software ===
- Address Management System of the US Postal Service
- Access Method Services

=== Technology ===
- Analog and mixed-signal, as in Verilog-AMS and VHDL-AMS
- Anti Missile Systems in missile defense
- Automatic milking systems in dairy farming

== Other uses ==
- Acquisition Management System issued by the US Federal Aviation Administration
- Additional Member System of voting
- Alan Michael Sugar, British businessman, uses initials for enterprises such as Amstrad
- Amsterdam Airport Schiphol (IATA airport code)
- Arbeitsmarktservice, an Austrian employment agency
- Atlanta Motor Speedway
- Auto, Motor und Sport, a German automobile magazine
- Faller Auto Motor Sport, a type of slot cars made by Faller
- Ocean minesweeper (AMS), a US Navy hull classification symbol
- American Samoa (UNDP code "AMS")
- AMS, group of characters in The House of the Dead (series)
- Amsterdam (Amtrak station) in New York (Amtrak station code "AMS")
- Automatic Material System, a proprietary accessory for Bambu Lab 3D printers
