= A.M. (automobile) =

Ateliers Veuve A. de Mesmay
- Industry: Engines; Automobiles; Tractors
- Founded: 1898
- Founder: Adolphe de Mesmay
- Defunct: 1936
- Headquarters: Saint-Quentin, Aisne, France
- Number of employees: 40 (1924)

The A.M. was a range of automobiles manufactured by the French firm of Ateliers Veuve A. de Mesmay. The vehicles were produced in Saint-Quentin, Aisne, France, from 1906 to 1914 and marketed under the name Automobiles Abeille de Mesmay (hence the AM nomenclature). They were powered by petrol engines of various sizes made by the de Mesmay firm, all marketed under the Abeille ("Bee") trade name. The same engines and chassis were used in the AML and AMC range of commercial vehicles.

The company was run by Amélie de Mesmay (née Belin), the widow of Adolphe de Mesmay, who had started manufacturing his Abeille marine petrol engine in 1898.

The de Mesmay company also manufactured light agricultural tractors from 1911 to 1914; they also sold marine and stationary engines in 1-, 2-, and 4-cylinder configurations. Vehicle production ceased at the beginning of World War I. The firm continued to manufacture proprietary engines after the war, and closed in 1936.

== History ==
=== 'Abeille' engines ===
Adolphe de Mesmay was an engineer who had previously worked for the fr:Société française de constructions mécaniques in Saint-Quentin. He built a factory in 1898 on the Quai Gayant (a quay on the Canal de Saint-Quentin) to manufacture his 'Abeille' marine engine. His wife Amélie (née Belin) collaborated with him in running the business. The 'Abeille' trade mark was registered in 1899; the Abeille engines were originally conceived as marine engines, and fitted to competition-winning motor boats.

The de Mesmay firm developed a number of 'Abeille' engines of different capacities. The two and four-cylinder engines were described (in French) in 1901 by the journal La Locomotion. 'Abeille' engines were fitted in cars by other makers, such as the Rocourt-Merlin of Marseille of 1901 and the 2-cylinder Brush car of 1902.

=== Car and truck manufacture ===
Adolphe de Mesmay died in May 1903; the business was carried on by his widow Amélie and reconstructed as Ateliers Mme Veuve A. de Mesmay, with Louis Demilly as director. From circa 1906 the Ateliers V^{ve} A. de Mesmay company fitted 'Abeille' engines to a chassis; advertised as Automobiles 'Abeille' de Mesmay, these were sold as complete automobiles, or as rolling chassis to be finished by other body-makers. In 1906, they were reported as offering for sale two 4-cylinder models producing 12 and 20 hp, as well as a 2-cylinder, 12 hp car. Abeille also manufactured a carburettor in circa 1909, similar to a Daimler device. The factory was expanded in 1908–1911 to include three sites in Saint-Quentin.

Catalogues dating from c1910-1914 shows that the company made 4-cylinder automotive engines in five different sizes, fitted to 'Abeille' de Mesmay (AM) automobiles (models AM 1–5), vans (AML I-III) and trucks (AMC I-II). These were sold as chassis or as complete vehicles. The cylinders of the two smaller engines were cast as monoblocs, the larger three had separate cylinders. Abeilles were available with different bodies ranging from 2-seater runabouts to Landaulettes, limousines and Double-Phaetons.

'Abeille' marine engines were available in 1-, 2-, and various 4-cylinder configurations. The 4-cylinder T-5 of about 30 hp was chosen by the French Navy to power armed patrol boats for export to a foreign navy.

At the Paris General Agricultural Exhibition in 1910, the firm exhibited a motor powered by naphthalene. Granules of naphthalene were heated to a liquid state (around 79°C) by a pipe through which the hot exhaust gas was drawn. The liquid was forced by a small pump into the carburettor. The calorific value of naphthalene is about 8,765 calories/kg (36.6 MJ/kg) compared to normal gasoline, which is approx. 11,400 cal/kg (44.8 MJ/kg).

From 1911 the de Mesmay company also used the 'Abeille' engine to power a four-wheel drive light agricultural tractor, the 'Tracteur FT'. With a plough permanently fitted underneath, between the front and rear wheels and weighing about 1,050 kg, it was sold as the 'Houe-tracteur'.

The de Mesmay firm sold 'Abeille' engines in various configurations such as stationary engines and generator sets for lighting and cinemas (in 1913 the factory installed a 4-cylinder Abeille 25-30 hp engine coupled to a Jacquet dynamo (60 A - 150 V) to power the electric lighting), as well as making gas engines sold under the name Moteurs A. de Mesmay. Production of vehicles ceased on 26 August 1914 soon after the outbreak of war. Total annual production of Abeille engines up to 1914 is estimated at 215 units. The enterprise employed 20 to 30 workers in 1900, 80 to 90 in 1914, and around 40 in 1924.

=== First World War ===
The town of Saint-Quentin was overrun by the German Army in September 1914, and the factory was taken over as an extension of Krupp to repair guns and machine guns, and also to make barbed wire. When the town became the centre of fighting in 1916 the Germans expelled the populace and systematically stripped the town of industrial equipment.

=== Post-war ===
Mesmay's widow Amélie restarted partial engine production after the war in Mantes-la-Jolie, a western suburb of Paris, and returned to the newly built factories in Saint-Quentin in 1920. She died in May 1922, succeeded in business by her legal heir François Thellier. Ateliers Veuve A. de Mesmay continued to make 'Abeille' marine engines into the 1930s and finally closed in 1936. In 1949 the workshops were integrated into the business of a foundry and tap maker, Maumaire Dubua et Cie. The site closed in the 1990s.

== Engines and applications ==
This table contains an incomplete list of 'Abeille' engines; the firm made a wide range of 1, 2, and 4-cylinder engines in both separate and monobloc configurations and with different cylinder dimensions.

Model range c.1910 of Automobiles 'Abeille' de Mesmay (AM)
Bore x stroke (mm)	Power (hp)	Auto model	Commercial model	Marine model
70 x 106	8/11	AM 1	AML-I	Monobloc I-IV
82 x 110	10/14	AM 2	AML-II	Monobloc J-IV
90 x 130	14/18	AM 3	AML-III	
100 x 130	18/24	AM 4	AMC-I	F-IV?
112 x 130	24/30	AM 5	AMC-II	
112 x 140	?			Monobloc T-5

A 40 hp Abeille engine was used to power a Renard Road Train exhibited at the 1908 Franco-British Exhibition, White City, London. A second train was used to carry passengers for pleasure around the ground for 6d. (2 1/2p, 12 cents) (Note: "Motors and Machinery at Shepherd's Bush". Commercial Motor: 3. 25 June 1908. NB The name of the engine is misreported as a 'Beille' engine.) The Technical Director of the French Société des Trains Renard was Frédéric Airault who, like Adolphe de Mesmay, had worked at the fr:Société française de constructions mécaniques, also based in Saint-Quentin. Airault had previously worked at the firm of Anciennes usines Buchet in Levallois, a north western Paris suburb. The Filtz motor company was also based there, whose 72 hp engine was also used in the Renard train.

== Disambiguation ==
Abeille was also the name of a horse-drawn hire cab firm in Paris; before the introduction of the Renault Taxi de la Marne of 1904, Abeille were among the biggest cab companies along with the Compagnie Générale des Voitures, and Urbaine.
