= Andy Moor =

Andy Moor may refer to:

- Andy Moor (guitarist) (born 1962), guitarist of the Ex
- Andy Moor (producer) (born 1980), producer and DJ

== See also ==
- Andrew Moore (disambiguation)
- Moor (disambiguation)
