= Postal address verification =

Process to check the validity of physical mailing addresses

Postal address verification (also known as address, address validation, address verification and CASS certification) is the process used to check the validity and deliverability of a physical mailing address. According to the United States Postal Service, an address is valid (or mailable) if it is CASS-certified, meaning that it exists within the comprehensive list of mailable addresses in their Address Management System. This is different from the credit card Address Verification System (AVS), which is the method used by credit card processors to authenticate ownership of a credit card by verifying that the account on the credit card matches the billing address on file. Credit card AVS does not determine deliverability of an address.

== Standardization ==
Before an address can be certified as deliverable (CASS-certified), it must first be standardized. Standardization converts an address into a standard format by correcting the address, if possible, and adding missing information, such as a ZIP code, to produce a complete address containing a street address, city, state, and ZIP code.

The following methods are used to achieve the most accurate address possible:

=== Abbreviation ===
USPS approved abbreviations are used whenever possible to clarify and shorten the address.

- Example: The term avenue may commonly be abbreviated AV, AVEN, or AVN or fully spelled out as avenue. The standardized form is AVE. Similarly, Square is commonly abbreviated SQRE, SQR, or SQU, while the standardized form is "SQ".

=== Spelling correction ===
Because a misspelling usually results in an undeliverable address, commonly misspelled words are corrected. These are typically city names and street names. Due to the large number of possible misspellings, not all of them can be accurately detected and corrected.

- Example: The street address 1600 ampytheatre parkways is corrected to 1600 Amphitheatre PKWY. The spelling of the city name as "pheonix" is corrected to "Phoenix".

=== Uniform city names ===
Many cities have several different, commonly used names. Each ZIP Code in the Address Management System has one preferred city name and may have one or more acceptable city names.

CASS-certified software accepts as standard any "preferred" or "acceptable" city for a five-digit ZIP Code. Only a city that is "preferred" or "acceptable" is recognized as standard. These systems attempt to correct incorrect city names, and any that cannot be corrected are rejected.

- Examples: "New York City", "Empire State", "Greeley Square" and "Manhattan" in ZIP Code 10001 are standardized to "New York". Meanwhile, the "preferred" city of "Floral Park" or either of the "acceptable" cities of "Bellerose Village" or "South Floral Park" is accepted as standard for use in ZIP Code 11001.

=== Completion ===
An address must be complete in order to be valid. This means that it must have a street, city, state and ZIP code. Whenever possible, addresses that are incomplete have the missing information added.

If a valid ZIP code is provided but the city and state are missing, the city and state names are added.

- Example: "1600 Amphitheatre Pkwy 94043" is expanded to "1600 Amphitheatre Pkwy Mountain View CA 94043"

If valid names for city and state are provided but the ZIP code is missing, the ZIP code is added.

Example: Dethaw Cotman Jr 2117 R Street SE corner 22st. Washington DC 20020

=== International Standardized Address examples ===
The requirements of standardized addresses vary significantly, with required information, formatting, and line order changing according to national addressing protocols and local regulations.

Here are some examples of standardized addresses by country, which will give an insight into the type of variations in address formatting required for global addressing.

International Standardized Address examples
Country (Int. Code, Lang Code)	Standardized Address
China (CHN, CN (Native))	Line 1: Postal Code, Line 2: Administrative Area Locality, Dependent Locality, Secondary Dependent Locality, Thoroughfare, Dependent Thoroughfare, Premise, SubBuilding, PostBox, Organization
France (FRA, FR)	Line 1: Organization, Line 2: SubBuilding, Building, Line 3: Premise Thoroughfare, Line 4: Dependent Thoroughfare, Line 5: PostBox, Town, Line 6: Secondary Dependent Thoroughfare, Line 7: Dependent Locality
Germany (DEU, DE)	Line 1: Organization, Line 2: Postbox, Line 3: Thoroughfare, Premise, SubBuilding, Line 4: Dependent Thoroughfare, Line 5: PostalCode, Locality
India (IND, IN)	Line 1: Organization, Line 2: PostBox, Line 3: SubBuilding, Building, Line 4: Premise Thoroughfare, Line 5: Dependent Thoroughfare, Line 6: Secondary Dependent Thoroughfare, Line 7: Dependent Locality, Line 8: Locality, Administrative Area PostalCode
United Kingdom (GBR, GB)	Line 1: Organization, Line 2: Department, Line 3: PostBox, Line 4: SubBuilding, Line 5: Premise Thoroughfare, Line 6: Secondary Dependent Locality, Line 7: Dependent Locality, Line 8: Locality Administrative Area, PostalCode

== Delivery Point Validation ==
Delivery Point Validation (DPV) provides the highest level of address accuracy checking. In a DPV process, the address is checked against the USPS Address Management System (AMS) data file to ensure that it exists as an active delivery point. The USPS does not offer DPV validation on their website however there are companies that offer services to perform DPV verification and are certified by the USPS see also CASS Certification.

The standardized address is then compared against the entire list of valid addresses in the Address Management System to determine if it is a valid address. Address validity is based on many different factors, including address renumbering (via the USPS Locatable Address Conversion System) and address completeness. If an exact match is not found, an acceptable alternative is used (if available).

- Example: 123 North Main Street, New York, NY 10010 is an apartment building with 100 apartments in it. If an apartment number is not specified, the default address (lobby) is used for delivery.

If the address is valid, it is assigned a ZIP+4 code something like this: 12344-5678, where the first five digits are the ZIP code and the trailing four digits are the delivery range. An address with a ZIP+4 code (or nine-digit ZIP code) is considered to be valid. In most cases, this means that the address is deliverable. However, if the USPS has the address listed as "VACANT", it is not delivered, even though the address is valid.

- Note: An address can still be valid (but not deliverable by the USPS) if it is a remote location and only served by a private carrier such as UPS or FedEx.

== Benefits ==
- Verify and correct addresses BEFORE mailing
- Correct addresses in a list
- Remove duplicated addresses from a list based on the standardized address
- Qualify for USPS bulk mailing discounts
- Minimize delivery delays by only using valid addresses

== Providers ==
The USPS offers address verification directly on its website. Addresses are processed one at a time by typing the address into the provided fields. The USPS also licenses its services to third-party companies that provide the CASS certification in bulk. These third-party providers typically allow processing of address lists in CSV or Excel format. They may also provide an API allowing the use of address verification services from within a program or website.

In the UK, the Royal Mail provides address verification directly on their site and also licence their data to third-party providers to allow address checking services to be provided to organizations wishing to capture accurate addresses in their ecommerce checkout and online forms. Unlike the US system, the PAF is not geospatially hierarchical; it specifies the hierarchy of post sorting offices. The PAF does not mandate a ‘street’ but can include a subordinate sorting office name; these typically occur in rural areas. There is a separate National Address Gazetteer that incorporates the hierarchy of geospatial location data for all buildings in England and Wales (Place Name Gazetteer for Scotland). The PAF should be used to locate a person (to send a bill), and the Gazetteer when locating a property (using a satnav). Further information can be solicited from British Standard 7666.
