= AM2 =

AM2 may refer to:

- Socket AM2, a CPU socket for AMD desktop processors
- Sega AM2, a research and development team for the video game company Sega
- Arp-Madore 2, an open star cluster
- A fictional element from The Sten Chronicles
- Animusic
- AM2 or AM², a yearly anime convention in its 2nd year held in Anaheim, California
- Achievement Measurement 2, a practical skills test required for becoming an electrician within Britain
- British Rail Class 302, a class of Electric Multiple Units originally known as AM2
- Air mass 2, the solar spectra after passing through two atmosphere thicknesses
- A⋅m^{2}, a unit of magnetic moment equivalent to J/T
