= A&M =

A&M may refer to:

== Education ==
- A&M Consolidated High School, a four-year public high school in College Station, Texas

=== Higher education ===
- Arts et Métiers ParisTech, a French engineering school

==== Land-grant universities ====
A&M could refer to any of a number of Agricultural and Mechanical Universities created by the Morrill Land-Grant Acts:

- Alabama A&M University
- Florida A&M University
- Louisiana State University and Agricultural and Mechanical College, commonly referred to as just "Louisiana State University" or "LSU"
- Prairie View A&M University
- Southern University and A&M College
- Texas A&M University, the flagship institution of the Texas A&M University System

==== Community colleges ====
- Northeastern Oklahoma A&M College

==== Former names of universities ====
- Mississippi A&M College, now Mississippi State University
- Oklahoma A&M College, now Oklahoma State University–Stillwater
- Colorado A&M, now Colorado State University
- Ohio A&M College, now The Ohio State University

== Companies ==
- Alvarez and Marsal
- A&M Records, a record label formed in 1962 by Herb Alpert and Jerry Moss
- Arkansas and Missouri Railroad
- Atkinson & Marquart Rifle Co., creator of the .475 A&M Magnum American rifle cartridge

== Miscellaneous ==
- Hymns Ancient and Modern, a hymnal widely used in the Church of England since the 1860s

== See also ==
- AM (disambiguation)
