= Arp-Madore 2 =

Open cluster in Puppis

Observation data (J2000.0 epoch)
- Right ascension: 07^{h} 38^{m} 46^{s}
- Declination: −33° 50′ 36″
- Distance: 30,000 ly (9197 pc)

Physical characteristics
- Other designations: AM 2, ESO 368-SC 07, IAU cluster number C0737-337

Associations
- Constellation: Puppis

Arp-Madore 2 (also known as AM 2) is an open cluster of stars in the constellation of Puppis. It is almost 30,000 light-years away and about 5 billion years old.

== See also ==
- Arp-Madore 1
