= Assembly Member =

Assembly Member or AM may refer to:

- A Member of the London Assembly (2000–pres.)
- A Member of the Tobago House of Assembly (1980–pres.)

== Defunct titles ==
- A Member of the National Assembly for Wales (1999–2020), now Member of the Senedd (MS)
- A member of the Northern Ireland Assembly (1973) (1973–1974)
- A Member of the Legislative Assembly of Singapore (1955–1965), which was succeeded by the Parliament of Singapore when Singapore was expelled from Malaysia in 1965
