= Arp-Madore 1 =

Globular cluster in the constellation Horologium

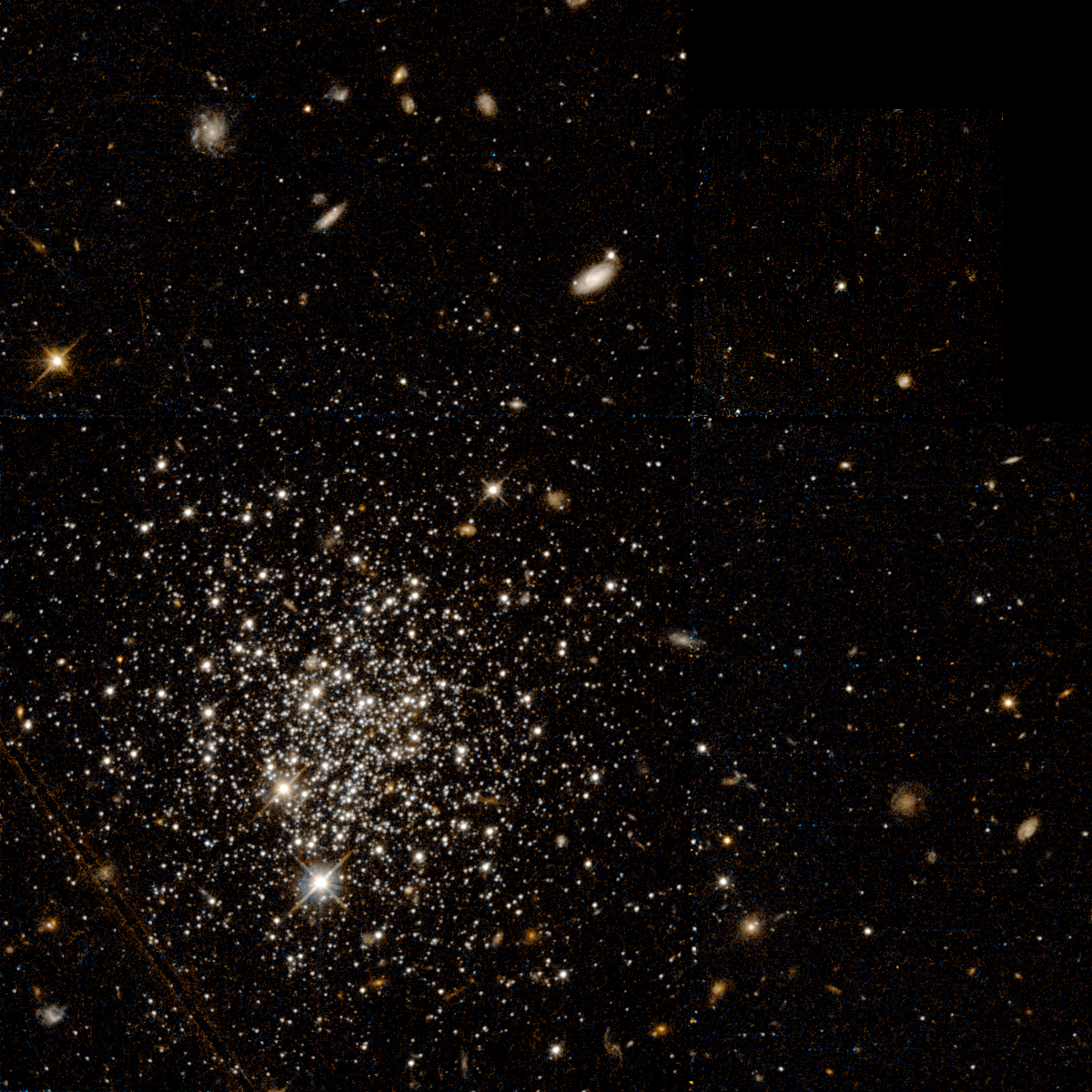
- Globular cluster Arp-Madore 1

Observation data (J2000.0 epoch)
- Constellation: Horologium
- Right ascension: 03^{h} 55^{m} 02.70^{s}
- Declination: −49° 36′ 52.0″
- Distance: 398,000 (122,000)
- Apparent magnitude (V): 15.07
- Apparent dimensions (V): 1.288 by 0.691 ′

Physical characteristics
- Other designations: E1, AM 0353-094, C 0353-497, C 0354-498, AM 1, ESO 201-10, LEDA 14098, SGC 035336-4945.6

Arp-Madore 1 (also known as AM 1) is a globular cluster visible in the constellation Horologium, located 123.3 kiloparsecs (402,000 light-years) away from Earth. It is one of the most distant known globular clusters of the Milky Way galaxy's halo; its distance gives it interest as a test case for gravitational theories. AM 1 has a visual magnitude of 15.07.

It is named after Halton Arp and Barry F. Madore, who identified it as a distant globular cluster in 1979, using the UK Schmidt Telescope, after previous researchers at the European Southern Observatory had observed its existence but not its classification.

== See also ==
- Arp-Madore 2
