= ʽAm =

ʽAm (עם) is Hebrew and Aramaic for "people, nation, tribe". It may refer to:

- The Jewish people
- another people or nation, usually in plural (ʽamim, עמים); see goyim
- ʽAm haʼaretz "common people, pagans"
- Any of the Tribes of Israel
