= Address Management System =

Database of US postal addresses

Address Management System (AMS) is the United States Postal Service master database of deliverable addresses. Address-checking tools using AMS provide address standardization, as well as city/state and ZIP Code lookup features.

Business mailers use the USPS Address Management System:-[e correct ZIP Codes. City/state lookup services use AMS to provide the city and state corresponding to any given ZIP Code.

AMS is also a general term describing a technological solution for managing street addressing.
