= Andrew Moore (musician) =

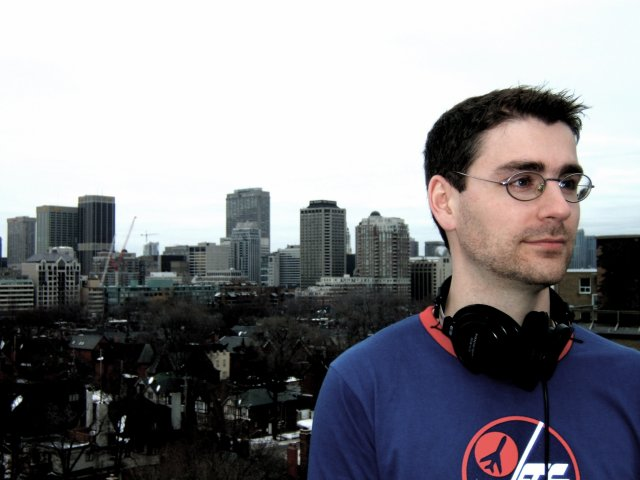
- Moore in Toronto

Background information
- Also known as: A.M.
- Born: 16 July 1979 (age 45)
- Origin: Toronto, Ontario, Canada
- Genres: Ambient, Atmospheric, Electronic, Electronica, Sampling
- Occupation(s): Musician, singer-songwriter, teacher
- Instrument(s): Vocals, guitar, keyboard
- Years active: 1996 – present
- Website: www.musicbyam.com

Andrew Moore (born 16 July 1979), better known by his stage name A.M., is an electronic musician and elementary school teacher from Toronto, Ontario, Canada.

== Music ==
=== Style ===
As a multi-instrumentalist, A.M. combines live instruments (played by A.M. and several collaborators) with samples from a wide variety of sources. A.M.'s songs are designed to evoke a different atmosphere or emotion, while leaving enough space for the listener's own interpretation. Inspired by many musical styles from classical to jazz to gospel to folk to funk to broadway, A.M. strives to create a musical collage that can entertain the casual listener while providing enough substance to intrigue those with a keen ear for musical form.

From 2009 to 2011, A.M. was part of The A.M. Electro-Funk Orchestra, a nine-piece band which included vocalists and a horn section, based in Toronto.

He is currently a member of the duo 2 Live Drew, an electro/hip-hop act that performs live remixes of 80s/90s hip hop. They played their inaugural show at the 2012 North By Northeast festival.

=== Influences ===
Much of A.M.'s music is sample-based, using loops from existing recordings, particularly funk and soul breaks, in a style similar to Fatboy Slim and DJ Shadow. Occasionally, spoken-word samples appear out of context, a technique often used by British electronic duo Lemon Jelly.

== Discography ==
A.M.'s discography includes five full-length albums, as well as music written for stage and television. A.M.'s music has sold around the world, and has been featured on CBC Radio and in The Globe and Mail.

- This Is Me, Dancing (2005) – features live instrument cameo appearances by Drew Heinmiller, Phil Carmichael, Marty Smyth, Mike Fallow, and Meghan Roberts
- Underground (2006)
- Today Is... (2008)
- Let's Spend The Day Together (2009)
- Fluorescent (2014)

== Projects ==
For his second album, Underground, he recorded several hours of ambient noise while riding Toronto's public transportation system, and used selected clips as samples.

For his third album, Today Is..., A.M. went through hours of home video and used sound clips as the base samples for the album.

For his fourth album, Let's Spend the Day Together, by open request and invitation A.M. asked the world to participate by recording a 'sonic snapshot' of the sounds of daily life on 23 May 2008 which were mixed and released as a full-length LP.

For his fifth album, Fluorescent, he created "album mashups" by sampling albums he grew up listening to, and "TV show remixes" using theme songs and scenes from television shows such as The Golden Girls and The Cosby Show.

== Personal life ==
His main job is working as a Grade 9 and 11 teacher at Bayview Glen School in Toronto. In 2008, he was featured on the CBC's School of Rock podcast, about teachers who are musicians in their spare time.
