= Nanteuil-le-Haudouin =

- Commune
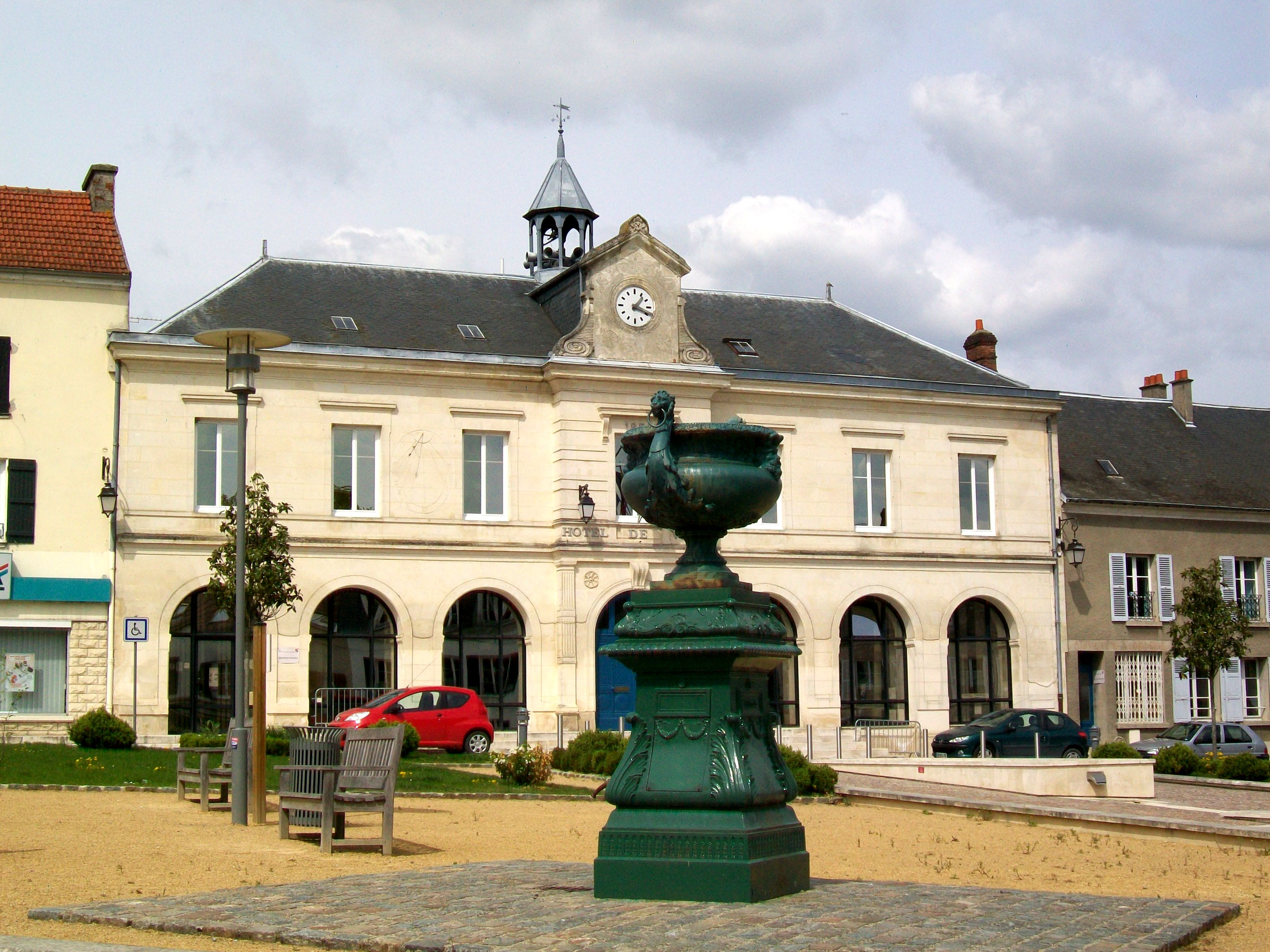
- The town hall in Nanteuil-le-Haudouin

- Coat of arms
- Location of Nanteuil-le-Haudouin
- Location within France Location within Hauts-de-France
- Coordinates: 49°08′33″N 2°48′41″E
- Country: France
- Region: Hauts-de-France
- Department: Oise
- Arrondissement: Senlis
- Canton: Nanteuil-le-Haudouin
- Intercommunality: Pays de Valois

Government
  - Mayor (2020–2026): Gilles Sellier
- Area^{1}: 20.95 km^{2} (8.09 sq mi)
- Highest elevation: 128 m (420 ft)
- Lowest elevation: 78 m (256 ft)
- Population (2023): 4,258
  - Density: 203.2/km^{2} (526.4/sq mi)
- Time zone: UTC+01:00 (CET)
  - Summer (DST): UTC+02:00 (CEST)
- INSEE/Postal code: 60446 /60440
- ^{1} French Land Register data, which excludes lakes, ponds, glaciers > 1 km^{2} (0.386 sq mi or 247 acres) and river estuaries.

Nanteuil-le-Haudouin (French pronunciation: [nɑ̃tœj lə odwɛ̃]) is a commune in the Oise department in northern France.

== Population ==
Historical population
Year	Pop.	±% p.a.
1968	1,712	—
1975	1,959	+1.94%
1982	2,285	+2.22%
1990	2,672	+1.98%
1999	3,126	+1.76%
2007	3,250	+0.49%
2012	3,476	+1.35%
2017	4,296	+4.33%
2023	4,258	−0.15%
Source: INSEE

== See also ==
- Communes of the Oise department
