= Military structure of the FARC–EP =

The military structure of the Fuerzas Armadas Revolucionarias de Colombia – Ejército del Pueblo ("Revolutionary Armed Forces of Colombia – People's Army", or FARC–EP), formally began to be developed after the middle of 1964, when the Colombian Army occupied the town of Marquetalia.

The Colombian Army claimed they were cleaning the last remnants of "bandolerism", a mob justice system for displacement of adversaries, developed in the 10-year struggle for power between the Conservative and Liberal parties, during La Violencia (The Violence). They were influenced by the counterinsurgency tactics developed by the United States through its famous School of the Americas. This, of course, was opposed to the vision that the farmers had of themselves, as a demobilized Communist self-defense and guerrilla force, refugees from the government of Gustavo Rojas Pinilla, working in a peaceful community. Following this attack, the scattered rebels reunited and eventually founded the FARC in 1966, establishing the beginnings of the internal structure and strategic outlook.

== Political doctrine ==
According to internal regulations, every member of the FARC–EP's military forces has to take a vow in which they formally assume the commitment of fighting to establish "social justice" in Colombia. FARC members consider the necessary path to achieve this goal is through Marxism and Leninism, additionally influenced by the ideas of the Cuban Revolution and Che Guevara.

The symbol in the center of the FARC–EP flag is a book and two rifles in the middle of a map of Colombia, which transmits the message "learn and fight for Colombia", as a sign of the importance ideological education has for the FARC–EP. The three colors in the background are yellow, blue and red, common to the flags of Ecuador, Venezuela and Colombia in northern South America. These colors also indicate the region's shared past and identity under Bolívar's Greater Colombia.

== Development ==
Roughly from 1949 to 1964, during the "La Violencia" period of Colombian history, the FARC's precursor was a small Communist guerrilla band which usually engaged in "hit and run" warfare against their enemies and members of local Colombian security forces, when not implementing necessary activities for its self-defense from rival irregular groups. The group answered only to representatives of the Colombian Communist Party, which provided political cadres, recruits and small donations as support.

Because of the period's political turmoil, the Colombian government initially was unaware of the activities of this group of rebels. Towards the end of the period the group had settled in the Marquetalia area inside the Tolima department together with some of the fighters' family members, continuing to weapons and occasionally establishing a form of defensive perimeter. The construction of a form of primitive "commune" was attempted in practice, trying to organize an autonomous settlement under collective Communist ideals, combining military concerns with daily activities.

After the May 1964 Colombian Army attack, most of the rebels in Marquetalia scattered, soon gathering under a new "Southern Bloc" (Bloque Sur) guerrilla unit, which reinitiated "hit and run" attacks and once again implemented a more offensive posture. In 1966, the FARC was formally created as a slightly enlarged guerrilla entity (estimated at a total of 350 members divided in six guerrilla fronts) that continued to engage in this type of operations, additionally placing a greater political emphasis in openly revolutionary aims.

Still, during the 1970s the FARC kept a low profile by staying inside its traditional heartland areas, while newer guerrilla groups, such as the 19th of April Movement, appeared and achieved a greater degree of national influence as well as a more active urban presence.

The Seventh Guerrilla Conference in 1982 represented a significant change in outlook, as the FARC changed its structure to better suit the needs of an ambitious rebel army (the initials -EP, Ejército del Pueblo, or "People's Army", were added to the group's name), for the purposes of increasing its recruitment and financing, as well for eventually achieving an international "status of belligerence" in its fight against the more numerous forces of the Colombian state's security apparatus.

== Leadership ==
After these developments, eventually multiple U.S. and other military experts considered that the FARC's Manuel Marulanda Vélez, as a veteran guerrilla fighter and as an efficient commander for four decades, was able to lead perhaps the most capable and dangerous Marxist guerrilla organization in the world.

Marulanda is often referred to as "Sureshot" (Tirofijo), because of a reputation for using firearms accurately during his earlier years as an insurgent. For some of those analysts, an allegedly problematic aspect in Marulanda's profile concerns the fact that he has limited educational background, due to the poor economic conditions that his family and a number of others had to face when growing up in rural Colombia.

Jacobo Arenas, on the other hand, as the FARC's main ideologue, had political and ideological education as a communist intellectual, thus it is believed that he realized that FARC's initial status was not up to the necessary standards needed to properly fight a Colombian Army that could count on the aid of the United States from time to time.

This was possible since, after the 1959 Cuban Revolution, the United States increased its military influence throughout the region through the activities of the U.S. Southern Command, an organization tasked with overseeing and handling military affairs in Latin America. U.S. Special Forces, such as the Green Berets, specifically trained to fight in Latin America jungles for counterinsurgency operations. Additionally, the widespread Spanish language was also taught to many members of U.S. forces in the region. From the perspective of Arenas, the challenge of having to potentially face the most technologically advanced military in the world made upgrading FARC's own military capabilities a necessity.

== Belligerence of the FARC–EP ==
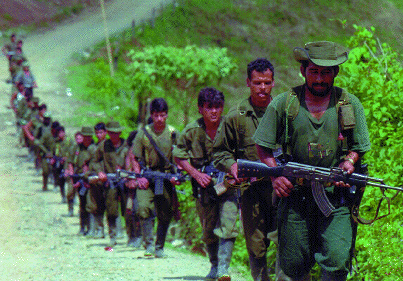
FARC insurgents

The role of Jacobo Arenas in FARC's military reorganization was significant. After the Seventh Guerrilla Conference in 1982, Arenas started to work toward the goal of turning the FARC from a guerrilla organization to a rebel army (the "People's Army"). According to his instructions, FARC added ranks and badges to a number of its uniforms, as well as introducing a new inventory system for firearms and ammunition, in addition to providing new weapons and technology for FARC militants. In theory, a properly organized and trained guerrilla army would thus meet the international requirements for the recognition of a "state of belligerence", contained within the Geneva Conventions of August 12, 1949 and its additional protocols. FARC considers that it lives up to this, and therefore argues that it has been accepted as a legitimate army, in particular during negotiations with different Colombian governments.

Their opponents and the Colombian government claim that the practice of civilian kidnapping for ransom and the tax levied on coca crop buyers makes it an illegitimate army and point to a wide rejection of the guerrilla policies in national surveys. There are assassinations of opponents and forced displacements inflicted on the general population by all the forces involved in the Colombian Armed Conflict that makes the belligerence status claim harder to accept. This is further complicated by the coca eradication efforts of the Colombian government that involve US support and have led to the declaration of the FARC being a terrorist organization by the United States government and the European Union.

Some of the reforms implemented by Arenas were later published and transmitted to the media, as follows:

FARC regulations:

- The Statute formulates the ideological foundations of the FARC–EP; it defines its organic structure, the regime of command, the obligations and rights of the combatants and the basic principles of the revolutionary organization.
- The regulations of the disciplinary regime deals with essential matters of military order.
- The internal rules of command deals with the usual daily practices of the different units of the FARC–EP.

FARC structure:

- Squad: the basic unit consisting of 12 combatants.
- Guerilla: consists of two squads.
- Company (Compañía): consists of two guerrillas.
- Column: consists of two or more companies.
- Front: consists of more than one column.
- Central High Command (Estado Mayor Central): designates the highest command of each front.
- Block of Fronts: consists of five or more fronts. It co-ordinates and unifies the activity of the fronts in a specific zone of the country.
- Central High Command: designates the High Command of each Block. They co-ordinate the areas of the respective blocks.
- Secretariat of the Central High Command (Secretariado del Estado Mayor Central): the superior organism of direction and command of the FARC–EP. Its agreements, orders and decisions rule over the entire movements and all its members.

== Main operational regions ==
The FARC–EP is organized into seven main operational regions and the "block" is the name given to each FARC military command inside one of the main operational regions. According to the FARC's military operational strategies, which take into account factors such as the size of the area and its population, each block is composed of between 5 and 15 of fronts. In addition to that, there are around 5 specially trained independent or elite fronts attached to some blocks, according to operational requirements.

There are also mobile fronts under the direct control of the FARC's high command. The names given to these additional or "special" units usually include historical figures or the FARC's revolutionary heroes, for the purpose of identification. As an example, there is a mobile front in the Cauca department, the "Jacobo Arenas Front", which played a significant role in several of the FARC's April 2005 attacks.

The FARC's force strength is usually estimated to be at around 15,000 to 18,000 men and women, organized in more than 80 fronts. The exact number is publicly unknown, though allegedly not even the FARC keeps a complete and comprehensive record of all its operatives due to geographical, operational and contextual difficulties. Since the 1980s, one of the long-term goals of the FARC has been to increase its military manpower up to at least 30,000.

The main operational regions ("blocks") are,

- The Northern or Caribbean bloc, located in the northern part of Colombia bordering Venezuela, Atlantic coast, additionally operating about 5 fronts.
- The Northwestern bloc, bordering Panama and operating about 10 fronts. It covers the departments of Antioquia, Chocó, Córdoba and also the Atlantic and Pacific coasts around the Middle Magdalena valley.
- The Middle Magdalena bloc, bordering Venezuela and operating about 8 fronts. It covers parts of the departments of Antioquia, Bolívar, Cesar, Santander, and Boyacá.
- The Central bloc covers the central highlands of Colombia, operating about 6 fronts. It includes the historical area of Marquetalia, considered as the birthplace of the FARC.
- The Eastern bloc is the largest operational region and should be operating about 20 fronts. It covers the region of the eastern Andes mountains and the central departments of Cundinamarca and Boyacá.
- The Western bloc, bordering Ecuador and the Pacific coast, operating about 15 fronts. It covers the western Andes mountains and reaches the Pacific Ocean.
- The Southern bloc bordering Ecuador and Peru, and operating about 16 fronts. It covers the departments of Caquetá, Huila, Putumayo, and parts of Cauca.

The estimate of the total number of fronts operating in each main operational region (block), is dated up to July 2005, as done by several journalists monitoring reports from the Colombian war.

== Military equipment ==
At the beginning of the FARC's military campaign in 1964 they employed a diverse assembly of weaponry, most of it captured or bought from individual sellers, and this generally continued to be the case. Even today, several FARC fronts still possess small quantities of many different kinds of rifles and shotguns.

After the end of the 1980s, the FARC has widely adopted as its most reliable weapon the soviet made AK-47 assault rifle. The AK-47 rifle is famous worldwide as employed by members of the Vietnamese guerrillas, when they were fighting the Army of the Republic of Vietnam and the United States Army. According to some guerrillas, the AK-47 is easy to use, as sometimes it can be hidden in water or mud, and after a cleaning it usually works without any trouble (such as ammunition jamming).

According to U.S. intelligence (such as CIA), the FARC–EP has purchased thousands of AK-47 rifles from Russia, through connections with the Russian mafia. Colombian and regional authorities believe that the FARC has bought possibly greater quantities of such weapons from black market dealers in Peru and Central America, as well as corrupt military officials. Based on these facts and believing that the FARC is looking for additional AK-47 suppliers, the United States opposed the 2004 announcement of Venezuelan arms purchase of 100,000 AK-103 rifles from Russia, for the purposes of upgrading the military equipment in Venezuelan army.The assumption that the AK-103 rifles from Venezuela could end up in the hands of the insurgents ended up being a reality, there are currently AK-103 rifles in the FARC-EP dissidents and they have been seen in several videos from these Dissident groups such as the "Frente 45" and the "Frente 10 Guadalupe Salcedo" in these communications have also been seen with Russian PSO optical sights and SVD rifles of the same models used by the Venezuelan army

Despite US opposition the purchase went ahead as planned. Since the end of the 1990s, the FARC has made widespread use of homemade mortars, adapted from domestic gas cylinders. The resulting blasts from gas cylinder bombs can produce sizable explosions comparable to military grade small artillery pieces, and as such have been effective during FARC attacks against somewhat hardened targets in rural military bases, as well as Colombian Police positions in small towns and villages. The know how for making these mortars is believed to have been supplied to the FARC by the Provisional IRA. However, this weapon is considered to be extremely hard to aim with a decent degree of accuracy, causing a large quantity of collateral damage and many potential civilian casualties. Human rights organizations, the Catholic Church and the United Nations have repeatedly demanded that the FARC abandon its use of this particular weapon, which they condemn.

A few 60 mm and 81 mm mortars, some of them captured from Colombian Army personnel, were also effectively used by the FARC to support attacks on Colombian military and Police bases between 1996 and 1998, as well as during smaller scale operations leading up to the year 2000.

Other known explosive devices used by the FARC are anti-personnel landmines and roadside bombs (sometimes considered similar to "claymore mines"), increasingly employed during the FARC's 2005 attacks. Civilian casualties due to the use of these mines have also led to their rejection by NGOs and human rights organizations.

== Female fighters ==
Latin America at large has been considered by some analysts as a place where women are still subject to a significant degree of discrimination. Obtaining a degree in education is one of the dreams that many women inside Western civilization aspire to. Low income Latin American women, while culturally belonging to the same Western civilization, often do not have the opportunity to continue their studies up to higher education due to poverty and unemployment.

Some poor Latin American women are involved in illegal activities such as prostitution and gang criminality from their childhood, in order to support themselves and their families. As a result, it is argued that many such women in the region curse the social injustices that have led them to live under such conditions. Child prostitution continues to be a serious social problem in the region today, and a number of the human rights organizations have criticized the fact that this problem has not been properly addressed by most Latin American governments.

In this context, several women have joined guerrilla and rebel groups as a way to express their rejection of the situation that they have been forced to live with. A famous Latin American female fighter was the second in command of the FMLN, commander Ana María of El Salvador. She was an intellectual woman and was considered as an icon among revolutionary women in the region. Eventually she was brutally killed by her own comrades on April 6, 1983, in Managua, Nicaragua, after having made multiple sacrifices during her life as a guerrilla. The FMLN blamed its leader Cayetano Carpio as the person responsible for the crime, and he committed suicide.

The FARC as an organization also reserves a place for women fighters. According to the FARC, they invite all the Colombian women to join in what they consider as their struggle against the injustices of society. In May 1964, there were only two female fighters in the FARC's precursor rebel group, but now it is believed by some analysts that women may make up a third of the FARC's fighters. Internal FARC regulations state that the status of women in FARC is considered to be equal to that of men, and that women can be present in all units, from small squads to entire fronts. Women usually are not grouped together in specific units, as was the case in other countries, and they can also participate in all military operations.

The FARC also reserves a place for motherhood among its female fighters. They can give birth to babies while still being involved in the FARC's armed struggle. However, many women who have left their ranks report that they have been forced to have abortions, or their babies have been abandoned in towns. In January 2008, a former guerrilla woman was forced to abort her child and said it was the same rule for all women in her front. The role of women in FARC is considered to be summed up by the formula "fighter as well as mother". Male fighters are allowed to fall in love with their female comrades, as long as they continue to perform their duties responsibly. However, lately, there have been reports of combatants abandoning their ranks, who complain of cases of AIDS, as boredom and lack of goals in the jungle has led them to decadence and low spirits. Many women get punished, raped and executed, and the romantic idea of female fighters is long gone.

In a situation considered to be similar to that of the Iron Triangle in Vietnam, communist families can be established throughout the regions of Colombia where the FARC has semi-permanent bases. It is considered by the FARC that these families can give birth to a "new socialist culture" in the country. The growth of the role of women in FARC is thought to also partially reflect the growth of the FARC's civilian supporters throughout the decades. Critics point to a development of a "Nordic capitalist society" in which the families related to FARC reap all the benefits that could be achieved in the middle of a modern armed conflict, and that circumstance perpetuate the state of low intensity war transforming it into a viable economic enterprise.

Male and female FARC civilian supporters, real or imagined, have been the targets of paramilitary fighters (which the FARC considers to be influenced and supported by the CIA as well as traditional Cold War anti-communism), some of which have employed brutal methods (such as the use of chainsaws) during the massacres that they have committed against those they believe to be sympathizers of the rebels. The responsibility for this kind of mass massacres have also been put on FARC shoulders, specially of informants for the Colombian Army or "sapos" as they are called.

As a violation to human rights, FARC has also punished women that refuse to keep fighting. In some fronts, there are groups of pre-teen girls carrying weapons and leaving their education in order to prepare for the military life.

== The FARC–EP Military Academy ==
=== Structure overview ===
Military training is essential in every military organization in the world. From 1949 to the early 1960s, the military training of the FARC's precursors, contemporary leftist rebel forces, was considerably low, due to physical and economic limitations as well as the uneven and limited threat represented by the Colombian government's security forces. The end of the Plan LASO's "Operation Marquetalia" in 1964 soon led to the birth of the FARC, which now considered that a more advanced type of military training was necessary to face the growing threat of the Colombian military and its U.S. backers.

Between 1966 and the early 1970s the FARC started to implement formalized military training, according to the plans made in the group's 1966 conference, which had established the necessary guidelines and plans to achieve future goals. Most small scale FARC attacks during this period were intended to gain captured military equipment of diverse origin. Later on, the FARC gradually got used to newer weapons and equipment such as Russian made AK-47 assault rifle and eventually also obtained some advanced communication technology, systems which are useful in warfare for coordination among guerrilla fighting units.

After experiencing a decade of warfare with an increasingly higher profile, the FARC needed another conference to establish a more sophisticated military plan for its future operations. The conference was held in late 1970s under the leadership of Manuel Marulanda and Jacobo Arenas, which by then were the FARC's key leaders. According to some historical reports about the FARC in the 1970s, they then decided to form a military academy similar to the ones in existing socialist countries, like those in the Soviet Union, Cuba, and also like those employed by its enemies, like the United States and the United Kingdom. The FARC identified several difficulties that made the situation increasingly complex due to the growing threat of the enemy, and decided to take a step forward in a different form, through maintaining a policy of advanced military training. FARC had built a training structure in a totally different way, not directly comparable with those of orthodox military organizations, as each level of training had to end with a period of combat experience in real life warfare, before progressing to the next level.

=== Infantry training ===
To achieve its military goals, the FARC considered that they must have properly trained fighters similar in capability to Colombian Army counter guerrilla units, which were trained by U.S. Special Forces, to supplement the limited strength of their guerrilla force.

Newly recruited guerrilla fighters had to follow a two-month basic military training program that is different from the physical training (PT) programs. The basic training consists of having to identify firearms and getting used to specific models and their physical operation, such as the Russian AK-47 and U.S. M16 assault rifles, as well as mortar rifles and basic communication systems. The PT programs are separate from the main training schedule, as they are included in the day-to-day life of a guerrilla, by climbing mountains, running with loads, participating in the digging of military trenches, making bunkers and occasionally also some swimming programs taking place in natural water resources such as rivers and lakes. Playing of soccer is another activity available to all male and female guerrillas as it gives them a proper mental relaxation. FARC clearly advises all guerrilla commanders to avoid assigning barely trained guerrillas directly in the front lines, establishing that they only have to serve in rear lines when coming fresh from basic training.

After the basic training for newly recruited guerrillas, the guerrilla commanders have to coordinate with the guerrillas assigned as military instructors about their evaluation and performance records. After some time, they organize another set of advanced training for the better-performing guerrillas. The second phase of training can be considered as similar to that of elite forces, also including the organization of military parades and the issuing of firearms. After this training and parades, the FARC gives its members the title of "Revolutionary of Colombia", establishing the obligation to vow to fight for the goals and ideals of the group and for Colombia, until their death.

=== Military intelligence units ===
The growing threat of the U.S. and Colombian military, as perceived by the FARC, created the need to establish military intelligence units. From the perspective of the FARC, the usefulness of this type of unit was considered necessary to face different Colombian Army offensive operations, including in recent years the U.S. aided 2004 Plan Patriota, considered as comparable to the so-called "Operation Marquetalia" in 1964. The survival of the FARC–EP's Eastern and Southern blocks, when faced an 18,000 strong Colombian Army force supported by UH-60 Black Hawk helicopters, can be considered to depend on the operations of such military intelligence units.

The training of the members of military intelligence units is difficult as it takes more time for them to learn to adapt to the necessary aspects of modern warfare. After 1982 establishment of the FARC training school for these intelligence fighters, their main role is to take part in recon operations, gathering data from guerrillas and their informants, useful for the purposes of developing tactical and strategic military plans. General recon training is given to all guerrillas in the second phase of training.

The role of military intelligence units is not limited to gathering recon details, as it is further expanded to include an awareness of U.S. military training, as well as of its strategic plans and in general of many of the military aspects of the war in Colombia. FARC operatives that participate in these units usually are also intellectuals which can concentrate in studying military science, as another part of their service is to introduce newer weapons to the guerrilla group. The regular training given to all the FARC's commanders at certain ranks includes an overview of the new strategies and weapons found to be useful in the war.

These units have a role to play outside the country, as much of the FARC's arms smuggling work is handled by them. Allegedly, the CIA is aware about the work of the FARC's military intelligence units and also that of its diplomatic corps, and thus has used its intelligence networks throughout Latin America and the United States to attempt to capture operatives that travel outside Colombia. According to the FARC, the capture of Rodrigo Granda in Venezuela in late and the capture of other operatives, such as Simon Trinidad, in Ecuador would allegedly include CIA participation.

=== Military rank structure ===
The Seventh guerrilla Conference held in 1982 eventually changed the FARC's military training manuals according to the establishment of new military ranks. It was decided to organize schools to teach the theories of military science and of international military law, as adopted by the FARC–EP, to the higher ranking guerrillas. The major characteristic necessary to be considered as a higher ranking guerrilla is that the individual have around five years of experience in the Colombian war. Formally, the minimum age for front line fighter is eighteen, but apparently rear line fighters below that age limit have been captured by the Colombian Army or occasionally have deserted.

The table below compares the ranks in the FARC–EP with traditional ranks of the Colombian army for a better understanding of the ranks in the FARC–EP after the changes made in the 1982 Seventh guerrilla conference.

Traditional Army Rank followed by FARC–EP Rank:

1. Corporal second class – Squad deputy
2. Corporal first class – Squad Commander
3. Sergeant second class – Guerrilla Deputy
4. Sergeant first class/ Staff Sergeant – Guerrilla Commander
5. Sergeant Major – Company Deputy
6. Sub-lieutenant / Second Lieutenant – Company Commander
7. Lieutenant – Column Deputy
8. Captain – Column Commander
9. Major – Front Deputy
10. Lieutenant Colonel – Front Commander
11. Colonel – Block Deputy
12. Brigadier General – Block Commander
13. Major General – Central High Command Deputy
14. General – Commander of the Central High Command
15. Highest FARC–EP rank Commander in Chief of the Central High Command

A FARC company is a lower level of command (the traditional FARC company consists of only 48 men) than a company in traditional army organisation.

== Chain of command ==
The Revolutionary Armed Forces of Colombia's chain of command is divided as follows:

1. Commander in Chief of the FARC–EP, ultimate decision maker. Alfonso Cano held this position at the time of his death.
2. The Secretariat is the seven member leadership
3. The Central High Command (Estado Mayor Central): composed of some 30 top commanders including the seven leaders of the top command; the secretariat is the highest organ of direction and command of the FARC–EP. Its agreements, orders and decisions rule over the entire movement and all its members. It designates the High Command of each bloc and co-ordinates the areas of the respective blocs.
4. Bloc: consists of five or more fronts. Seven blocs have divided the country's territory strategically to allow greater maneuverability and control.
5. Front: Consist of anywhere between 50 and 500 men. Control and attack certain areas of the country.
6. Column: Larger fronts are divided into columns.
7. Company (Compañía) : These men, usually around 50, stay together and plan ambushes or other surprise attacks.
8. Guerrilla: consists of two squads.
9. Squad: the basic unit consisting of 12 combatants.

=== Secretariat ===
The Central High Command is composed of seven ideological and military leaders of the FARC–EP. It is speculated that some of them could be hiding in the Colombian frontiers with Ecuador and Venezuela, which has been one of the reasons for Colombian military operations in the area. Others are thought to be somewhere in the southeasternmost regions of the country. In a March 2006 United States Department of Justice indictment, $5 million US dollars were offered for information leading to the capture of 47 key FARC figures that remain at large, including the members of the Secretariat.

| Alias | Name | Note |
|---|---|---|
| Timoleón Jiménez, "Timochenko" | Rodrigo Londoño Echeverri | Became Commander in Chief after the death of Alfonso Cano. Prior to this he commanded the Middle Magdalena Bloc and was responsible for Intelligence and Counter-Intelligence. |
| Iván Márquez | Luciano Marín Arango | Commander of the Northwest Bloc. Joined the Secretariat after the 2003 death of Efraín Guzmán. |
| Joaquín Gómez, "Usuriaga" | Milton de Jesús Toncel Redondo | Commander of the Southern Bloc, promoted to the Secretariat to replace Raúl Reyes in 2008. |
| Mauricio Jaramillo, "El Médico" | Jaime Alberto Parra | Commander of the Eastern Bloc, he replaced Iván Ríos in 2008. |
| Pablo Catatumbo | Jorge Torres Victoria | Commander of the Western Bloc and political chief. Entered the Secretariat after Manuel Marulanda's 2008 death. |
| Pastor Alape | Felix Antonio Muñoz Lascarro | Leads the Middle Magdalena Bloc with Timoleón Jiménez. Entered the Secretariat after Mono Jojoy's death. |

Former members of the Secretariat

| Alias | Name | Note |
|---|---|---|
| Manuel Marulanda Vélez, "Tirofijo" | Pedro Antonio Marín | Historical Founder of FARC–EP. Commander in Chief. Died of natural causes in 2008. |
| Jacobo Arenas | Luis Alberto Morantes Jaimes | With Marulanda, founder of FARC–EP. Political chief. Died of natural causes in 1990. |
| Alfonso Cano | Guillermo León Sáenz Vargas | Promoted to Commander in Chief after Manuel Marulanda's death. Founder of Clandestine Colombian Communist Party. Killed in action by the Colombian Army on November 4, 2011. |
| Jorge Briceño Suárez, "Mono Jojoy" | Victor Julio Suárez Rojas | Chief Commander of Military Wing. Killed in action on Sept. 22, 2010 while Colombian troops air raided a FARC camp near La Macarena, Meta. |
| Iván Ríos | Manuel Jesús Muñoz Ortiz | Peace Negotiator, Head of Central Bloc, killed by one of his security chiefs in March 2008 |
| Raúl Reyes | Luis Edgar Devia Silva | Traditional "Spokesman of FARC", killed in action on 1 March 2008 during a Colombian air assault on a FARC camp inside Ecuador. |
| Efraín Guzmán | Noel Matta | Died of natural causes in 2003. |

=== Blocs ===
==== Eastern Bloc ====
Up to 9350 members.

| Alias | Name | Note |
|---|---|---|
| Germán Briceño Suárez, "Granobles" | Noé Suárez Rojas | |
| Jorge Briceño Suárez, "Mono Jojoy" | Victor Julio Suárez Rojas | Dead on Sept. 23, 2010. |
| Carlos Antonio Lozada | Luis Antonio Lozada Gallo | |
| Romaña | Henry Castellanos Garzón | |

==== Western Bloc ====
Up to 4800 members.

| Alias | Name | Note |
|---|---|---|
| Pablo Catatumbo | Jorge Torres Victoria | |
| Gustavo López Gómez, "Pacho" | Miller Munar Munar | |
| Marco Aurelio Buendía | Luis Alfonso Guevara Álvarez | Dead in 2003. |

==== Southern Bloc ====
Up to 2900 members.

| Alias | Name | Note |
|---|---|---|
| Fabián Ramírez | José Benito Cabrera Cuevas | |
| Joaquín Gómez, "Usuriaga" | Milton de Jesús Toncel Redondo | |
| Sonia | Omaira Rojas Cabrera | Captured and extradited in 2004. |

==== Central Bloc ====
Up to 1200 members.

| Alias | Name | Note |
|---|---|---|
| Jerónimo | Raúl Duarte | |
| Jerónimo Galeano | Arquímedes Muñoz Villamil | Dead in 2011 |
| Alfonso Cano | Guillermo León Saenz Vargas | Dead in 2011 |
| Iván Ríos | Manuel Jesús Muñoz Ortiz | Dead in 2008 |

==== Middle Magdalena Bloc ====
Up to 1300 members.

| Alias | Name |
|---|---|
| Pastor Alape | Félix Antonio Muñoz Lascarro |

==== Caribbean Bloc ====
Up to 1200 members.

| Alias | Name | Note | Photo |
|---|---|---|---|
| Bertulfo | Emilio Cabrera Díaz | | |
| Martín Caballero | Gustavo Rueda Díaz | Dead in 2007 | |
| Simón Trinidad | Ricardo Palmera Pineda | Arrested and extradited in 2004 | |

==== Northwestern Bloc "Iván Ríos Bloc" ====
Up to 2500 members.

| Alias | Name |
|---|---|
| Iván Márquez | Luciano Marín Arango |

== See also ==
- Caribbean Bloc of the FARC–EP
- Central Bloc of the FARC–EP
- Eastern Bloc of the FARC–EP
- Middle Magdalena Bloc of the FARC–EP
- Military History of the FARC–EP
- Northwestern Bloc of the FARC–EP
- Southern Bloc of the FARC–EP
- Western Bloc of the FARC–EP
