= List of attacks attributed to FARC =

The following is a list of attacks attributed to the Revolutionary Armed Forces of Colombia (FARC). Since 1964, the Marxist–Leninist guerrilla organization has been fighting the Colombian government; it is the oldest insurgent group in the Americas.

FARC is considered a terrorist group by the Colombian government, the United States Department of State, Canada and the European Union.

== 2014 ==
- November 16: Colombian General Ruben Dario Alzate was kidnapped by FARC in a small village close to the provincial capital of Quibdó.
- December 19: 5 soldiers were killed and seven injured in the aftermath of a FARC ambush in the Cauca province.

== 2013 ==
- July 20: Two rebel attacks on government positions killed 19 soldiers and an unspecified number of combatants. It was the deadliest day since peace talks began in November 2012.

== 2012 ==
- January 1: FARC guerrillas attack police station in Norte de Santander, northern Colombia, injuring two policemen.
- January 3: Four army soldiers killed during hard combat with the FARCs 21 Front in southern Tolima. The soldiers were ambushed with landmines.
- January 4:
  - FARC guerrillas from the 6th Front launch artillery pieces against several police stations in the Cauca department.
  - FARC guerrillas attack the military close to the Pan-American highway between Cali and Popayán.
- January 5: One soldier and one member of FARC killed during intense combat between state forces and guerrillas in Caquetá.
- January 6: One policeman killed as guerrilla fighters from the FARC's Southern Bloc attacked police station in Putumayo, southern Colombia. One FARC member was also killed in the fighting.
- January 7: A group of 12 FARC guerrillas from the 26th Front attack a police station in Lejanías, Meta department.
- January 8: FARC guerrillas kill two policemen and wound one in a hit-and-run attack in Silvia municipality, Cauca Department.
- January 10: One soldier killed in western Antioquia as guerrillas from the 34th Front attacked a military patrol.
- January 13: One soldier wounded as FARC guerrilla throw grenades into a military office in San Vicente del Caguán. The office was the site of the 1998-2002 peace negotiations.
- January 14: Several FARC attacks in Norte de Santander leaves two policemen and three civilians wounded.
- January 15: FARC guerrillas attack military patrol with rockets and machine gun fire, killing one soldier and wounding three more. The attack took place in Nariño, near the Pacific Coast.
- January 18: One soldier killed by FARC guerrillas from the 45th Front in the Arauca Department
- January 19: Attack in El Mango, Cauca, leaves one soldier dead and two wounded. This was the 24th attack in El Mango municipality in less than one year.
- January 19–20: FARC guerrillas sabotage the El Limón oil pipeline, which runs through Colombia and transports much of the oil from several oil fields.
- January 20:
  - Around 100 FARC guerrillas attack a police patrol in the Meta Department, killing one policeman and wounding another.
  - FARC guerrillas launch a 25-minute attack with mortars and machine guns against police station in Toribío, Cauca.
  - Between two and three soldiers killed as FARC guerrillas attack communication towers in Santa Ana, west of Popayán in the Cauca Department.
- January 21: FARC guerrillas from the 36th Front attack the army with a 'horse-bomb' in Toledo, Antioquia, leaving one soldier dead and several wounded.
- January 22:
  - FARC ambush in La Guajira, near the Venezuelan border, leaves one army soldier dead and four wounded.
  - Guerrilla attack in El Tambo, Norte de Santander, leaves two policemen wounded. It is still unknown if the attackers were from ELN or FARC, as both guerrilla groups operate in the region.
- January 26: A police vehicle is attacked with small arms fire in the city of Neiva by presumed FARC guerrillas. The vehicle was transporting a captured female FARC member, and it is likely that the attack was a rescue attempt.
- January 28:
  - Policeman killed by FARC militias in Antioquia.
  - FARC guerrillas block road and burn an oil truck in the southern department of Guivare. No one was injured in the incident as the guerrillas told the driver to leave the truck before it was set on fire.
- January 29: Presumed FARC members attack police station in the Meta Department with a 'horse-bomb'.
- February 1: On policeman wounded by presumed FARC guerrillas from the 34th front in Antioquia.
- February 2:
  - FARC guerrillas from the 36th front attack military checkpoint in the Caribbean part of the Antioquia department. No casualties.
  - FARC guerrillas burn 8 oil trucks in the Catatumbo region of Norte de Santander.
- February 3:
  - FARC or Los Rastrojos are accused of detonating a motorcycle bomb outside of a police station in Tumaco, Nariño. The attack killed nine or eleven people, both policemen and civilians, while some 70 people, the majority of them policemen, were wounded and taken to hospitals in Cali for treatment. Colombian media referred to the event as one of the most devastating attacks this year.
  - Five policemen wounded as presumed FARC members detonated a bomb outside of a police station in Villarica, Cauca. The Army also reported ongoing skirmishes between FARC and the army in the municipality of Caloto in the same department.
- February 10: FARC attack in Corinto, Cauca, leaves two soldiers dead.
- February 11: FARC attack against military base in Jamundí, Valle del Cauca, leaves four soldiers killed and more than 18 wounded. This is the biggest attack the FARC guerrillas have launched in this municipality since August last year, according to press reports.
- February 18: Around 300 FARC guerrillas attack several locations, police stations and army units in the southwestern department of Cauca.
- February 22: FARC guerrillas kill three soldiers in the northern part of the Cauca department. Around eleven soldiers were also wounded in the attack.
- February 27: One soldier killed by FARC guerrillas in the northern department La Guijira.
- February 28: One soldier killed and four wounded in FARC offensive in southwest (Putumayo) Colombia.
- March 19: FARC guerrillas kill eleven soldiers in an ambush in Arauca, near the Venezuelan border.
- April 1:
  - FARC attack in Antioquia leaves one policeman dead and six wounded.
  - FARC guerrillas attack police station in Cauca, wounding two policemen.
- April 2: "[a]uthorities suspect that FARC guerrillas blew up two sections of the Rio Zulia-Ayacucho pipeline, forcing the Petroleos del Norte oil company to cease oil shipments and install protective barriers to prevent the contamination of the Catatumbo river".
- April 3:
  - One policeman killed by FARC's 15th front in Caquetá.
  - FARC members in Cauca attack police station with explosives.
- April 4: Five soldiers killed in Orito, Putumayo, as presumed FARC members detonate a bomb next to a military patrol.
- April 7:
  - At least seven soldiers killed and two wounded as FARC guerrillas from the 34th Front attack the military on the road between Quibdó and Medellín. The attack took place in the Chocó Department.
  - FARC guerrillas in Cauca attack police station with 32 rounds of artillery.
- April 8: FARC guerrillas attack military base in Caquetá. No casualties reported.
- April 9:
  - One Marine corps soldier killed by FARC militants from the 30th Front in Buenaventura municipality, Valle del Cauca
  - One policeman killed and four wounded in FARC attack in El Bordo, southern Cauca. The guerrillas were from the 6th Front and 8th Front of the FARC.
- April 27: 5 soldiers killed by FARC guerrillas in Florida, Valle del Cauca, near the regional capital Cali.
- April 28: Between 15 and 21 soldiers killed by FARC guerrillas in northern Caquetá. The soldiers had just left their helicopters when they were ambushed by guerrillas. Also missing was a French journalist working for France 24 and four soldiers. Dozens of soldiers were also wounded in the defensive action. According to Caracol Radio at least 20 army soldiers were killed in the attack.
- April 29: The 30th and 60th fronts of the FARC launch a series of attacks against police stations in the Cauca Department.

== 2011 ==
Between January and early May 2011 the Colombian government claimed that FARC-EP killed 167 soldiers and policemen.

List of attacks since May 15, 2011:

- May 15: FARC attack on a highway close to Ibagué leaves three army soldiers wounded.
- May 16: 3 policemen wounded due to FARC attack in Tuluá, Valle del Cauca.
- May 17:
  - One policeman killed in Pradera, Valle del Cauca, as a result of combat between the army and guerrillas.
  - One policeman killed in Putumayo Department.
- May 19: Nine soldiers killed in Tumaco, Nariño as the soldiers stepped into camps that were mined by the guerrillas, according to information from the FARC. One FARC member was also killed in the fighting.
- May 20: FARC attack in Cauca on a helicopter transporting money leaves one policeman and three civilians wounded.
- May 22: One policeman dead and another wounded due to FARC attack near Popayán, Cauca.
- May 24: FARC attack near Cúcuta in Norte de Santander kills two army soldiers.
- May 26: Suspected FARC attack in Popayán in Cauca.
- May 28:
  - Combat between FARC's 17th Front and the army in the Huila Department leaves one soldier dead.
  - One Soldier dies and four are injured due to a FARC attack in Buenos Aires, Cauca.
- May 30: FARC guerrillas assassinate two local politicians in Antioquia.
- May 30: FARC guerrillas rob a money transport in Cauca and kill one policeman.
- May 31: FARC attack in Arauca kills three soldiers and wounds 6 more.
- June 2:
  - FARC 'bomb' leaves three soldiers injured in Tolima.
  - FARC attack on the major highway La Línea between Cajamarca and Ibagué kills three soldiers from the Colombian army.
- June 3: Suspected FARC guerrillas of the 33:d Front destroy oil infrastructure in Norte de Santander.
- June 4: FARC sniper kills an army officer in Santander de Quilichao, Cauca.
- June 5: FARC attack on the highway between Cali and Popayán in Valle del Cauca closes the road for three hours.
- June 6: FARC defense action in Tolima Department leaves one soldier and one FARC guerrilla dead.
- June 7: FARC guerrillas killed four policemen and wounded 12 more in the Cauca Department near Popayán.
- June 9: Four Chinese oil workers are kidnapped along with their driver in Caquetá by suspected FARC guerrillas. The driver was later released. The four Chinese oil workers were freed on November 22, 2012 in exchange for $2 million.
- June 10:
  - FARC guerrillas in Tolima activate several bombs. No casualties.
  - FARC attack in Nóvita, Chocó kills one soldier and wounds one more.
- June 12:
  - FARC attack in Cauca kills one soldier and wounds seven.
  - Suspected FARC guerrillas burn a bus and destroy electricity towers in Tolima.
- June 13:
  - FARC guerrillas attack police in Caquetá, killing one policeman.
  - 2 army soldiers die and one more wounded as a result of suspected FARC landmines in Tolima.
- June 15: FARC ambush in Tolima leaves one army soldier dead.
- June 16: FARC guerrillas destroy electricity towers in Antioquia, leaving 12,000 people without electricity.
- June 19: Car bomb in Popayán kills one civilian and wounds several more. Authorities initially blamed FARC, but it is likely the perpetrators were from Ejército de Liberación Nacional.
- June 20:
  - FARC guerrillas kidnap politicians in the Meta Department.
  - Three policemen are injured by a bomb attack in Antioquia.
- June 21: FARC guerrillas ambushed and killed three policemen on the road between Cali and Buenaventura in Valle del Cauca.
- June 23: Three army soldiers and four FARC or ELN members die during combat near Cúcuta in Norte de Santander. Press reports are conflicting and it remains unclear if the guerrillas were from ELN or FARC.
- June 24: One policeman killed and three wounded due to FARC attack against money transport in Nariño.
- June 27: FARC attack in Antioquia against the paramilitary group Los Rastrojos leaves three dead.
- June 29: FARC attack on a major highway in Antioquia linking Medellín to Cartagena leaves one police major dead and four officers wounded. The road was completely shut down for 24 hours.
- July 2: FARC Guerrillas attack military base in Boyacá.
- July 4: Guerrillas of the FARC launch attack against police station in Argelia, Cauca, killing one policeman and wounding three more.
- July 6: Guerrillas of the FARC attack the military in Norte de Santander, leaving one Colombian army soldier dead.
- July 7: FARC militias in Cauca launch attack against private property, destroying seven buildings.
- July 8: 2 policemen wounded due to FARC attack in Argelia, Cauca.
- July 9: Simultaneous attacks against five different cities in the department of Cauca leaves two soldiers and four civilians dead, in addition to over 80 wounded.
- July 10:
  - Another FARC attack in Cauca kills two policemen.
  - FARC guerrillas plan and execute a successful jail break in Nariño. The prison was attacked with explosives. 18 presumed members of the FARC, including an important mid-level commander of the Western Bloc of the FARC-EP, were freed in the action.
  - FARC guerrillas attack military transports in Caquetá, leaving two soldiers wounded.
- July 11: Guerrillas from the 5th front of the FARC kill two policemen in Apartadó Antioquia.
- July 12: FARC attacks police station in Cauca with heavy mortars.
- July 13: Three Colombian army soldiers wounded by FARC mines in Arauca.
- July 14: FARC attack against electricity infrastructure in Catatumbo, Norte de Santander, leaves around 10,000 people without electricity.
- July 15: Three Colombian soldiers wounded in FARC ambush in Nariño, southern Colombia.
- July 16: FARC guerrillas of the Caribbean Bloc of the FARC-EP are suspected to be behind attack against oil infrastructure in La Guajira.
- July 17: Two policemen wounded due to attack by FARC militias in Norte de Santander.
- July 18: FARC guerrillas attack police station in Cauca with mortars.
- July 20: FARC guerrillas attack the Pan-American highway between Popayán and Pasto in Cauca, leaving three policemen wounded.
- July 21: Around 80 FARC guerrillas from a mobile column attack a military post in Tuluá, Valle del Cauca.
- July 23: One casualty due to FARC attack on the highway between Popayán and Cali.
- July 24: One soldier dead and two more wounded due to minefield planted by guerrillas in Norte de Santander.
- July 28:
  - Presumed FARC guerrillas fire mortars at police station in Santander de Quilichao, Cauca.
  - FARC guerrillas in Valle del Cauca activate bomb by remote control.
- July 29: FARC militia members kill 2 soldiers in the town of Uribe, Meta.
- July 30:
  - One policeman killed by FARC members armed with pistols near Popayán, Cauca.
  - One soldier killed by FARC guerrillas in Norte de Santander.
- July 31:
  - One soldier killed and one more wounded due to FARC attack in Cauqetá.
  - FARC rebels kidnap five oil workers in Arauca, eastern Colombia. They worked for Occidental Petroleum.
  - Two soldiers killed due to explosives in San Andrés de Cuerquia, Antioquia. The soldiers were ambushed as they entered an area with FARC presence.
- August 2: FARC attack leaves one dead and six injured in Puerto Rico, Caquetá.
- August 4:
  - FARC attacks in Argelia and El Bordo in Cauca wounds one policeman and destroys one truck one the Pan-American highway.
  - Six big oil trucks are set on fire in Guaviare, south-west Colombia. It is likely that the attack was a revenge for refusal to pay 'revolutionary tax' to the FARC.
- August 6: FARC guerrillas intercept a medical mission on a river between Meta Department and Guaviare Department. The guerrillas are believed to have taken medical equipment and medicine from the group.
- August 7:
  - Four army soldiers killed in combat with a mobile FARC column in Pradera, Valle del Cauca.
  - FARC guerrillas launch attack against oil infrastructure in Tibú, Norte de Santander.
- August 8:
  - One civilian killed and two policemen wounded due to FARC attack in Campamento, Antioquia.
  - One policeman wounded as suspected FARC guerrillas attack police outpost with explosives in Valdivia, Antioquia.
- August 9: FARC attack in Cauca Department leaves one army soldier dead and three soldiers wounded. The fighting displaced more than 1,000 people from their homes.
- August 10:
  - Five soldiers from the Colombian army die in rebel minefields in the municipalities of Toledo and Paramillo, Antioquia.
  - FARC guerrillas attack electricity towers in Taraza, Antioquia.
  - Presumed FARC guerrillas attack the highway linking Popayán to Pasto with explosives.
  - Two soldiers die in minefield planted by FARC guerrillas in Solano, Caquetá.
  - FARC guerrillas are believed to be behind explosion in Neiva, Huila.
- August 11:
  - Six Colombian soldiers killed and ten more wounded in combat with FARC's Miller Perdomo mobile column in Jamundí, Valle del Cauca. The bodies of the dead soldiers could not be recovered due to the fighting. The wounded soldiers were taken to the military hospital in Cali.
  - Twelve Colombian soldiers wounded due to FARC mines in the Meta Department.
  - Four Colombian soldiers killed and three wounded due to combat between the FARC and the army in Puerto Rico, Meta, central Colombia. At least one guerrillero of the FARC confirmed killed in the fighting. The deaths occurred when an army transport was ambushed by members of the FARC's 27 and 43 Fronts.
- August 14: Three soldiers were killed and another was wounded when they triggered landmines planted by FARC guerrillas.
- August 17: Five policemen killed and two more wounded in FARC attack in Tumaco, Nariño. According to authorities the guerrillas were most likely from the 29th front or mobile column Daniel Aldana.
- August 18: FARC attack leaves three soldiers wounded in El Mango, Cauca.
- August 20: Two policemen wounded in FARC attack in Argelia, Cauca.
- August 26:
  - Four soldiers are 'gravely injured' due to a FARC attack in Miranda, northern Cauca.
  - Three soldiers, and three civilians, two of them minors, injured in an attack by the 29th front of FARC guerrillas in the municipality of Magüi Payan, Nariño.
- August 27: Five Soldiers from the Colombian army killed due to a FARC attack in Cesar Department.
- August 29: Yet another five soldiers killed, this time in Tumaco, Nariño, when their APC was intercepted by ambushing guerrillas of the FARC's 6th Front.
- September 1:
  - One soldier killed and four civilians injured in FARC attack in Argelia, Cauca.
  - Two soldiers killed and three more wounded in a FARC attack in the northern part of the Cauca Department, bordering on Valle del Cauca. "Following the attack, the military shut down transit routes between the north of Cauca and the south of Valle del Cauca for three hours to secure the area."
- September 2: One soldier killed and two more wounded due to FARC attack near Buenaventura, Valle del Cauca.
- September 11: Three soldiers die in a rebel minefield in Norte de Santander.
- September 12: Three policemen killed by FARC guerrillas in different municipalities of Valle del Cauca.
- September 13: One soldier killed and two more wounded due to combat between FARC and the Colombian army in Caquetá. Three FARC members were reportedly killed in the fighting.
- September 14: FARC guerrillas, reportedly from the 34th Front, attack police patrol escorting a politician, leaving one person wounded. The attack took place near Medellín, Antioquia.
- September 16: FARC attack on electricity towers in Antioquia.
- September 17:
  - Two soldiers and one civilian killed in several FARC attacks in Caquetá.
  - FARC guerrillas attack an oil transport convoy belonging to a Chinese oil company, Emerald Energy. The attack took place close to San Vicente del Caguán, Caquetá. One oil worker was killed.
- September 18:
  - Six policemen and two soldiers wounded in a series of FARC attacks against the military and police in Sardinata and Las Mercedes, Norte de Santander. The attackers belong to the 33d Front, which forms a part of the Middle Magdalena Bloc of the FARC-EP.
  - One soldier killed and around 14 soldiers wounded due to FARC attack in the Cauca Department. During midday a group from the FARC's 6th Front emerged from a mountain and attacked an army counter-guerrilla unit in the valley below with rockets, mortars and machine gun fire.
- September 19:
  - FARC guerrillas from the 17th Front block a major highway just two hours drive from Neiva with a cattle truck, believed to be loaded with explosives. The truck had the text "Peligro - FARC-EP" written on it. The highway is the only one linking Huila Department with Caquetá Department.
  - Several FARC attacks in the Pacific department of Chocó. One of the attacks occurred close to the border with Panamá. One policeman was killed by FARC members in the capital of Quibdó.
- September 20:
  - Two policemen killed and one policeman badly wounded in a FARC attack in El Mango, Cauca.
  - Three army soldiers wounded in a FARC attack in Nariño, just 2 kilometres (1.2 mi) from the capital Pasto.
- September 21: Two policemen, one of them a high-ranking police chief, killed in a FARC or ELN attack in Norte de Santander, near Cúcuta.
- September 24:
  - FARC guerrillas attack police station in Corinto, Cauca with mortars and rockets.
  - One soldier wounded and one civilian killed due to combat between the 18th Front of the FARC and the army at a police station in Ituango, Antioquia.
- September 24/25: At least one soldier dead and several soldiers wounded in simultaneous FARC attacks in the municipalities of Jambaló, Caldono, Silvia, Siberia and Suárez, located in the Cauca Department.
- September 25:
  - Two policemen kidnapped and later killed by presumed FARC guerrillas in Cauca, near Popayán.
  - One soldier wounded as guerrillas from the Mobile Column Teófilo Forero launch attack against the military in the northern part of the Caquetá Department, near San Vicente del Caguán.
  - Two policemen wounded during Sunday night in Buenaventura, Valle del Cauca, due to explosive devices thrown by alleged FARC militia members operating in the city.
- September 27:
  - Three army soldiers die in a rebel minefield in Briceño, Antioquia.
  - Four army soldiers wounded in Marquetalia, southern Tolima, located in the municipality Planadas, due to an attack attributed to FARC guerrillas.
- September 28: FARC guerrillas attack police stations in Argelia and El Tambo, Cauca.
- September 29:
  - An unidentified rebel group attack a main oil pipeline in northeastern Colombia. As of 29/9 it remained unclear if the guerrillas were from the FARC or ELN.
  - One army soldier and one FARC member dead due to combat between the 29th front of the FARC and the army in Nariño.
- September 30:
  - Two policemen killed in an attack by the FARC militia in Saravena Arauca. The attack coincided with an ELN attack against a nearby army base.
  - FARC guerrillas burn buses on the main road connecting Boyacá with Casanare Department. This was the second such attack in the month of September, according to El Tiempo.
- October 3: FARC guerrillas are accused of being behind a car bomb attack in Florida, Valle del Cauca.
- October 4 and 5: FARC guerrillas in Cauca continue launching attacks against police stations with mortars and machine gun fire, this time in the municipality of Suárez.
- October 5: 1 soldier killed and 3 soldiers wounded in FARC attack near Fortul, Arauca.
- October 6: FARC guerrillas blow up a car bomb outside of the police station in San Vicente del Caguán, Caquetá.
- October 8: Combat between the army and the Central Bloc of the FARC-EP leaves one soldier and three guerilleros dead.
- October 9: Two policemen wounded in FARC attack in Norte de Santander.
- October 10: FARC militia members kill seven soldiers from the Colombian army in Cauca.
- October 18:
  - Three soldiers from the Colombian army killed, two wounded and one 'missing in action' due to FARC attack in Putumayo, southern Colombia. The FARC members were from the 32nd Front, which together with other FARC Fronts operates in the area.
  - FARC guerrillas bomb an oil pipeline on Putumayo.
- October 21: Between 9 and 10 soldiers from the Colombian army killed near Tumaco, Nariño, as they were ambushed by FARC guerrillas. 6 more soldiers were wounded in the attack. The attack is believed to have been carried out by the Mobile Column Danel Aldana The FARC guerrillas got away with 19 army rifles, a mortar and communications equipment.
- October 22: One soldier killed and three more injured as FARC guerrillas launch attack with explosives in the northern part of the southern Caquetá department.
- October 23: Another 10 soldiers killed, this time in Arauca, eastern Colombia, as their platoon was intercepted by several FARC groups from the 10th Front. In addition to the deaths some 13 army soldiers were wounded. This brings the total death toll on the behalf of the state forces to 21 in the past 48 hours.
- October 23: FARC guerrillas attack an oil pipeline in two different locations in Norte de Santander.
- October 28: Three soldiers from the Colombian army killed and eleven more wounded as they stepped into a minefield planted by FARC guerrillas in the northern part of the Cauca department. The action took place hours after the air force had bombed a presumed guerrilla camp in the area.
- November 2: Three soldiers killed and seven wounded due to combat with FARC guerrillas in the Huila Department, near the regional capital Neiva.
- November 5: One policeman killed due to FARC attack in Jambolo, Cauca. The attack came a few hours after the army and air force killed FARC's top leader Alfonso Cano in the nearby municipality of Suarez.
- November 7: FARC guerrillas attack police station in Putumayo, injuring one policeman with small arms fire.
- November 9: One soldier killed due to FARC attack in Briceño, Antioquia, northern Colombia
- November 17: FARC guerrillas in Briceño and Yarumal (Antioquia) burn buses on the highway connecting with the Caribbean coast.
- November 19: One soldier killed by FARC guerrillas in Planadas, Tolima.
- November 22: FARC guerrillas are alleged to be behind an explosion in a military office in Popayán, Cauca.
- December 4: Six policemen wounded as FARC guerrillas set of a bomb in the city of Neiva, Huila Department.
- December 7: FARC guerrillas from the 13th Front ambush a police patrol in Caquetá, leaving four policemen wounded.
- December 10–12: Several FARC attacks against the police in the northern César department.
- December 11:
  - FARC attacks military base in Meta Department, leaving 4 army soldiers wounded.
  - FARC guerrilla en Tolima launch attack against the military, leaving one soldier and one civilian minor wounded.
- December 12: FARC milicianos install car bomb in Popayán.
- December 18: FARC guerrillas from the Caribbean Bloc attack railways and transport trains in the Caribbean La Guajira department.
- December 22:
  - FARC guerrillas kill two policemen in the Arauca department.
  - FARC guerrillas belonging to the 34th Front kill a high-ranking police chief in Antioquia.
- December 23: Two soldiers killed and one wounded in the northern part of the Antioquia department.
- December 25: Three soldiers wounded in FARC attack in Timbiqui, Valle del Cauca department.
- December 26: One soldier killed and more than six soldiers wounded in FARC attack in the Arauca department.
- December 30: FARC guerrillas attack military aircraft stationed at an airport in Tumaco, Nariño. The FARC members attacked the planes with artillery pieces. The attack did not cause damages.
- December 31: FARC guerrillas attack police station in Suarez, Cauca, with mortars and machine gun fire. Unknown casualties.

== 2010 ==
In 2010 the FARC killed at least 460 members of the security forces, while wounding more than 2,000, according to state statistics.

== 2009 ==
- February 4 and February 11: Nariño massacres kill 27 indigenous Awá people in the Nariño Department.
- November 21: Six people, including two children, were killed when the bus they were riding on was set aflame by a group of suspected FARC rebels.

== 2008 ==
- August 10: An explosion in the north of Colombia's capital Bogotá left ten people wounded. The police blamed the FARC for the attack.
- September 1: Four people were killed and around 26 more were wounded by a car bomb in the Colombian city of Cali in one of the worst urban attacks in Colombia. Police said they believed FARC guerrillas were responsible for the attack.
- October 12: Authorities blamed FARC for two attacks on hotels in the center of Neiva in the south west of Colombia that resulted in the death of one person and the injury of seven others.
- October 23:Police blame FARC for a series of blasts occurring throughout the capital. The explosives had been left in waste bins in six separate residential areas. Witnesses described the blasts as "not high-powered", and the injuries were minor. Six people were injured.

== 2007 ==
- April 9: One person died and 34 others were injured when a bomb was detonated in front of the police headquarters in Cali.
- May 9: Nine police officers were killed by a FARC bomb in Santander province.
- May 10: Bomb kills 10 Colombian soldiers in Valle del Cauca province.

== 2006 ==
- February 26: FARC gunmen killed eight civilians on a bus near the town of Puerto Rico.
- September 29: FARC killed a teacher in rural area of Ituango, Antioquia. Named Augusto Cesar Pareja Lopéz.
- October 19: A car bomb in the parking lot of Bogotá's Nueva Granada military university injured 18 people.

== 2005 ==
- February 1: FARC attacks the Iscuande marine base in Narino Department with gas cylinder bombs smuggled into the barracks with aid of Colombian Marines working with insurgents, killing 15 soldiers and injuring 25.
- February 3: A bridge is blown up in Putumayo Department, killing eight soldiers and a civilian.
- April 6: An ambush in Arauca state, near Venezuela, kills 17 soldiers.
- June 24: FARC attacks military positions in the location of Puerto Asís in the Putumayo Department, killing 25 and wounding 20 in a single operation, one of the biggest attacks since 2000.
- December 17: FARC launches a massive attack in the remote village of San Marino in the Chocó Department, killing at least six police officers along with the temporary abduction of some thirty, before they were released by the guerrillas on December 20 due to military pressure.
- December 28: FARC rebels ambush troops near Vista Hermosa, killing 28.

== 2004 ==
- June 16: La Gabarra Massacre committed by United Self-Defense Forces of Colombia against FARC leaves at least 34 peasants dead.
- August 4: A car bomb killed nine policemen in Andinápolis.

== 2003 ==
- February 7: El Nogal Club bombing kills 36.
- February 14: A bomb blew up a house in Neiva, killing 17 people in what police said was a FARC plot to kill President Uribe. The exploded house was near the airport and under the flight path of the president's plane.

== 2002 ==
- May 2: Bojayá massacre. In seizing the town of Bojayá, Chocó, FARC guerrillas killed 119 civilians.
- August 7: Minutes before Álvaro Uribe is inaugurated as President of Colombia, mortar shells rain down on Bogotá, killing at least 15 and injuring 40.

== 2000 ==
- In October 2000 FARC attacked and raided the town of Dabeida, killing 54 Colombian Army and Police. During a counteroffensive by the Colombian military, the town was retaken by the government's troops at the cost of one UH-60 Black Hawk helicopter, killing all 22 soldiers on board, while another two had to land in nearby military bases due to heavy combat damage.

== 1998 ==
- In March 1998, some 700 FARC fighters ambushed the 52nd counterguerrilla battalion of the Colombian Army's 3rd Mobile Brigade, stationed at El Billar, south of the Caqueta department. The battalion had entered the town of Peñas Coloradas with the objective of damaging the FARC's infrastructure in the lower Caguan river in an area where FARC influence was deep among the population. The beginning of the FARC's attack took place between March 2–4, causing the battalion heavy casualties: some 62 were killed and 43 were taken prisoner, 105 casualties of a total of 154.
- In August 1998 FARC fighters attacked and destroyed another military base in Miraflores in the southern Guaviare.
- In November 1998 FARC launched a military raid against the Mitú department capital near the Brazilian border, which they briefly occupied for three days until Colombian reinforcements arrived after being given permission to use the nearest airbase, which was in Brazil.

== 1997 ==
- On 21 December, FARC militants attacked an army base on the hill of Patascoy, southwestern Colombia, near the border with Ecuador. 11 military were killed and 18 kidnapped.

== 1996 ==
- August 30: the FARC attacked the Las Delicias military base in the Putumayo Department. The Colombian military lost about 54 dead, 15 wounded and 60 captured. A surprise attack had been carried out at night after extensive intelligence gathering, and 15 hours of fighting resulted in the complete destruction of one of the military's rural bases.

== See also ==
- Terrorism in Colombia
- List of violent acts related to the internal conflict in Colombia
