= Timoleón Jiménez =

Colombian politician and former guerrilla

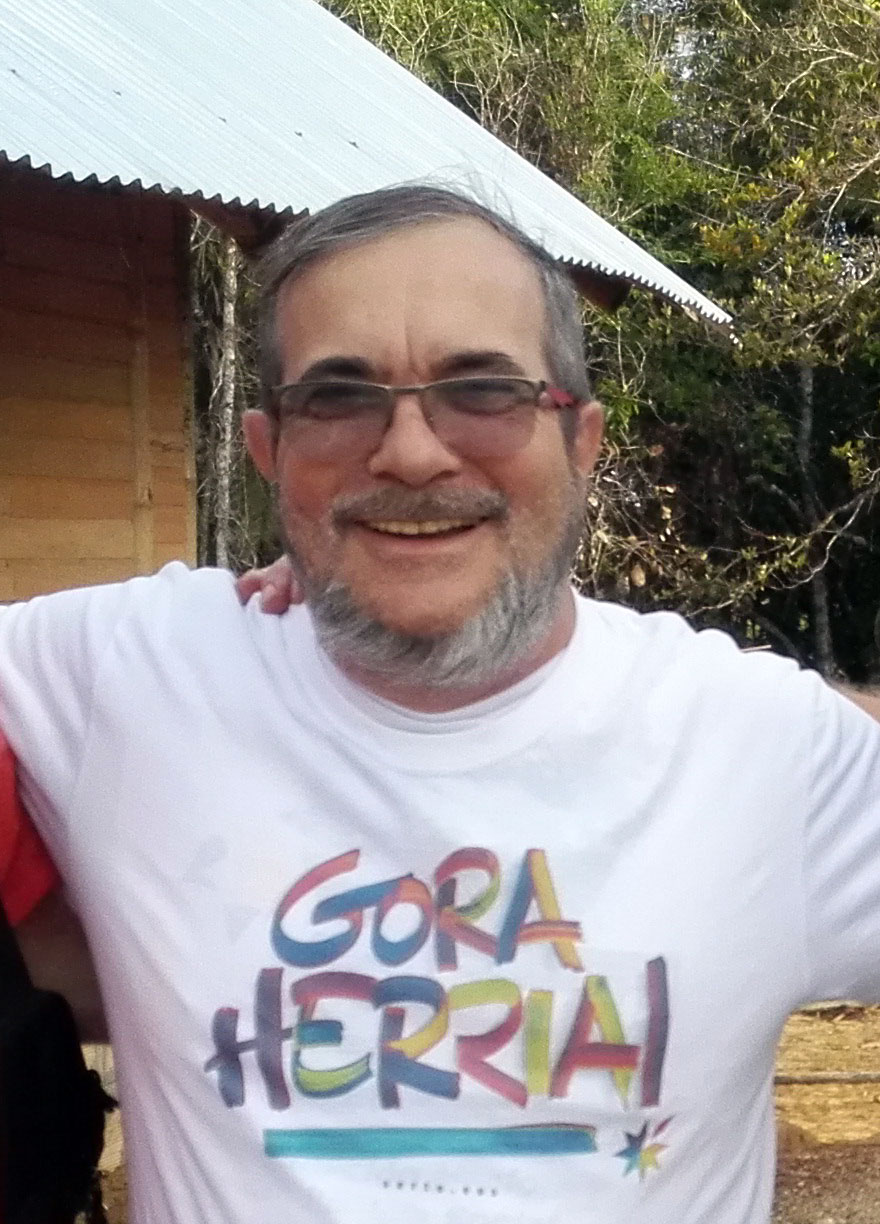

President of Commons
- Incumbent
- Assumed office 1 September 2017
- Preceded by: Position established

Commander-in-Chief of FARC-EP
- In office November 2011 – 27 June 2017
- Preceded by: Alfonso Cano
- Succeeded by: Position abolished

Personal details
- Born: Rodrigo Londoño Echeverri; 22 January 1959 (age 67) Calarcá, Quindío, Colombia
- Party: Commons
- Nicknames: Timoleón Jiménez, Timochenko

Military service
- Allegiance: FARC-EP
- Years of service: 1982–2017
- Rank: Supreme Leader
- Commands: Middle Magdalena Bloc
- Battles/wars: Colombian conflict: Catatumbo campaign

Rodrigo Londoño Echeverri (born 22 January 1959), most known under the nom de guerre Timoleón Jiménez and the nickname Timochenko or Timochenco, is a Colombian politician, cardiologist and former commander-in-chief of the rebel group Revolutionary Armed Forces of Colombia (Spanish: Fuerzas Armadas Revolucionarias de Colombia, FARC), currently serving as the president of its political successor Commons (Spanish: Comunes) following the Colombian peace process.

== Early life ==
Echeverri was born in 1959 shortly after the Cuban Revolution to a poor peasant family in Calarcá, near the birthplace of FARC-EP founder Manuel Marulanda. His father, an illiterate peasant, is a communist sympathiser.

After finishing high school, Echeverri joined the youth wing of the Colombian Communist Party. Colombian intelligence services had long believed that he had studied medicine in Cuba, and the Soviet Union, and then undergone military training in Yugoslavia, but this has since been proven false.

== FARC-EP ==
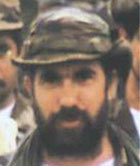
Echeverri during his time in FARC-EP

Echeverri joined the FARC-EP in 1976, at the age of 17. He explains, on his entry into the guerrilla: "Before I left, they gave me a talk in which they tried to discourage me, but I was determined: I admired the armed struggle and believed that it would only take a short time, as in Cuba".

He received medical training within the guerrillas.

=== Commander-in-chief ===
Echeverri took over the FARC-EP leadership in November 2011 from Alfonso Cano after the leader was killed by the Colombian army. According to the Colombian Air Force his alias is referring to Soviet Marshal Semyon Timoshenko. Before assuming the leadership of the guerrilla group, Echeverri was one of the commanders of the Middle Magdalena Bloc of the FARC-EP and was thought to have some 800 men under his command.

Under Echeverri's leadership, from 2011 until the 2016 demobilization, the FARC continued its terrorist activities such as crimes against humanity, including kidnapping of more than 20,000 individuals, children recruitment, forced abortions, sexual violence including against its own militant children, forced displacement, torture, and murder.

=== Peace process ===
According to Foreign Policy, "[Echeverri] was instrumental in keeping the FARC from abandoning" the Colombian peace process, announcing in November 2012 the beginning of dialogue with the Colombian government.

During this time, Echeverri experienced health issues. In 2015, Jiménez suffered a heart attack. In November 2016, the Colombian government and FARC-EP reached a deal, with the FARC-EP transitioning from guerilla status to a political party.

== Political career ==
=== Party foundation ===
In the morning of 2 July 2017, he checked himself into a hospital in Villavicencio after feeling exhaustion and numbness in his arm. Doctors said that he was in intensive care and there was a temporary blockage of blood to his brain.

Between 28 and 31 August 2017, a month after being hospitalized for a cerebral embolism, Echeverri led the founding congress of the Common Alternative Revolutionary Force (FARC) party at the Bogota Convention Centre with the participation of one thousand delegates. In a speech on 1 September 2017, party leader Timochenko proposed a transitional government for the 2018–2022 term. On 31 October 2017, FARC was named a legal political party in Colombia.

=== 2018 Colombian presidential election ===
On 1 November 2017, twenty-four hours after FARC was made a legal political party, Echeverri launched a presidential bid for the 2018 Colombian presidential election. During this time, he had the lowest polling figures among the Colombian public. In March 2018, he was hospitalized for acute coronary syndrome, underwent heart surgery and subsequently ended his presidential campaign.

== Controversy ==
According to the United States Department of State, Timoleon Jimenez set the FARC-EP’s cocaine policies directing and controlling the production, manufacture, and distribution of hundreds of tons of cocaine to the United States and the world, including the "taxation" of the illegal drug trade in Colombia to raise funds for the FARC-EP. According to the U.S. Department of State, in 2000, along with Pastor Alape, he ordered the Magdalena Medio Bloc to retake coca territory, shoot down fumigation aircraft, increase coca production, kidnap United States citizens and kill any farmer who sold cocaine paste to non-FARC-EP approved buyers. When Echeverri took over as leader, the U.S. Department of State offered a reward of up to $5 million for information leading to his arrest and/or conviction.

Military offices
Preceded by Alfonso Cano	Commander-in-Chief of FARC-EP; 2011–2017	Position abolished
Party political offices
New political party	President of Commons; 2017–present	Incumbent
