= Simón Trinidad =

Colombian criminal incarcerated in a US federal prison

- Born: Juvenal Ovidio Ricardo Palmera Pineda; July 30, 1950 (age 76); Valledupar, Cesar; Colombia
- Military career
- Allegiance: Patriotic Union (UP) (until 1987); Revolutionary Armed Forces of Colombia (FARC) (from 1987)
- Service years: UP (1985-1987); FARC (1987-2004)
- Rank: Member of the Central High Command
- Nicknames: "Simón Trinidad" "Federico Bogotá"
- Unit: Caribbean Bloc of the FARC-EP
- Conflicts: Colombian armed conflict

Simón Trinidad (born July 30, 1950) is the alias of Juvenal Ovidio Ricardo Palmera Pineda, a high-ranking member of the former Revolutionary Armed Forces of Colombia (FARC), and reputedly the first high-ranking member of that guerrilla group to be captured. "Simón Trinidad" is currently serving a 60-year sentence in solitary confinement in the United States at ADX Florence "Supermax" prison near Florence, Colorado with a scheduled release date of February 17, 2055.

== Early life ==
Palmera was born into a traditional landowner family in the city of Valledupar in the Colombian northern Cesar Department, on July 30, 1950. Son of Liberal leader Juvenal Palmera and Alicia Pineda de Palmera. He was named Juvenal Ricardo Ovidio Palmera Pineda, with an unusual third name to his name. He is known to have three siblings: two sisters, Leonor and Elsa and a brother, Jaime.

He spent most of his childhood in Valledupar, where he attended middle school classes in the public school Colegio Nacional Loperena, one of the better schools in the city at that time. He also frequented the Valledupar Social Club. Part of his high school education was completed in the Colegio Helvetia in Bogotá. He spent his last two years of schooling in Cartagena, in the Naval School of Cartagena. He then enrolled in the Jorge Tadeo Lozano University, in Bogotá, where he studied Economics. It is frequently said that he also attended Harvard University, where supposedly he completed graduate work in business economics, however he does not speak English as he recognized during an interview in 2012.

After graduation, he returned to Valledupar and started working for the government-owned agrarian savings bank Caja Agraria del Cesar as a financial adviser. During this time he married.

He then started to work for the administrative staff of the Popular University of Cesar and also became part of the academic cadre as a professor of Colombian Economic History in the Administrative Sciences Department. At the same time, he also worked as bank manager for the privately owned Banco del Comercio (Bank of Commerce).

While teaching at the Popular University of Cesar, Palmera, some fellow professors and others became leftists. They perceived that bipartisan Colombian administrations ignored the pleas of the poor peasants in the area for fairer credit and land reform. By September 1981, Palmera, Jaime Sierra, Tomás Agudelo and Federico Palacios Romaña had created a group named Los Independientes (The Independents) of Marxist-Leninist orientation. They also supported the Patriotic Union Party created in 1985. This party was subject to political violence from drug lords, paramilitaries and military agents, leading to the forced disappearances, kidnappings and assassinations of many of its members, while others later became active guerrillas or refugees overseas.

In 1987, after a peasant strike in the Alfonso López plaza in Valledupar, Palmera stole 30 million pesos from the bank where he was working as a manager and escaped into the mountains, apparently joining the FARC at this time. He also took with him financial records that he would later use for extortion and kidnapping of traders and landowners.

== Life in FARC ==
Colombian authorities suspect that Palmera became part of the FARC-EP in 1987, confirming this in 1991. By then he was believed to be in command of FARC's Front 41, created by Palmera in June 1990, which operated in the area of the Serranía del Perijá mountain range. Palmera had adopted the aliases of Simón Trinidad and Federico Bogotá, and later also became part of the Bloque Caribe (Caribbean Bloc of the FARC-EP) in the Northern coast of Colombia.

His area of operations included Valledupar. Despite Valledupar's being a relatively small city, with less than 300,000 inhabitants, kidnappings in the city would rise, eventually becoming the city with the highest kidnapping rate in Colombia,.. Paramilitary groups also began to grow in the region.

In May 1992, Palmera and Abelardo Caicedo (aka "Solís Almeida"), ordered the kidnapping and later the murder of Colombian Navy Lieutenant Álvaro Fernando Morris Piedrahíta. On August 17, 1994, he was assigned to command the Front 19 known as José Prudencio Padilla that operated in the Sierra Nevada de Santa Marta mountains.

On December 11, 1995, Colombian authorities learned that "Simón Trinidad" had become the sixth commander in-line of the FARC's Caribbean Bloc, being in charge of guerrilla propaganda. In November 1996, Colombian authorities discovered that Palmera was now third in the chain of command of the Estado Mayor del Bloque Caribe (Major State of the Caribbean Bloc; the higher command of this bloc).

In 2000, investigators from Human Rights Watch interviewed Palmera in Los Pozos, Caquetá. He was quoted as dismissing international humanitarian law as a "bourgeois concept". On July 4 of the same year, while in San Vicente del Caguán, Caquetá and acting as FARC's speaker, he announced that the group was going to attack any aircraft or troops that performed any fumigation on coca or poppy plantations in southern Colombia.

He continued to participate as a highly visible negotiator during the failed 1998–2002 FARC-Government peace process (1999–2002) held under Conservative President Andrés Pastrana.

== Capture ==
Palmera was captured in January 2004 in Quito, Ecuador, by local authorities and speedily deported to Colombia, where he faced charges for rebellion, the kidnapping and later assassination of Colombian former minister Consuelo Araújo and various other criminal offenses that he allegedly committed, including the extortion or kidnapping of several of his former banking associates, former childhood friends and relatives. His exact rank within the FARC was not made clear by either the rebels or Colombian authorities at the time of his capture.

== Extradition ==
Simón Trinidad being escorted to the plane by Colombian authorities.

In November 2004, the Colombian Supreme Court approved the extradition of Palmera to the U.S., on charges related to the drug trade and money laundering. The extradition would then proceed if President Uribe gave final approval to the move.

In a communique dated November 28 but released on December 3, the FARC declared that Trinidad's extradition would be a serious obstacle to reaching a prisoner exchange agreement with the Colombian government.

On December 17, 2004, the Colombian government authorized Palmera's extradition to the United States, but stated that the measure could be revoked if the FARC released all 63 (political and military) hostages in its possession before December 30.

The FARC did not accept this demand, and Palmera himself had previously stated that he considered his future extradition and prosecution in the U.S. an opportunity to publicly protest against the Uribe administration. As the deadline passed, the Colombian military was placed on high alert, and the U.S. embassy in Bogotá issued a terrorism alert to U.S. citizens in Colombia. The extradition was signed by president Álvaro Uribe and Palmera was placed on a DEA aircraft bound for Florida. "Simón Trinidad" was extradited to the United States in the afternoon of December 31, 2004.

== Trials ==
=== 1st U.S. trial ===
==== Pre-trial ====
In February 2005, Ricardo Palmera appeared before a Washington court for a pre-trial hearing, where he pleaded not guilty to the prosecution's charges of drug trafficking and terrorism. The prosecution had asked for, and received, at least a three-month period for the gathering and translation (if applicable) of the necessary evidence. The legal complexities of the case and the paperwork involved set back the date of the trial for at least six months.

Palmera has also been accused of "hostage taking" because of his alleged complicity in the capture of three U.S. contractors, who crashed while conducting surveillance over rural areas under FARC influence and control. Palmera has been related to this case due to his alleged admission that he had traveled to Ecuador, where he was arrested, in order to arrange for the negotiation of a prisoner exchange with the Colombian government. The defendant argued that such efforts were made under the auspices of the UN. There is apparently no evidence that Trinidad had any personal connection with the plane crash, or the decision to take the US contractors captive. The other "co-defendant" in Palmera's case is the entire FARC organization. Judge Thomas Hogan authorized the publishing in Colombian newspapers of a summons for the FARC organization to appear in court to answer the charges.

The court heard arguments on Palmera's status as a prisoner of war in January. Simon Trinidad's Colombian lawyer testified at the same hearing to rebut FBI claims that he had consented to the interrogation of Mr. Trinidad without the assistance of legal counsel, something totally forbidden in Colombian law. The court has yet to rule on combatant immunity, the admissibility of the alleged confessions to the FBI, and of evidence of other crimes allegedly occurring in Colombia.

After his extradition to the United States, Simón Trinidad was held incommunicado in Washington, D.C., without access to his lawyer.

==== Trial ====
===== Prosecution arguments =====
- Simón Trinidad is part of the Central Command of FARC, and as a high-ranking member he should pay for the crimes perpetrated by the organization.
- Trinidad participated in and/or conspired in the kidnapping of three American citizens in February 2003.
- He is part of the terrorist group that kidnapped the three Americans.
- Trinidad himself admitted at the moment of being captured that he was part of a commission intended to negotiate a prisoner exchange.

===== Defense arguments =====
- Simón Trinidad never participated in the kidnapping because he was chief of the Caribbean Bloc and was in the northern region of the country at the time of the incident.
- He is part of an insurgent organization that is in conflict with the Colombian government.
- The captured Americans were spying on the FARC-EP, making them legitimate targets.
- The testimony given by Trinidad to the Ecuadorian government at the moment of his capture was given under pressure; He did say that he was negotiating a prisoner exchange.

===== Witnesses =====
- Dereck Harvey: Coordinator of the eradication program for which the three kidnapped Americans worked. He testified that the mission objective was part of an anti-narcotics campaign. He admitted that his team sometimes provided intelligence information on FARC positions.
- James Hallaway: Director of California Microwave Systems, a division of the defense contractor Northrop Grumman Corp. He insisted the kidnapped Americans were civilians while Trinidad's Defense argued that their main purpose was to spy on the FARC.
- Colombian Army Colonel: Was the first one to arrive at the crash site of the Americans' gunned down plane. A video was played showing the plane's wreckage, including empty ammunition magazines and uniforms supposedly belonging to the FARC, lying by the dead bodies of American Tom Janis and Colombian Army Sergeant Alcídez Cruz, with signs of execution.
- Colombian National Police Radio operator: Recorded the audio in which members of the Southern Bloc of the FARC-EP's Mobile Column Teófilo Forero celebrated the shooting down of the aircraft.
- Jorge Enrique Botero: recorded the video that proved that the Americans were still alive and in which the FARC took full responsibility for the kidnapping.
- An expert in ballistics from the Colombian Attorney General's Office: Testified that the weapons used to shoot down the plane were used by the FARC.
- An expert in forensics from the Colombian Attorney General's Office: Was in charge of recovering the dead bodies at the crash site and performed the autopsies. He testified that the bodies had been executed with the same type of bullets found at the same location from where the aircraft had been shot down.
- Forensics expert: Reaffirmed that the bodies had been executed with the same type of bullets found at the same location from where the aircraft had been shot down.
- Raúl Salgado: Ecuadorian attorney who interrogated Trinidad in Ecuador, he provided a video of Trinidad confessing he was in Ecuador to promote a prisoner exchange for the FARC, which was used as one of the main pieces of evidence against Trinidad.
- A Colombian Army radio operator: taped an audio recording of the FARC commander known by the alias of "Mono Jojoy in 2002, ordering his guerrillas to kidnap any American in Colombia.
- Alejandro Barbeito: FBI Agent who interviewed Trinidad in Ecuador three times and confirmed Trinidad's statements from the video made in Ecuador. The Defense alleged that his testimony was based on his notes and not on his recollection of the events. Trinidad yelled, "Liar!" at him at one moment of the trial.
- Former employee of the High Commissioner for the Peace Office: said that the FARC were utilizing the people's emotions to promote the exchange, to a point that it has become a constant means of pressuring the government.
- Aka Maria: A former member of the FARC-EP said to be Trinidad's radio operator for nine years. She allegedly heard when Trinidad ordered the kidnapping of Valledupar's former Major Elías Ochoa. When she was questioned, some details of her testimony differed from the ones given in Colombia to local authorities.
- Jina Pagano: FBI expert on the FARC, explained to the Judge the FARC's "Law 002", which threatens civilians and companies with more than a million dollars net worth to pay an extortion fee.
- Colombian citizen: Was a personal friend of Trinidad before he joined the FARC who affirmed he had kidnapped him. His wife also intervened saying she had negotiated with the FARC for his freedom and that she had heard Trinidad's voice in the background talking about the kidnapping.
- Colombian National Police radio operator: Affirmed he had heard Trinidad talking on the radio suggesting that the US fumigation planes ought to be shot at, but admitted that this recording had been lost.
- Colombian National Police radio operator: Talked about an intercepted communication among FARC members on December 31, 2004, the day on which Trinidad was extradited.
- Luis Guillermo Giraldo: Former Senator of Colombia, participated in the FARC-Government Peace Process where he had multiple encounters with Trinidad as a member of the FARC.
- Colombian Army Major: Commanded a military operation in Caquetá Department that almost located numerous kidnapped civilians, among them the three Americans and Ingrid Betancourt. He filmed the base camp where the victims may have been held as well as notebooks proving Trinidad's presence on the site.
- Simón Trinidad: His testimony was considered unusual for many observers due to the nature of this case. He alleged that his reasons for joining the FARC included the assassination of many of his Patriotic Union Party colleagues and the persecution against them by paramilitary militias and Colombian drug cartels. He admitted to the use of kidnappings by the FARC and said that the organization was paying too high a political cost for this practice. He also admitted his role as spokesperson of the organization during the peace process with the government of President Pastrana.

===== Development =====
On October 30, 2006, a former female guerrilla who claimed to operate Trinidad's radio during his time as commander of the FARC's Front 41 in the Sierra Nevada de Santa Marta, testified against him. She said she witnessed Trinidad ordering a subordinate to collect a ransom payment for the kidnapped former mayor of Valledupar, Elías Ochoa, in 1998. She also claimed that:

The instructions that he [Trinidad] gave us were that any gringo, tourist, civilian, or whatever, had to be kidnapped. No one should be able to escape. They were very important for a [prisoner] exchange or because they could be used to get a big ransom.

Her testimony lasted four hours and was expected to continue the next day.

===== Verdict =====
On November 21 of 2006 a mistrial was declared due to a hung jury, which was unable to reach a unanimous verdict. The U.S. prosecution arranged a new trial.

=== 2nd U.S. trial ===
==== Verdict ====
On July 5, 2007 there were initial reports that the second U.S. prosecution attempt apparently had also stalled. After only two days of deliberations, the jury in the re-trial indicated that they too could not reach a verdict. Responding to a juror's note stating that "...at this point we are at an impasse and do not believe that we will be able to reach a unanimous verdict...", U.S. District Judge Royce C. Lamberth told the jurors to resume deliberations.

On July 9, the jurors declared Palmera guilty of the charge of conspiring to hold the three U.S. citizens hostage.

The next day, jurors informed the judge that they could not reach a common verdict on the other four remaining charges, resulting in a partial mistrial. U.S. prosecutors then indicated that they could recommend a lower sentence for Palmera's subsequent conspiracy conviction if FARC released the three Americans unharmed within the next two months.

On January 28, 2008, Palmera was sentenced to 60 years in prison.

== Possible open letter ==
An open letter allegedly sent by "Trinidad" from his imprisonment surfaced on the internet and was posted on leftist websites.

The El Tiempo newspaper reported that U.S. prosecutors in charge of Palmera's case were surprised by the existence of the letter and its publication, since Palmera is held in solitary confinement and his lawyers are prohibited from distributing any information.

Palmera's lawyers denied the letter's authenticity before Judge Tom Hogan during his first U.S. trial, arguing that Palmera was not its real author and blamed the FARC for producing it as a form of political propaganda.

Prosecutors considered that the detailed letter, if in fact it was actually written by Palmera, could constitute a federal crime, which may be used against him in court.

== 3rd U.S. trial ==
In October 2007, Simon Trinidad again achieved a hung jury, in his third month-long trial, this time for involvement in the FARC's drug trafficking activities. According to press reports, a majority of jurors favored acquittal but could not unanimously agree. Prosecutors vowed to put him on trial yet again. In April 2008, Trinidad's fourth trial also ended in a hung jury.

All drug charges against Trinidad were dropped in May 2008.

== Supporters ==
The "National Committee to Free Ricardo Palmera" is an ideologically left-wing organization based in the United States which calls for the release of Ricardo Palmera, ("Simón Trinidad") member of the Colombian FARC guerrilla group. The group considers Palmera to be "one of Latin America's most important leftists," stating that "everyone who is against injustice and who wants to oppose the imperial arrogance of the Bush administration should join [them] in the effort." 14 members of the Committee participated in an October 10, 2006 protest that preceded the beginning of Trinidad's trial.

The "National Committee to Free Ricardo Palmera" states on its website that "[we are] made up of Colombia solidarity activists in the U.S. and around the world. We ask all those who oppose U.S. intervention in Colombia to join us in demanding freedom for Ricardo Palmera."

The Committee supports the FARC's activities in Colombia, describing its leadership as "incorruptible through forty years of struggle" and the rebel group as one that is "fighting for national liberation".
