= Policarpa (disambiguation) =

Policarpa may refer to:

- Policarpa Salavarrieta, heroine of the Colombian independence movement against the Spanish Empire
- Policarpa Salavarrieta, a neighbourhood of the locality of Bogotá Antonio Nariño
- Policarpa Salavarrieta Front, the 23rd front of the Middle Magdalena Bloc of the FARC-EP

== Geography ==
- Policarpa, Nariño, a municipality in the Colombian department of Nariño

== Biology ==
- Polycarpa, a genus of sea squirts
