= Iván Márquez (disambiguation) =

Iván Márquez (born 1955) is a Colombian guerilla leader

Iván Márquez may also refer to:

- Iván Márquez (volleyball) (born 1982), Venezuelan volleyball player
- Iván Márquez (footballer) (born 1994), Spanish footballer
