= Manuel Marulanda =

Leader of the FARC-EP (1930–2008)

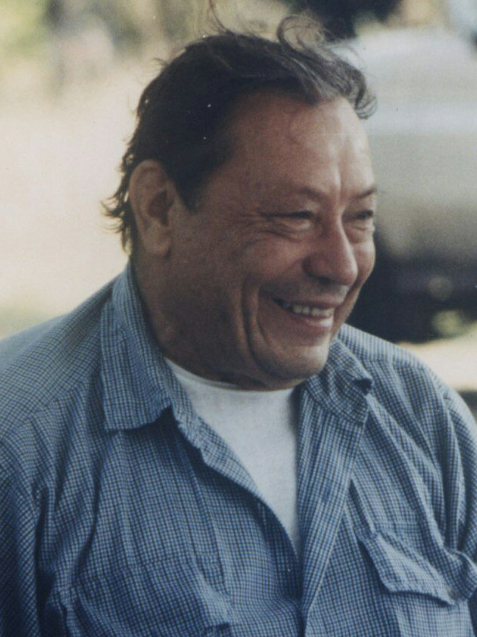
- Born: 13 May 1930; Génova, Quindío; Colombia
- Died: 26 March 2008 (aged 77); Meta Department, Colombia
- Military career
- Allegiance: FARC
- Rank: Secretariat member, Chief of the Revolutionary Armed Forces of Colombia
- Nicknames: Manuel Marulanda Vélez; Tirofijo
- Units: Southern Bloc
- Conflicts: Colombian armed conflict

Pedro Antonio Marín Marín (13 May 1930 [disputed] – 26 March 2008), known by his "nom de guerre" Manuel Marulanda Vélez, was a Colombian militant who was the founder and main leader of the Marxist–Leninist FARC-EP ("Fuerzas Armadas Revolucionarias de Colombia – Ejército del Pueblo"). Marulanda was born in a coffee-growing region of west-central Colombia in the Quindío Department, to a peasant family politically aligned with the Liberal Party during conflicts in the 1940s and 1950s.

Marulanda was nicknamed "Tirofijo" (Spanish: Surefire or Sureshot) by his comrades, apparently because of a reputed ability to accurately aim firearms.

Marulanda himself changed his political and ideological inclinations to the Communist Party (PCC) during "La Violencia" (roughly 1948 to 1958) that followed the assassination of the Liberal Party's leader Jorge Eliécer Gaitán.

In March 2006, Alberto Gonzales, the Attorney General of the United States, announced in conjunction with Drug Enforcement Administration and United States Department of Justice officials that the US State Department had placed a $5 million reward on Tirofijo's head, or for information leading to his capture. But Manuel Marulanda was never apprehended, and died of a heart attack on 26 March 2008. He was replaced as commander-in-chief by Alfonso Cano.

== Early armed activities ==
Marulanda and members of his family, like many Liberal peasants, rose up in arms not long after they heard the news about the death of Jorge Eliecer Gaitan.

Eventually, Marulanda split with some of his relatives and became part of a column of guerrilla fighters that came under the influence of the Communist Party of Colombia, which developed a more proactive role in the fighting, executing more raids and offensive operations. He took on the name "Manuel Marulanda" in honor of a murdered union leader. Marulanda eventually met and befriended Luis Morantes, also known as Jacobo Arenas, a PCC political cadre sent to the rural areas by the central party structure.

Members of this group later settled in an area known as Marquetalia towards the end of "La Violencia", keeping their weapons. They distrusted the Colombian Army and government even after a 1953 coup led by General Gustavo Rojas against Conservative president Laureano Gómez. Rojas had offered an amnesty that was accepted by most Liberal irregular fighters nationwide, but reputedly the murder of a few demobilized individuals made Marulanda, his rural comrades and his PCC superiors in the cities uneasy.

After the fall of Rojas in 1957 and the signing of the National Front agreement in 1958 between Colombia's two main parties, self-sufficient armed enclaves, such as the so-called "independent republics" and in particular a supposed "Marquetalia Republic", were considered dangerous by the new government. Pressure from Conservative members of Congress and from the United States led to a Colombian Army attack on Marquetalia, which was eventually overrun during what was termed "Operation Marquetalia" in May 1964.

== Formation of the FARC ==
The Colombian Army's attack was mostly ineffective, though it did scatter the guerrillas, and most of the survivors reunited elsewhere and later became part of the "Bloque Sur" (Southern Bloc) guerrilla group on 27 May 1964, a precursor to the official foundation of the FARC in 1966. Marulanda and Jacobo Arenas soon established themselves as the main leaders of the new guerrilla group.

== Death ==
Marulanda died of a heart attack on 26 March 2008. The news was first brought by Colombian magazine Revista Semana on 24 May 2008, that cited Defense Minister Juan Manuel Santos saying Marulanda died. The minister claimed he had learned this from a reliable informant within FARC. He also told the magazine that three bombing raids had targeted the rebel chief around the date in question. A press statement released by the Colombian Ministry of Defense on 24 May stated that Marulanda died on 26 March 2008, at 18:30 hours (UTC 13:30). On 25 May in a video released to channel teleSUR, Timoleón Jiménez, aka Timochenko, another member of the Central High Command of the FARC, confirmed the death as heart failure.

== Popular culture ==
- Marulanda is portrayed by the Colombian actor Iván Rodríguez as the character of Miguel Miranda 'Punto-Fijo' in the TV series Tres Caínes.

== See also ==
- The World's 10 Most Wanted
