= Iván Márquez =

Colombian guerilla leader (born 1955)

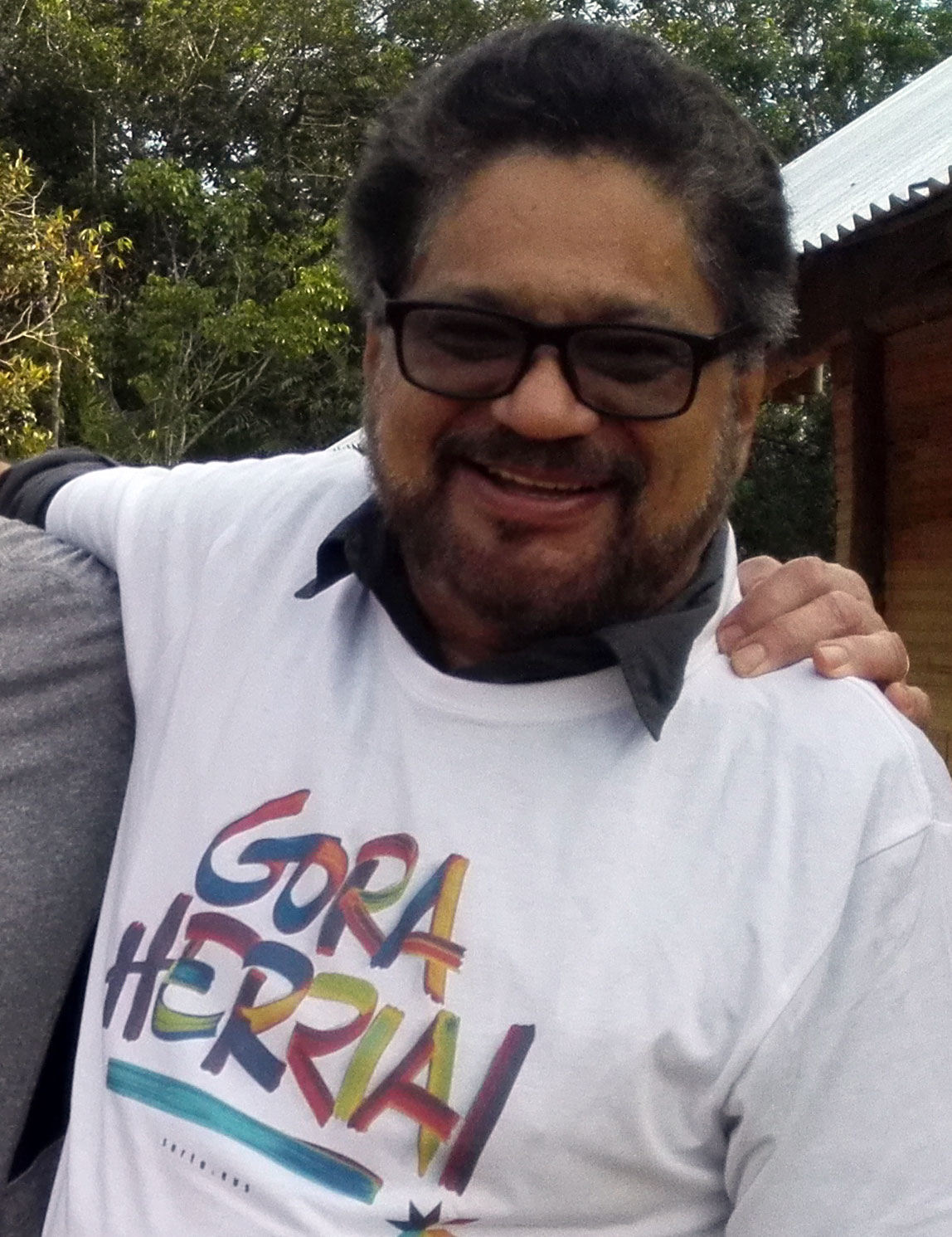
- Márquez in 2016
- Nickname: Iván Márquez
- Born: Luciano Marín Arango; 16 June 1955 (age 71); Florencia, Colombia
- Allegiance: FARC (until 2016); FARC dissidents (from 2019)
- Service years: 1985–present
- Conflicts: Colombian conflict

Luciano Marín Arango (born 16 June 1955), better known as Iván Márquez, is a Colombian guerrilla leader, member of the Revolutionary Armed Forces of Colombia (FARC), part of its secretariat higher command and advisor to the Northwestern and Caribbean blocs. He was part of the FARC negotiators that concluded a peace agreement with President Juan Manuel Santos. On 29 August 2019, Márquez abandoned the peace process and announced a renewed armed conflict with the Colombian government.

== Early years ==
Marín Arango was born in Florencia in 1955. He joined the Colombian Communist Youth (JUCO), the Colombian Communist Party's youth wing, in 1977. Between 1977 and 1979 Marín Arango (Marquez) was a teacher in biology at the school 'Corazón Inmaculado de María' in El Doncello, Caqueta. He was described as a calm disciplined teacher and requested from his students to talk for 15 minutes on the current problems of Colombia. Sometimes he also presented the students with books from Friedrich Engels, Karl Marx or Mao Zedong and handouts on left wing politics. He would also organize meetings where Marxist ideologies were discussed.

He would later move on to Cartagena de Chaira and onwards to Florencia in Caquetá. In Florencia he was elected a member of the municipal council.

== Patriotic Union career ==
As a result of peace talks with the Colombian government, Marín Arango became part of the leftist Patriotic Union (UP) party, coordinating the UP's activities in Caquetá Department. Marín Arango first served as councilman and then as congressman in the Colombian Congress representing Caquetá. In 1986 he became a member of the Colombian Parliament for UP, but in October 1987 he left Bogotá and went to Casa Verde in La Uribe on orders from the FARC leader Jacobo Arenas. According to El Tiempo, the presidential candidate of the UP Jaime Pardo Leal was murdered the same day, Márquez left Bogotá.

The UP party was subjected to persecution by different paramilitary groups, drug lords and death squads that saw the party as a threat as the political branch of the FARC.

== FARC membership ==
Luciano Marín Arango, adopting the alias "Iván Márquez", became a political commissar for FARC's 14th Front in 1985.

== FARC commander ==
By 1988, Márquez had left the UP and returned to FARC as bloc commander, overseeing activities in the departments of Huila, Caquetá and Putumayo. By the end of the 1980s, he was a member of the secretariat of the FARC.

After the 1990 death of Arenas, Márquez joined the secretariat, the highest command of the organization. During the mid-1990s, he was transferred to Colombia's northwest in order to reorganize FARC forces after paramilitary attacks.

In 2008 documents obtained from the computer of slain FARC chieftain Iván Ríos revealed that Márquez also led FARC's efforts to raise support in universities and high schools though "the creation of two student federations, some academics and other secondary officials, and by the infiltration of already existing university movements" [Colombian DAS intelligence director María del Pilar] Hurtado told Spanish news agency EFE.

=== FARC negotiator ===
Márquez was a FARC negotiator during the 1999–2002 failed peace process between the FARC and the government of Andrés Pastrana.

==== Humanitarian exchange ====
In November 2007 Márquez was sent to Venezuela to meet with President Hugo Chávez. At the time, Chávez was mediating between the government of Colombia and the FARC to agree on a deal to liberate the hostages held by the FARC and the liberation of some 500 guerrillas imprisoned by the government of Colombia, after years of combat in the Colombian armed conflict.

=== Peace agreement ===
Since 2012, Márquez took part in peace negotiations with the Government of Juan Manuel Santos in Havana, Cuba. In August 2016 he signed a peace agreement with the Colombian Government on behalf of the FARC. The Colombian negotiator was Humberto de la Calle. The peace agreement was announced in a ceremony in Cuba. The agreement would have provided him with a seat in the Colombian Senate but he eventually did not run in the elections.

== Leader of the Segunda Marquetalia ==
Márquez took up arms anew after his nephew was arrested and extradited to the United States. In 2019, he eventually appeared as the leader of the Segunda Marquetalia, a group of FARC dissidents. The group had about 1000 active members. On 30 June 2022, an attack on Márquez life was made by a group suspected to be of the 'Gentil Duarte' front of the FARC dissidents. Márquez was accompanied by a security detail of about twenty militia members at the time of the attack in Caicara del Orinoco in Venezuela. According to El País, Márquez lost an arm during the attack.

== U.S. State Department allegations and bounty ==
According to the U.S. Department of State, Márquez oversaw loading of planes carrying 600–1200 kilograms of cocaine and the receipt of money and automatic weapons as payment. The State Department also alleged that Márquez established the FARC's policies for directing and controlling the production, manufacture, and distribution of hundreds of tons of cocaine to the United States and the world; the "taxation" of the drug trade in Colombia to raise funds for the FARC. The U.S. Department of State is offering a reward of up to $5 million for information leading to his arrest and/or conviction

== Reports of death ==
Iván Márquez was reported dead in July 2022, by the Government of Iván Duque after an assassination attempt by a group of mercenaries in Venezuela. A few days later, the Segunda Marquetalia announced that Márquez was not dead but in a hospital. It was reported that Márquez died on 6 July 2023 in a hospital in Caracas, Venezuela, where he was receiving medical treatment for injuries he received in an assassination attempt in June 2022. However, in August 2023, Marquez denied reports of his death in an audio recording. In 2024, the Government of Gustavo Petro stated that they were investigating the claim that he had died in Venezuela.

== Personal life ==
In the 1990s, his mother and sister were abducted by Colombian paramilitary forces, but were eventually released. His nephew Marlon Marín became a witness to the US prosecution in an investigation on drug trafficking against the FARC leader Jesús Santrich.
