= Northwestern Bloc of the FARC-EP =

The Northwestern Bloc of the Revolutionary Armed Forces of Colombia, also known as the Iván Ríos Bloc has historically been a strong influence in the Medellín and Antioquia regions, and still is today. It has been among the blocs most seriously targeted by former president Álvaro Uribe's defense plan and the Colombian Army's offensive. Due to this, the bloc has been forced to retreat to more remote areas of the countryside and has lost the dominance it once had in the area. The specific divisions of the group are arguable. Because of the current conflict existing in the country, much of the information recovered is conflicting. Some of the believed divisions or "fronts", as they are commonly called, are shown below. Many of these fronts sometimes work together towards a certain mission, while others are further divided into "columns" and "companies" with a smaller number of members. For more general information see FARC-EP Chain of Command.

== Commanders ==
Alias	Name	Note
Isaías Trujillo	Luis Carlos Úsuga Restrepo	Bloc commander.
Iván Márquez	Luciano Marín Arango	
Jesus Santrich	Seusis Hernández	

== Columna móvil Mario Vélez ==
This mobile column is composed of around 300 members. It operates mainly in el Nudo de Paramillo, Yarumal, Valdivia and Anorí.

Alias	Name	Note
Remorado		Column commander.

== 5th Front ==
Also known as the Antonio Nariño Front, this front is composed by up to 350 combatants and operates mostly in the Urabá region of the Antioquia Department.

Alias	Name	Note
Jacobo Arango		Front commander. Killed on January 31, 2012.
Jacobo	Luis Carlos Durango Úsuga	Arrested in 2003.
"La Muerte" or "Hermes"	Héctor Elías Úsuga Higuita	Killed in April 2011.
"Ramirito"	Ramiro Antonio Montoya Moreno	Ringleader, killed in November 2011.

== 9th Front ==
Also known as the Atanasio Girardot Front, this front is composed 45 to 50 combatants and operates mostly in the Antioquia Department. The Colombian military claims that this front has now been dismantled but NGO Nuevo Arco Iris said in 2012 the front is still active

Alias	Name	Note
Danilo	Iván de Jesús Zuluaga	Killed in 2009
Gabriel		Second in command
Salomón		Third in command
Alonso, Chamizo	Tulio Murillo Ávila	Arrested in 2005.
Caliche	Virgilio de Jesús Guzmán	Demobilized in 2006.
David	Sebastián Hernández Giraldo	Arrested on February 14, 2011.
"Elicier" or "El Diablo"	Gabriel Arcangel Galvis Montoya	Second-in-command. Killed on July 16, 2012.

== 18th Front ==
This front is composed by up to 150 combatants and operates mostly in the Córdoba Department.

Alias	Name	Note
Manteco	Jóberman Sánchez Arroyabe	
Román Ruiz		Front commander

== 34th Front ==
Also known as the Alberto Martínez Front, this front is composed by up to 250 combatants and operates mostly in the Chocó and Antioquia Departments.

Alias	Name	Note
Pedro Baracutado	Ancízar García	Commands 34th front
El Paisa	Jesús Agudelo Rodríguez	Killed in 2008.
Amparo		Killed in July 2010.
Modesto	Ramón Antonio Duarte Borja	Captured in July 2010.
Elian		Ran away from FARC (March 2011) with his wife alias "Elizabeth".
Elizabeth		Ran away from FARC (March 2011) with his husband alias "Elian".

== 36th Front ==
This front is composed by up to 160 combatants and operates mostly in the Antioquia Department.

Alias	Name	Note
"Ánderson" or "Carranza"		Front commander
Dúber	Rubén Darío Pérez Contreras	Killed in 2008.
Argemiro, El Zurdo	Martín Francisco Puerta Henao	Captured in 2005.
Tres Pelos	Héctor Alfonso Villalobos	Killed in 2003.
Guacharaco	Juan Bautista Peña Serna	Killed in April 2010.
Pechi		Demobilized in August 2010.
Jaimes		Demobilized on October 26, 2010.
El Pájaro	Jesús Morales Morales	After being wounded, he handed himself to the army on February 8, 2011.
Samper	Alberto Montoya Montoya	Captured by Interpol in April 2011.
Shampoo		Financial leader and explosive expert. Killed in August 2011 along with two others guerilleros.

== 47th Front ==
Also known as the Leonardo Posada Pedraza Front, this front is composed by 15 to 90 combatants and operates mostly in the Caldas and Antioquia Departments. The front is, as of 2011, mainly active in the border between southern Antioquia and Caldas, with limited, if any, activity in other departments.

Alias	Name	Note
Kadafi		
Karina	Nelly Ávila Moreno	Demobilized in 2008.

On May 19, 2008, Karina surrendered herself to the Colombian authorities, two weeks after president Uribe guaranteed her safety on her surrender. According to the governor of Antioquia, Luis Alfredo Ramos, she was also urged by her family to surrender.

== 57th Front ==
This front is composed by up to 250 combatants, and operates mostly in the Chocó Department.

Alias	Name	Note
Benkos		2d in command.
El Becerro		Commander 57th Front, escaped bombing in 'operation darién'
Silver		Killed on October 3, 2010, in Operation Darien

== 58th Front ==
Also known as the Mártires de las Canas Front, this front is composed by up to 150 combatants and operates mostly in the Antioquia and Córdoba Departments.

Alias	Name	Note
Manteco	Jóberman Sánchez Arroyabe	

== Jacobo Arenas Urban Front ==
This urban front is considered FARC's greatest influence in the Medellín region.

Alias	Name	Note
Ramiro, Político		Killed in 2006.
Octavio	Rolando Acevedo Muñoz	Killed in 2005.

== Raúl Eduardo Mahecha Front ==
Operates in Antioquia. In September 2011 this front is believed to have rescued three oil workers who were kidnapped by criminals in August 2011. The guerrillas freed the workers and handed them over the Colombian police.

== Columns and Companies ==
The following columns and companies also form part of the Northwestern Bloc:

- Company Aurelio Rodríguez: Composed by up to 110 combatants, this company operates in the Risaralda and Caldas Departments and is led by Martín Cruz Vega, alias "Rubin Morro". One of its highest ranking militants, Jesús González Cardona, alias "Osama", was captured in 2007.
- Company Héroes y Mártires del Cairo operates in the Antioquia Department.
