= Central Bloc of the FARC-EP =

The Central Bloc of the Revolutionary Armed Forces of Colombia operated strategically in the Andes Mountains, around the middle of Colombia. The group was considered as the largest threat to Bogotá and its economy, as it operated in areas surrounding the capital. Strong military action in the 2000s, however, forced the bloc to hide in remote parts of the mountains, away from many highways and cities.

The specific divisions of the group are arguable.bSome of the believed divisions or 'fronts', as they were commonly called, are shown below. Many of these fronts sometimes worked together towards a certain mission, while others were further divided into 'columns' and 'companies' with a smaller number of members. For more general information see FARC-EP Chain of Command.

== Commanders ==
Alias	Name	Note Source:
Marlon		Bloc commander
Jerónimo	Raúl Duarte	
Jerónimo Galeano	Arquímedes Muñoz Villamil	Killed on March 20, 2011
Alfonso Cano	Guillermo León Saenz Vargas	Traditional ideological figure and commander in chief. Killed in action.
"Simón Bernate"	Leonardo Chaux Hernández	One of the trusted men of alias "Jerome Galeano" and alias "Alfonso Cano". He was 3rd leader of the "Miller Salcedo" company, and in the last four years he was the political head of the Central Bloc. Captured in April 2011.
"El Abuelo"	Alirio Rojas Bocanegra	Killed on June 2, 2011. He was security chief for alias "Alfonso Cano". In the same operation by the Colombian Army also was killed alias "Laura", a woman radio operator for alias "El Abuelo".

== 16th Front ==
The 16th Front was responsible for the personal security of Alfonso Cano until he left the front in September 2011 and, together with a small group of 15 guerrillas, started moving south through Huila and Cauca. It had around 300 members in 2011.

Alias	Name	Note
Alfonso Cano	Guillermo León Saenz	Killed on November 4, 2011

== 17th Front ==
Also known as the Angelino Godoy Front, it was composed by around 150 militants as of 2011. It operated mostly in the Huila Department. The leader of this front was José Orlando Orlando Ortiz, alias ‘Héctor Comidita’ Two members of the front died and 5 others surrenders after clashes with the Colombian army, on August 1, 2012.

Alias	Name	Note
Héctor Comidita	José Orlando Orlando Ortiz	
"Geovany", "Gringo"		Captured in 2005.
"Rigo", "Paisa"	Rigoberto Zuluaga Moncada	Killed in May 2010.
"Jeimmy"	Diana Cortés	Killed in May 2010.
"Robinson"	Angelino Godoy	Killed in October 2011.

== 21st Front ==
Also known as La Gaitana Front, it was composed by up to 120 militants. It operates mostly in the Tolima and the Quindío Departments.

Alias	Name	Note
Didier	Luis Fernando Mendez	considered to be 'the mastermind of extortion' in the Tolima region. Killed in January 2011
El Tío		Front commander
Giovanni		Second or third in command
Jennifer		Killed in January 2011
Riano		Killed in January 2011
Robinson		Alleged explosive expert. Captured in January 2011
Marlon	Eduardo Rayo	
Pedronel	Abel Tavera	
Donald		
	Maria Rubiela Rubio Gualtero	Captured in March 2011
Miro	Argemiro Cuellar Mendoz	Captured in March 2011
Carlos Pulgas		Third in command, killed in October 2011

== 25th Front ==
Also known as the Armando Ríos Front, it was composed by up to 120 militants. It operated mostly in the Tolima Department. It was responsible for several attacks against security forces in 2011 in the Huila and Caqueta departments. In July 2011, 9 members of the front were arrested and 2 others killed by security forces. Six other members were captured on October 12.

Alias	Name	Note
Camilo		Front leader. Killed in March 2012.
"Bertil"	Enelio Ganoa	KIA in 2008.
"Tito"	Víctor Muñoz	
"Arcadia"	Albeiro Garcia	Main leader, captured in July 2011.
"Gonzalo"	Antonio Jimenez	Alleged chief financial officer, captured in July 2011.

== 50th Front ==
Also known as Cacique Calarcá Front, it was composed by up to 80 militants. It operated mostly in the Quindío and Risaralda Departments. The front was announced to have been dismantled by the Colombian Army in 2010.

Alias	Name	Note
Enrique	Ciro Gómez Rayo	Killed in March 2010.

== 66th Front ==
Also known as the Joselo Lozada Front, it was composed by up to 150 militants. It operated mostly in the Huila Department.

Alias	Name	Note
Mario		Second in command, captured in March 2011.
Davier		Part of Mario's security ring, killed in March 2011.
Libardo, El Pollo		Killed in September 2007.
El Indio Humberto		Killed in March 2007.
Eliecer		Killed in April 2010.
Araceli		Wounded in combat and captured on July 18, 2010.
Didier, Víctor		Captured on July 28, 2010.
Eduardo		Captured on July 28, 2010.
Anuar		Wounded in combat and captured on July 28, 2010.
Santiago	Jaiber López Aldana	Killed on October 9, 2010.
	Fredy Quina Pinzón	Killed on October 9, 2010.
Vladimir		Killed on November 12, 2010.

== Columns and Companies ==
The following columns and companies were also part of the Central Bloc:

- Column 'Alfredo González'. Operated in the southern part of the Tolima department. It was led by alias 'Teófilo'. In June 2011 the column killed a Colombian soldier while losing its 4th in command 'Arnulfo' in combat.
- Column Daniel Aldana: This column was widely known in the Tolima Department, where most of its operations took place. Its financial director, known as "El Indio" was captured in 2005. In 2006, its last known leader Gustavo González López, alias "Rambo", was killed by government troops. In April 2013, 13 members of the column were arrested
- Column Héroes de Marquetalia: This column also operated in the Tolima Department and was led by a female, Magaly Grannobles, alias "Marleny Rondón" and "Mayerly", killed on July 11, 2010, in Operation Berlín.
- Column Jacobo Prías Alape: This column also operated in the Tolima Department and was led by two people known as "Calderón" or "Chicharrón", and "Tribilín".
- Company Tulio Varón: Also known as the Front Tulio Varón, it operated in the Tolima Department. Its leader, Eduardo Fajardo, alias "Walter", was killed in March 2007. Its preceding leader, Roberto Olaya Caicedo, alias "El Venado", was killed in late 2006. It has since been dismantled and fused with the Column Jacobo Prías Alape.
