= Western Bloc of the FARC-EP =

The Western Bloc of the Revolutionary Armed Forces of Colombia was the smallest of the Revolutionary Armed Forces of Colombia's (FARC) blocs in size, although not in military capability. It was often held responsible for attacks that occurred in Cali and the surrounding area. The specific divisions of the group are arguable. Some of its divisions or fronts, as they were commonly known as, are shown below. Many of these fronts worked together at times towards a certain mission, while others were further divided into columns and companies with a smaller number of members. For more general information, see FARC-EP Chain of Command.

== Commanders ==
Alias	Name	Note
Marco Aurelio Buendía	Luis Alfonso Guevara Álvarez	Killed in 2003.
Pablo Catatumbo	Jorge Torres Victoria	
Gustavo López Gómez, "Pacho Chino"	Miller Munar Munar	

== 6th Front ==
The 6th Front was also known as the Hernando González Acosta Front. It was composed of 400 to 500 people as of 2011. It operated mostly in the Cauca and Valle del Cauca Departments.

Alias	Name	Note
Sargento Pascuas, "Humberto"	Miguel Ángel Pascuas	One of the founders of the guerrilla in 1964, Front commander.
Rubén		Operational commander
El Zorro	Oscar Ivan Gugu	One of the 'leaders' of FARC's 6th Front. Captured in January 2012.

On September 19, 2008, heavy fighting occurred between the Colombian Army and the FARC's sixth front during an attack on Toribío, Cauca Department. On April 27, 2013, 17 members of the front were captured while they attempted to steal a helicopter from the Colombian Armed Forces.

== Mobile Column Alonso Cortés ==
The Mobile Column Alonso Cortés, composed of up to 50 men, operated in the same area as the 6th Front.

Alias	Name	Note
El Mocho	Ricardo Morales	Second in charge of the Mobile Column Alonso Cortés. Arrested in February 2011
"El Paisa" or "William"	Carlos Mario Cardona León	Captured in April 2011.

== 8th Front ==
The 8th Front was composed by up to 80 men and operated mostly in the Cauca Department and along the Pacific coast.

Alias	Name	Note
Ramírez	N/A	Killed in 2006, apparently by ELN.
Yesid	Arlex Porras Gómez	Captured in 2006.
"El Rojo"		Captured in 2003.

== 29th Front ==
The 29th Front was composed of up to 250 men and operated mostly in the Nariño Department. It included the mobile column Daniel Aldana, which operated in the Tumaco area. In late April 2013, 13 alleged members of the column were captured.

Alias	Name	Note
Aldemar, Jhon Jairo		
Anuar	Orlando Cardozo	Captured in 2005.
Camilo, Ricardo	Jairo Cuarán Collazos	Abandoned FARC in 2003 and found exile in Chile.

== 30th Front ==
Also known as the José Antonio Páez Front, the 30th Front was composed of up to 300 people. It operated mostly in the Cauca and Valle del Cauca Departments. The front led drug trafficking activities in the areas near the Yurumanguí River, and it was responsible for multiple attacks against civilians on Colombia's Pacific coast. In March 2011, 10 guerillas were killed by the army and 5 others were captured. On October 2, 2011, 3 guerillas were killed and 2 were captured. On February 11, the 30th front attacked an army base, killing 3 and injuring 18 members of the Colombian army.

Alias	Name	Note
Mincho	Jorge Neftali Umenza Velasco, or Herminsul de Jesús Velasco	1st commander. Killed in a bombardment in October 20, 2011
Jefferson	Jaime Renteria Mosquera	Commander of a special unit of the 30th Front. Demobilized in December 2011 with 9 others guerrillas of the 30th Front
Freddy	Luis Eduardo Prada González	

Mobile column Miller Perdomo forms a part of this front.

== 60th Front ==
The 60th Front was composed of up to 60 men and operated mostly in the Cauca Department.

Alias	Name	Note
"El Grillo"	Gilberto Arroyabe	
"Arturo"	N/A	Killed in 2006.

== Mobile Column Jacobo Arenas ==
The Mobile Column Jacobo Arenas was composed of up to 300 men and operated mostly in the Cauca Department. The column is suspected of an attack which killed six soldiers on February 9, 2009.

Alias	Name	Note
Caliche, Floresmiro Acosta	Carlos Patiño killed in 2013	
'Eladio'		Killed in 2009
Kinkón	Carlos Duval Ilipio Dizú	Captured in 2006.

== Mobile Column Arturo Ruiz ==
The Mobile Column Arturo Ruiz was one of the FARC's elite units, among its most notorious operations is the kidnapping of the Valle del Cauca deputies on April 11, 2002.

Alias	Name	Note
Arley	Yurgen Villamizar	Captured in 2010

== Mobile Column Gabriel Galvis ==
The Mobile Column Gabriel Galvis operated in Valle del Cauca. It had 110 fighters or more as of 2011.

== Mobile Column Víctor Saavedra ==
The Mobile Column Víctor Saavedra operates in Valle del Cauca and, especially, in the mountains east of Tuluá.

== Urban Front Manuel Cepeda Vargas ==
The Urban Front Manuel Cepeda Vargas was composed by up to 50 men and was one of the FARC's strongest factions in Cali.

Alias	Name	Note
El Enano		Chief of militias in Cali
Narices	Iván Cárdenas Carrillo	Killed in 2010
Santiago	Gustavo Arbeláez Cardona	Arrested in 2008.
J.J.	Milton Sierra Gómez	Killed in 2007.
Farid, Rafael	Gabriel Antonio Carvajal	Captured in 2005.
"Miller Chacón" or "El Médico"		KIA in May 2011.
