= Alfonso Cano =

Colombian revolutionary (1948–2011)

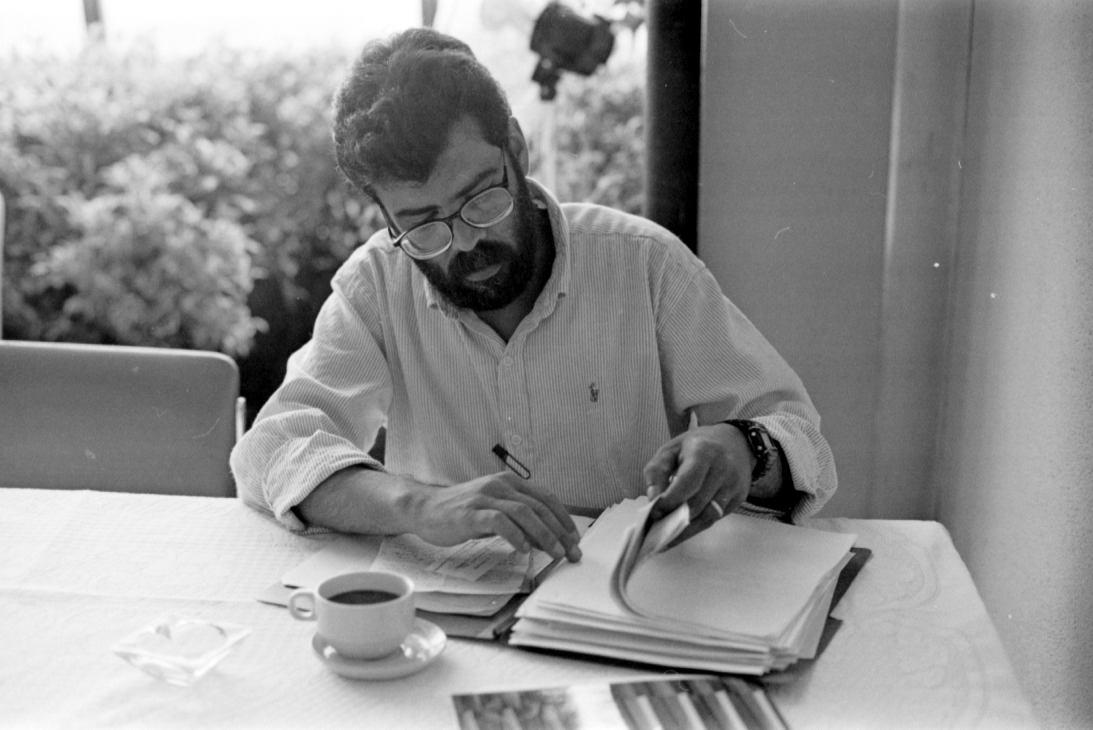
- Born: Guillermo León Sáenz Vargas; 22 July 1948; Bogotá, Colombia
- Died: 4 November 2011 (aged 63); Suárez, Cauca, Colombia
- Military career
- Allegiance: FARC
- Rank: Chief of Staff of the Revolutionary Armed Forces of Colombia
- Nickname: Alfonso
- Commands: Western Bloc
- Conflicts: Colombian armed conflict

Guillermo León Sáenz Vargas (22 July 1948 – 4 November 2011), more commonly known by his nom de guerre Alfonso Cano, was a Colombian guerrilla leader, and commander of the militant group known as Revolutionary Armed Forces of Colombia (Fuerzas Armadas Revolucionarias de Colombia, FARC). He succeeded founder Manuel Marulanda (alias Sureshot, in Spanish: Tirofijo) in March 2008 and commanded the Marxist rebel group until being killed in action by the Colombian Army.

== Early life ==
Born into an upper-class family in Bogotá, Cano began his studies in anthropology at the National University of Colombia in 1968, where he became a member and leader of the Communist Youth. He was arrested by Colombian police directed by Rodrido Avendaño, layer of the moment who carried an investigation because of communist suspicions. It was there that he met members of FARC, who invited him often to lecture about Marxism for a number of guerrilla columns. He dropped out of university to join the group and devoted himself to political activism. Ideologically he was described as a hardliner, with the belief that his ideas and side would ultimately win.

== Joining FARC ==
During the late 1970s Cano is believed to have joined FARC, where he quickly rose through the ranks, working with the group's co-founder and chief ideologue, Jacobo Arenas. His main role was originally to serve as a sort of political commissary for the urban network of the guerrilla in Bogota, and in 1978 he was appointed chief of finances for the Central High Command. A search warrant on his apartment, where he lived with his first wife (Maria Eugenia) and son (Federico), ended in his arrest in 1981 and imprisonment in the La Modelo Penitentiary, where he founded a library. He was freed in 1983 as a result of the amnesty offered by the government of president Belisario Betancur.

He soon moved to the mountains to join the guerrilla soldiers, but instead of active combat he was sent to Casa Verde, the headquarters of the FARC commanders, in La Uribe (Meta), where he was recognized as an intellectual and as such was part of a number of peace dialogues with the government. His main role was to encourage the growth of the Coordinadora Guerrillera Simón Bolívar, a movement to join all guerrillas operating at the time in Colombia. With communism's collapse in Europe in 1989, Cano argued that the Soviet model had failed, and the FARC should develop its own model based on national ideas, whose paradigmatic figure was to be Simon Bolivar.

After Arenas' death in 1990, Cano succeeded him, joining the seven-member Secretariat that led the group, and remaining as the second in command for about two decades. He was chief negotiator during failed peace talks in 1991 and 1992. However he had little role in the long running 1999–2002 FARC–Government peace process with the government of Andres Pastrana. Pastrana later said that Cano never attended the peace talks. In 2000, Cano founded and became the leader of the Clandestine Colombian Communist Party.

== Leader of FARC ==
On 26 March 2008, Manuel Marulanda Vélez, the founder and leader of FARC, died of a heart attack and Cano succeeded him as commander-in-chief. During the same month two other members of the Secretariat, Raul Reyes and Ivan Rios, were killed in action. In July 2008, the Colombian Army rescued fifteen of FARC's highest-profile hostages, including Íngrid Betancourt, in Operation Jaque, further weakening the rebels' position.

As commander in chief, Cano spread his views about the guerrillas, and the nature and solution to the political conflict in Colombia. He believed that the conflict was a class struggle, and that it should be the rich and multinational companies that should fund the war, encouraging blackmailing and kidnapping of politicians and the rich. Mass kidnappings were used to press the government into exchanging hundreds of guerrilla members in jail. The most outstanding example of this practice was the kidnapping of 12 deputies from the Valle del Cauca department, an action that he coordinated with Pablo Catatumbo.

== Drug trafficking charges ==
Cano was wanted in the United States on drug trafficking charges, and the U.S. State Department had offered $5 million for his capture.

== Death ==
On 6 March 2008, the Miami Herald stated that the national daily El Tiempo had reported troops were pursuing Cano, and he was believed to have been wounded in a 21 February helicopter attack. This attack on Cano took place on the border of the two departments of Tolima and Valle del Cauca, rainy weather hampering the effort.

Cano was shot and killed by army forces on 4 November 2011 in the southwestern Cauca Department in what the Colombian government dubbed "Operation Odysseus." President Juan Manuel Santos confirmed his death on television, claiming the Colombian army dealt the FARC "the biggest blow in the history" of the guerrilla organization. The FARC leader's death came months after he fled his stronghold in the south of Tolima, being pursued by armed forces since. FARC responded to Santos' plea to lay down arms by saying that it would continue its fight against the government.

== See also ==
- Terrorism in Colombia
- Drug trafficking in Colombia
- FARC
