= Joaquín Gómez (guerrilla) =

Colombian guerilla leader

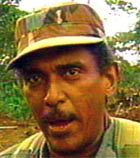
- Born: 18 March 1947 (age 79); Barrancas, La Guajira; Colombia
- Military career
- Allegiance: Revolutionary Armed Forces of Colombia
- Rank: Secretariat member, Bloc commander
- Nicknames: "Joaquín Gómez" "Usuriaga"
- Conflicts: Colombian conflict: Catatumbo campaign

Milton de Jesús Toncel Redondo a.k.a. Joaquín Gómez, a.k.a. Usuriaga (born 18 March 1947), is a Colombian former guerrilla Block Commander, member of the Revolutionary Armed Forces of Colombia (FARC) commanding the Southern Bloc of the FARC-EP.

== Biography ==
Gomez was born in the northern La Guajira department in 1947, where he joined a local branch of the Colombian Communist Party during his teenage years. After the assassination of several of his comrades by paramilitary groups, Gomez left Colombia to study agricultural science in the Soviet Union. On his return to Colombia in the early 1980s, Gomez enrolled as a teacher at the University of Amazonas in Florencia, the capital of the Caqueta province. In 1981 Gomez joined the FARC.

== Wanted by authorities ==
According to the US Department of State Gómez has participated in setting and implementing the FARC’s cocaine policies directing and controlling the production, manufacture, and distribution of hundreds of tons of cocaine to the United States and the world; the "taxation" of the drug trade in Colombia to raise funds for the FARC. Toncel is also responsible for overseeing the Southern Bloc’s production of thousands of tons of cocaine. The U.S. Department of State is offering a reward of up to $2.5 million for information leading to the arrest and/or conviction.

== Member of the Secretariat ==
After the death of Raul Reyes on 1 March 2008 a website affiliated to the FARC called Agencia Bolivariana de Prensa announced on 4 March 2008 that Joaquín Gómez was to replace Reyes as member of the Secretariat or higher command of the FARC.

== Reports of Hospitalization in Venezuela ==
On 8 March 2008 the Colombian army reported that Gómez, along with one other FARC member, had been hospitalized at a clinic in Rubio, Venezuela after being shot in the face near the Colombian border. However, these reports were denied by military sources.
