= Fabián Ramírez =

Jose Benito Cabrera Cuevas
- Born: July 6, 1963 (age 63); El Paujil, Colombia
- Citizenship: Colombian
- Organization: FARC-EP
- Wanted by: Department of State, Colombian National Army

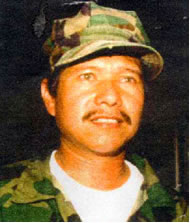

Jose Benito Cabrera Cuevas, also known as Fabián Ramírez, (born 6 July 1963) is a Colombian former guerrilla leader and member of the higher command of the Revolutionary Armed Forces of Colombia (FARC). He was born in El Paujil, Caqueta.

Until 2004, he was the FARC's 14th Front Commander. He is a member of the Estado Mayor and the second-in-command of the Southern Bloc of the FARC-EP. According to the United States State Department, he is responsible for over one thousand tons of cocaine production and managed all aspects of the drug trade for the Southern Bloc. Also according to the United States government, he ordered the round-up of more than 50 people for violating FARC cocaine policies and the murder of many of them. According to the US government, he participated in setting and implementing the FARC's cocaine policies directing and controlling the production, manufacture, and distribution of hundreds of tons of cocaine to the United States and the world; the "taxation" of the drug trade in Colombia to raise funds for the FARC; and the murder of hundreds of people who violated or interfered with the FARC's cocaine policies. The US Department of State is offering a reward of up to US$2.5 million for information leading to his arrest and/or conviction of him.

It was believed that Ramírez was killed in an air strike against a FARC camp in November 2010, although the army could neither confirm his death nor locate his body. Ramírez's survival was confirmed in July 2012 when he appeared in an interview with British journalist Karl Penhaul.
