= Southern Bloc of the FARC-EP =

Columbian Marxist–Leninist guerrilla group

The Southern Bloc of the FARC-EP was the first bloc of the Revolutionary Armed Forces of Colombia to exist and is where the roots of the guerrilla movement lie. The bloc has been held responsible for several notorious attacks, including the infamous "donkey-bomb", numerous attacks against military bases, as well as Íngrid Betancourt´s kidnapping. It was also blamed by government investigators and prosecutors for the bombing of the El Nogal club. FARC itself denied that any of its members were responsible for the attack.

The bloc operates in much of the area that borders with Ecuador and Peru, with some supposed incursions into foreign territory. The government suspects that many FARC leaders may be hiding in the jungles protected by the South Bloc.

The specific divisions of the group are arguable. Because of the current conflict existing in the country, much of the information recovered is conflicting and cannot be taken as absolutely reliable. Some of the believed divisions or 'fronts', as they are commonly called, are shown below. Many of these fronts sometimes work together towards a certain mission, while others are further divided into 'columns' and 'companies' with a smaller number of members. For more general information see FARC-EP Chain of Command.

== Commanders ==
Alias	Name	Note
Joaquín Gómez, "Usuriaga"	Milton de Jesús Toncel Redondo	
"Fabián Ramírez"	José Benito Cabrera Cuevas	
"Sonia"	Anayibe Rojas	Captured and extradited in 2004.
Jairo Martinez		4th in command of this bloc

== 2nd Front ==
Also known as the Isaías Pardo Front, up to 120 militants form it. It operates mostly in the Nariño Department and the Caquetá Department.

Alias	Name	Note
Ovidio Matallana	Bladimir Ballén Garzón	

== 3rd Front (dismantled) ==
Up to 100 militants form this front that operates mostly in the Caquetá Department and the Huila Department. Its current leadership is unclear.

Alias	Name	Note
"Montoya"	Hernando Medina	Killed in 2005.

== 13th Front ==
Up to 150 militants form this front that operates mostly in the Caquetá Department and the Huila Department.

Alias	Name	Note
"Caballo"	Alexánder Duque	

== 14th Front ==
Up to 250 militants form this front that operates mostly in the Caquetá Department. It is considered one of the most important fronts of the Southern Bloc.

Alias	Name	Note
Fabián Ramírez	José Benito Cabrero Cuevas	Commander of the Southern Bloc.
Faiber		Captured in 2005.

== 15th Front ==
Also known as the José Ignacio Mora Front, around 300 militants and 2,000 non-combatants form it. It operates mostly in the Caquetá Department. The group is considered responsible for Íngrid Betancourt´s kidnapping. In March 2012, the group was held responsible for taking a French journalist, Roméo Langlois, as an hostage during an attack in which 4 Colombian soldiers were killed. Langlois was released a month later.

Alias	Name	Note
Wilmer		Front commander
"El Mocho César", "César Arroyabe"	Josué Ceballos	Killed in 2002.
Adiela		Demobilized in August 2010.
"La Flaca"		Demobilized on October 26, 2010.
"Colacho"		Second in charge of this front. Killed in April 2011.
"Diomédez" or "Diomedes"		He participated in the kidnapping of Ingrid Betancourt in 2002. Killed in April 2011.

== 32nd Front ==
Up to 170 militants form this front that operates mostly in the Putumayo Department and the Caquetá Department.

Alias	Name	Note
"Robledo"	Humberto Caballero Cortés	
Arley Leal	Regulo Leal	Captured in 2007.

== 48th Front ==
Also known as the Antonio José de Sucre, up to 450 militants form it. It operates mostly in the Putumayo Department. The group is very active in the border with Ecuador and was suspected of sheltering Raúl Reyes before his death in a Colombian cross border raid on 01 March 2008.

On September 19, 2010, the National Police reported the death of more than 20 guerrilla combatants from this front.

On November 15, 2010, 17 body of suspected FARC members were recovered after Colombia Forces carried out a bombing in FARC 48th front. Two suspected member were children, probably kidnapped by FARC: 12-year-old Jimmy Lee, a Colombian refugee in Ecuador, and 15-year-old Doris Carolina Cadena Benarcazar, an Ecuadorian citizen from Carchi Province. Ecuador denounces the recruitment of Ecuadorean minors into the ranks of Colombia's FARC guerrilla group.

Alias	Name	Note
Robledo		Front commander
"Danilo"	Fabio Ramírez Artunduaga	Captured in Ecuador on June 27, 2011.
"Édgar Tovar"	Ángel Gabriel Lozada	Killed in 2010
"Uriel"	Nelson Yaguará Méndez	Captured in Ecuador in 2005.
"Eliseo"		Demobilized in April 2010.
"Saúl"		Demobilized in July 2010.
"Domingo Biojó"	Sixto Antonio Cabaña Guillén	Killed in 2010 among the deaths reported by the Police on 2010.09.19.
"Lucero","Lucero Palmera"	María Victoria Hinojosa	Killed in 2010 among the deaths reported by the Police on 2010.09.19.
"John Freddy Pitufo"		Killed in 2010 among the deaths reported by the Police on 2010.09.19.
"Caballo"		Killed in 2010 among the deaths reported by the Police on 2010.09.19.
"Segundo Cuéllar"		Killed in 2010 among the deaths reported by the Police on 2010.09.19.
"Oliver Solarte"		Killed on March 14, 2011, during Operation "Marte" (Mars)
"Julián Conrado", "El cantante"	Guillermo Enrique Torres Cueter	Captured in Venezuela on Monday May 30, 2011.
"Euclides"		Killed in September 2011.
"Marihuano"	Jhon Erlinton Pianda Dovicamo	Explosive expert, captured on April 27, 2012.
"El mexicano"	Justo Galindo Reina	Former member of 32nd and 49th front, captured on April 27, 2012.

== 49th Front ==
Around 50 to 100 militants form this front that operates in the Cauca and Caquetá Departments.

Alias	Name	Note
El Mojoso	Wilson Peña Maje	Front commander
Poncho		Demobilized in August 2010.
"Rubín Castañeda"	Héctor Alirio Quintero Ríos	Captured on September 2, 2011.

== 61st Front ==
Also known as the Timanco Front, up to 70 militants form it. It operates mostly in the Huila Department.

Alias	Name	Note
"Águila Negra"	Bercelio Castro	Arrested in 2007.
"Franklin"		
"El Flaco"		

== Mobile Column Teófilo Forero ==
As of 2013, at least 220 specialized militants form this powerful group that operates mostly in the Huila Department and the Caquetá Department, with much urban activity around the country.

Alias	Name	Note
"El Paisa"	Óscar Montero	
"Diván"		Second in command.
"Genaro"		KIA in 2008.
"Genaro"	Luis González or Genaro Corredor Pinzón	Captured on Thursday April 21, 2011.
"Tropezón" or "Edgar"	Junior Lozano Urrea	Deputy of alias "Genaro" (captured in 2011/04/21). Killed in April 2011.
"Jecko"		Captured on Thursday April 21, 2011.
"La Marrana"		Captured on Thursday April 21, 2011.
"Yerbas"	Humberto Valbuena Morales	Captured in 2006.
"Ledis"; "woman of a thousand faces"	Mónica Echeverry	Captured in May 2010.
"Dilmer"	Alfonso Solano Rincón	Killed on February 5, 2011.
"Pedro"	Herminsul Arellán Barajas	Captured in March 2011.
"El ingeniero"	Aldemar Soto Charry	Main explosive expert of the Column Teófilo Forero. Captured in April 2011.

== Mobile Column Yesid Ortiz ==
According to the Colombian newspaper El Tiempo, the Yesid Ortiz Mobile Column was created by fusing remnants of the Teofilo Forero Mobile Column, the 3rd and 14th fronts into a single group which were weakened by the Military of Colombia as part of the Plan Patriota. The main objective of this unit according to El Tiempo is to recover lost territory in the Department of Caqueta.

== Medical Commission ==
Alias	Name	Note
"Cristian" or "Doctor agujas"	Heberto Sánchez Tamayo	Physician. Coordinator of the care for the rebels in Southern and Eastern Blocs. Captured on September 24, 2011.
