= Iván Ríos =

Colombian guerilla (1961–2008)

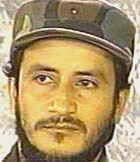
- Iván Ríos
- Birth name: José Juvenal Velandia
- Born: 19 December 1961
- Died: 3 March 2008 (aged 46)
- Allegiance: FARC

Iván Ríos (born José Juvenal Velandia; 19 December 1961 – 3 March 2008), also known as Manuel Jesús Muñoz Ortiz, was head of the Central Bloc of the Revolutionary Armed Forces of Colombia (FARC-EP) and the youngest member of this guerrilla's Central High Command.

Ríos was born in San Francisco, Putumayo, Colombia.

== Death ==
Ríos was killed by his security chief, Pablo Montoya, on 3 March 2008 in a mountainous area of the western department of Caldas. Colombian military forces were involved in an operation to capture Ríos, when a FARC member calling himself "Rojas", on 6 March 2008, delivered a severed right hand, a laptop computer and an ID to the troops. "Rojas" claimed that they belonged to Ríos, whom he described as his boss. Pablo Montoya claimed to have killed Ríos three days earlier. Fingerprint results proved that the hand did belong to Ríos, resulting in the Colombian authorities going to recover the body.

== See also ==
- 2008 Andean diplomatic crisis
- Raúl Reyes
