= Pablo Catatumbo =

Colombian politician

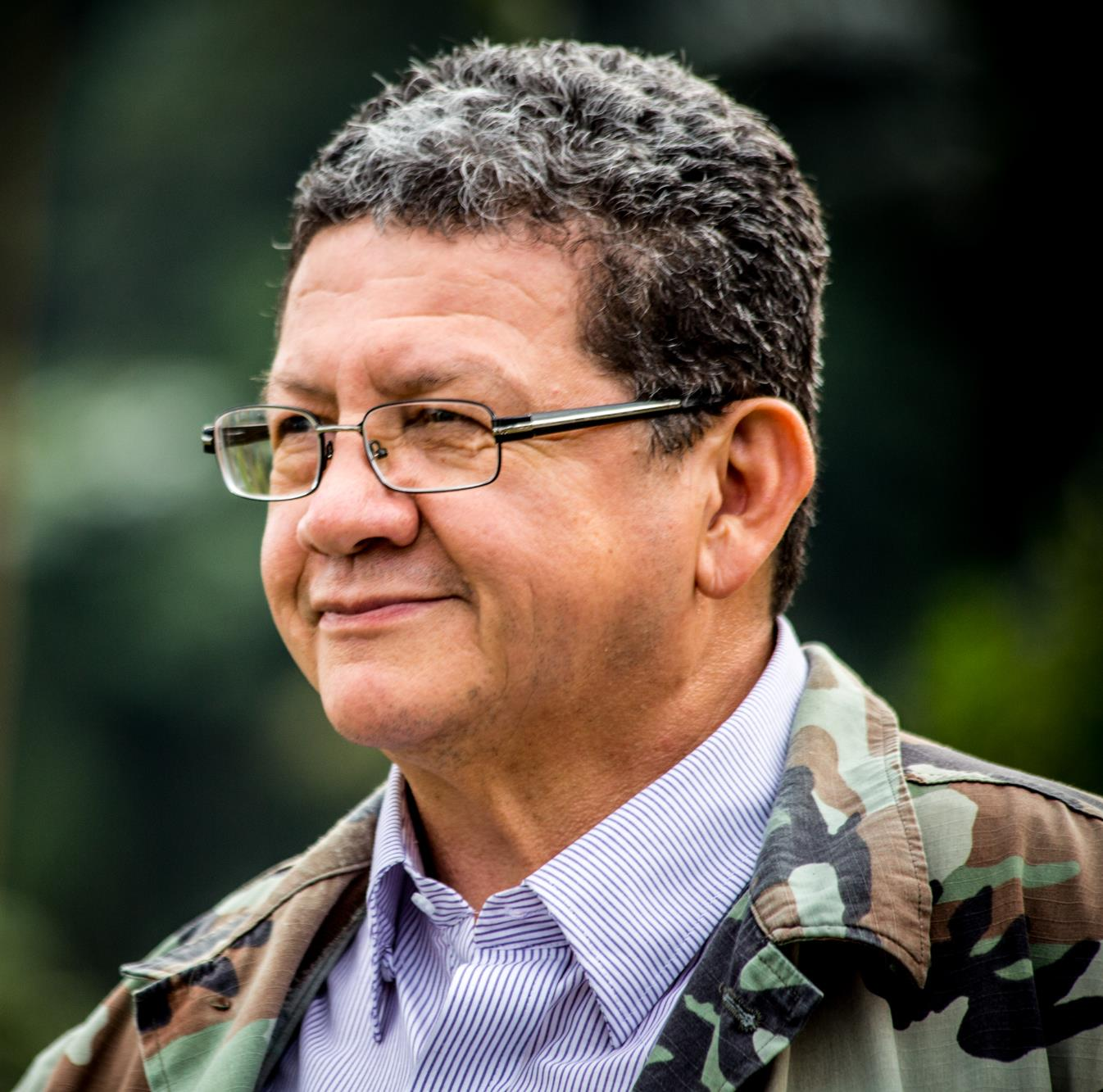

Senator of Colombia
- Incumbent
- Assumed office 20 July 2018

Personal details
- Born: 19 March 1953 (age 73) Cali, Colombia
- Party: FARC
- Profession: Politician

Pablo Catatumbo Torres Victoria (né Jorge Torres Victoria, born 19 March 1953) is a Colombian politician. A former guerrilla leader of the Revolutionary Armed Forces of Colombia (FARC), he was part of their secretariat, FARC's higher command. Catatumbo took command of several FARC fronts in Chocó and Valle del Cauca in the 1990s, after which they grew in size and became strong enough to fight the paramilitary group AUC in the region.

== Life at war ==
In 1967 he became a member of the Colombian Communist Party, and in 1968 he became a member of the Colombian Communist Youth. The organization invited him to take part in a course located in the outskirts of Moscow, in a Soviet Union institute dedicated to the teaching of Marxist–Leninist ideology. The Colombian delegation included future FARC top leader Guillermo León Saénz, and future Patriotic Union congressman Leonardo Posada.

His first action as a guerrilla was in 1973 during an attack in the town of Colombia, Huila. In 1976 he was named head of the FARC's 26th Front, and in 1979 he became the leader of the 6th Front. He was a spokesman during the 1992 peace talks in Tlaxcala, Mexico. In that same year he became a member of the State General Staff of the FARC. His sister, Janeth Torres Victoria, was assassinated in 1997 by orders of paramilitary leader Carlos Castaño.

He was a leading spokesman for the FARC in their peace negotiations with the Colombian government in Havana, Cuba. After the group's demobilization, Catatumbo joined the newly created Common Alternative Revolutionary Force political party, becoming one of the five appointed senators of the party, following the terms of the Havana negotiations.
