= Middle Magdalena Bloc of the FARC-EP =

The Middle Magdalena Bloc of the FARC-EP (Spanish: Bloque Magdalena Medio) was a FARC-EP bloc, notable for its involvement in the conflict with the AUC until the latter's demobilization in 2004. After that, it became one of the Colombian army's biggest worries as FARC started once again to gain control over the territory.

The specific divisions of the group are arguable. Some of the believed divisions or 'fronts', as they were commonly called, are shown below. Many of these fronts sometimes worked together towards a certain mission, while others were further divided into 'columns' and 'companies' with a smaller number of members. For more general information see FARC-EP Chain of Command.

== Commanders ==
Alias	Name	Note
Pastor Alape	Félix Antonio Muñoz Lascarro	
"Juan Carlos"		Killed in 2006.

== 4th Front ==
It was composed by up to 100 combatants and operated mostly in the Antioquia Department (Municipalities of Zaragoza, Segovia, Remedios, Amalfi, Vegachí, Yalí, Yondó and Maceo).

Alias	Name	Note
"Nicolás"		Murdered in 2006.
"Juan"		Handed himself in and demobilized in August 2010.
"Edward"		Handed himself in and demobilized in August 2010.
"Deisy"		Handed himself in and demobilized in August 2010.
"Andrea"		Handed himself in and demobilized in August 2010.

== 11th Front ==
Also known as the José Antonio Anzoategui Front, it was composed by up to 60 combatants and operated mostly in the Boyacá Department. Its leader, who also commanded the 23rd front, was killed in combat in 2006.

Alias	Name	Note
"Wálter"		Killed in 2006.

== 12th Front ==
Also known as the José Antonio Galán Front (named after José Antonio Galán), this front was composed by 90 combatants and was mostly active in the 1980s, giving "protection" to the large emerald dealers of the country.

Alias	Name	Note
"Nicolas"		Killed in 2008.

== 20th Front ==
This front was composed by up to 190 combatants and operated in Bolivar, Cesar, Santander, and Norte de Santander Departments. On April 12, 2013, the leader of the front, alias Fabián Brazo surrender to the military. On April 24, alias Amalia, member of the front, is captured. After this two captures, the 20th front was declared by the Colombian authorities dismantled.

Alias	Name	Note
Dumar o Chatarra		Front leader.
Leonardo Patiño	Nestor Arturo Hincapié	Killed in 2006.
Ernesto 45	Nelson Sierra Rivera	Killed in 2004.
Diomedes, El Guajiro	José del Carmen Hoyos Macías	Arrested in September 2010.

- Includes the 29 de Mayo Company, which was also under the leadership of Ernesto 45.

== 23rd Front ==
Also known as the Policarpa Salavarrieta Front, it was composed by up to 60 combatants and operated mostly in the Santander and Boyacá Departments. Its leader, who also commanded the 11th front, was killed in combat in 2006. By 2012, the Front was almost dismantled, with only 5 combatants forming it.

Alias	Name	Note
"Wálter"		Killed in 2006.
"Nelsón"	Carlos Peñalosa Medina	Killed in 2005.
"the Butcher of Landazuri" or "Chaparro"	Carlos Iván Peña Orjuela	Arrested in September 2009.

== 24th Front ==
It was composed by up to 200 combatants and operated mostly in the Santander and Bolívar Departments. In July 2012, 4 members of the front were killed by the army, while one other was captured and one other surrender.

Alias	Name	Note
"Iván Vargas"	Jorge Enrique Rodríguez	Arrested in 2004. and extradited to the United States.
"Rubiel Colorado"		Killed in April 2010.
"Erica"		Killed in April 2010.
"Dubán","Duván"		Killed in April 2010.
"Pipón"	Israel Díaz Hernández	Arrested in April 2011.

== 33rd Front ==
Also known as the Mariscal Sucre Front, it was composed by up to 250 combatants and operated mostly in the Norte de Santander Department. Eleven of its members were killed on October 10, 2011. On May 10, 2012, they killed seven members of the Colombian army, near the city of Tibú. Around 10 members, including the front leader, were killed on September 4 and 3, 2014, during a military operation.

Alias	Name	Note
El Negro Eliécer		
"Rubén Zamora"		
"El Boyaco"		Killed in June 2010
"Danilo Garcia"	Jose Epimenio Molina	Front leader. Killed in September 2012.

== 46th Front ==
It was composed by up to 90 combatants and operated mostly in the Santander Department.

Alias	Name	Note
Fidel Romero	Rafael Rojas Zuñiga	Turned himself in and demobilized in 2003.

== South Unit ==
Referred to in Spanish as Unidad Sur, it operated in the Santander and Boyacá Departments.

Alias	Name	Note
"Juan Carlos"		Killed in 2006.

== Columns and Companies ==
The following columns and companies also were part of the Middle Magdalena Bloc:

- Mobile Company Ricardo Franco: Operated in the Santander and Antioquia Departments.
- Company Miguel Francisco Estrada: Operated in the Santander Department.
- Company Luis Alberto Berrío Vélez: Operated in the Santander Department.
- Company Raúl Edo Mahecha: Operated in the Bolívar Department.
- Company Míller Chacón: Operated in the Santander Department.
- Company 29 de Mayo: Operated in Santander and Norte de Santander departments.
- Company Gerardo Guevara: Regarded as the "Special Forces" of the FARC in this area of Colombia.

Alias	Name	Note
"Jimmy" or "Pispo"		Killed in April 2011.

- Pamplona Ocana García Rovira Unit: Operated in the Santander Department.
