= Omaira Rojas Cabrera =

Anayibe Rojas Valderrama, also known as Omaira Rojas Cabrera (nom de guerre: Sonia), was born in Palestina, Huila Department, Colombia, on 16 June 1967. She comes from a low-income peasant family and had only completed two years of middle school before joining the FARC guerrilla by the late 1980s.

== Capture ==
She was captured by the Colombian Military on 10 February 2004 in a location called Peñas Coloradas, jurisdiction in the Municipality of Cartagena de Chairá and was taken to the Larandia AB to be interrogated mainly about the three Americans the FARC had kidnapped and about FARC's Secretariat. She was later transferred to many other locations for security reasons.

== Extradition ==
The United States accused "Sonia" of directly negotiating illegal drugs deliveries to Peruvian and Brazilian drug traffickers. Sonia was handed over to U.S. officials on 9 March 2004 at Ernesto Cortissoz International Airport in northern Colombia. She was extradited in 2005.

== U.S. trial ==
On 20 February 2007, Sonia was convicted of drug charges in a Washington D.C. court, marking the first time that an accused member of the FARC was found guilty in a U.S. court.
