= Pastor Alape =

Colombian communist

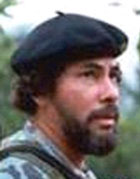
- Born: 4 June 1959 (age 67); Puerto Berrío, Antioquia; Colombia
- Military career
- Allegiance: Revolutionary Armed Forces of Colombia
- Rank: Secretariat member, Bloc commander
- Nicknames: Pastor Alape; Félix Antonio Muñoz Lascarro

José Lisandro Lascarro, also known as Pastor Alape or Félix Antonio Muñoz Lascarro (born 4 June 1959) is a Colombian former guerrilla leader, member of the Revolutionary Armed Forces of Colombia (FARC) and was part of their high command known as the Estado Mayor Central which had some 30 to 60 members.

== FARC activity ==
According to the United States government, Muñoz-Lascarro oversaw the production of the Magdalena Medio Bloc’s cocaine supply, participated in setting and implementing the FARC’s cocaine policies directing and controlling the production, manufacture, and distribution of hundreds of tons of cocaine to the United States and the world the "taxation" of the drug trade in Colombia to raise funds for the FARC. Muñoz-Lascarro was responsible for providing the Secretariat and Estado Mayor with billions of pesos each month. He has ordered acts of violence (bombings and murders). The U.S. Department of State is offering a reward of up to US$2.5 million for information leading to his arrest and/or conviction. On 27 September 2010 the FARC said Mono Jojoy had been replaced on its ruling secretariat by Muñoz-Lascarro.
