= Jacobo Arenas =

Colombian guerrilla/ideological leader (1924–1990)

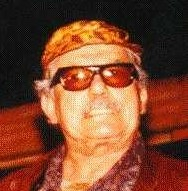
- Jacobo Arenas, political leader of FARC-EP.
- Born: 23 January 1924
- Died: 10 October 1990 (aged 66)
- Military career
- Branch: FARC
- Service years: 1964–1990
- Rank: Founder and Ideological Leader of FARC-EP
- Nickname: Jacobo Arenas
- Conflicts: Colombian armed conflict

Jacobo Arenas ("nom de guerre" of Luis Alberto Morantes Jaimes, 23 January 1924 – 10 August 1990) was a Colombian guerrilla leader of the Revolutionary Armed Forces of Colombia (Fuerzas Armadas Revolucionarias de Colombia, FARC).

== Importance to FARC ==
Jacobo Arenas was an influential figure in FARC and their operations. Arenas operated on both the political and operations side of FARC. Acting as both an ideological figurehead as well as an operations leader Arenas was monumental in FARC's notoriety.

Much of FARC's early political strategy was a result of Jacobo Arenas' work in the Seventh Guerilla Conference. One of the leaders of the Seventh Guerilla Conference, Arenas put forward his plan for FARC to take control of the Colombian government. His plan was to mobilize FARC members to grow support within the Colombian cities for politicians that were sympathetic to FARC or furthered their political agenda. Arenas believed that this city based strategy would be a catalyst to create the conditions for revolution. The strategy drew from the events of La Violencia which would help FARC take power. Arenas strategy also shifted to more aggressive tactics that involved surrounding and sieging cities and actively engaging with enemies.

As the war against the guerillas in Colombia was heating up, many guerilla groups started to raise funds by getting involved in the narcotics trade. Jacobo Arenas, along with other FARC leaders, rejected this idea believing that narco-trafficking was damaging to FARC's ideals and message. FARC would continue to involve themselves into the drug trade ignoring the advice of Arenas.

In 1984 the Colombian government wanted to attempt a peace deal with FARC. As peace negotiations began Jacobo Arenas was appointed as the leader for FARC in the National Peace Commission. FARC and the Colombian government agreed to el Acuerdo de la Uribe on March 28, 1984 which amongst other agreements, allowed for the creation of FARC's first political party, Union Patriotica, Patriotic Union in 1985. The peace deal failed two years later due to anti-communist para-military groups executing Patriotic Union leadership and members.

== Death and aftermath ==
Jacobo Arenas died on 10 August 1990, possibly due to cancer, but perhaps also due to diabetes or an ulcer, or even assassinated by a vindictive comrade (according to different versions). The death of Arenas was never completely replaced as the ideological leader of FARC which caused FARC to lose much of their political goals. FARC transitioned heavily into the narcotics trafficking part losing much of their political goals in the process.

Arenas' son, known as Francisco Arenas, continued to serve in the FARC after his father's death. He eventually led the Jacobo Arenas Front mobile column, named in honor of his father.

Alfonso Cano subsequently became Arenas' replacement as ideological leader of the group throughout the 1990s, and served as the leader of the FARC-EP from May 2008 to November 2011, when he was killed.
