= Kidnappings in Colombia =

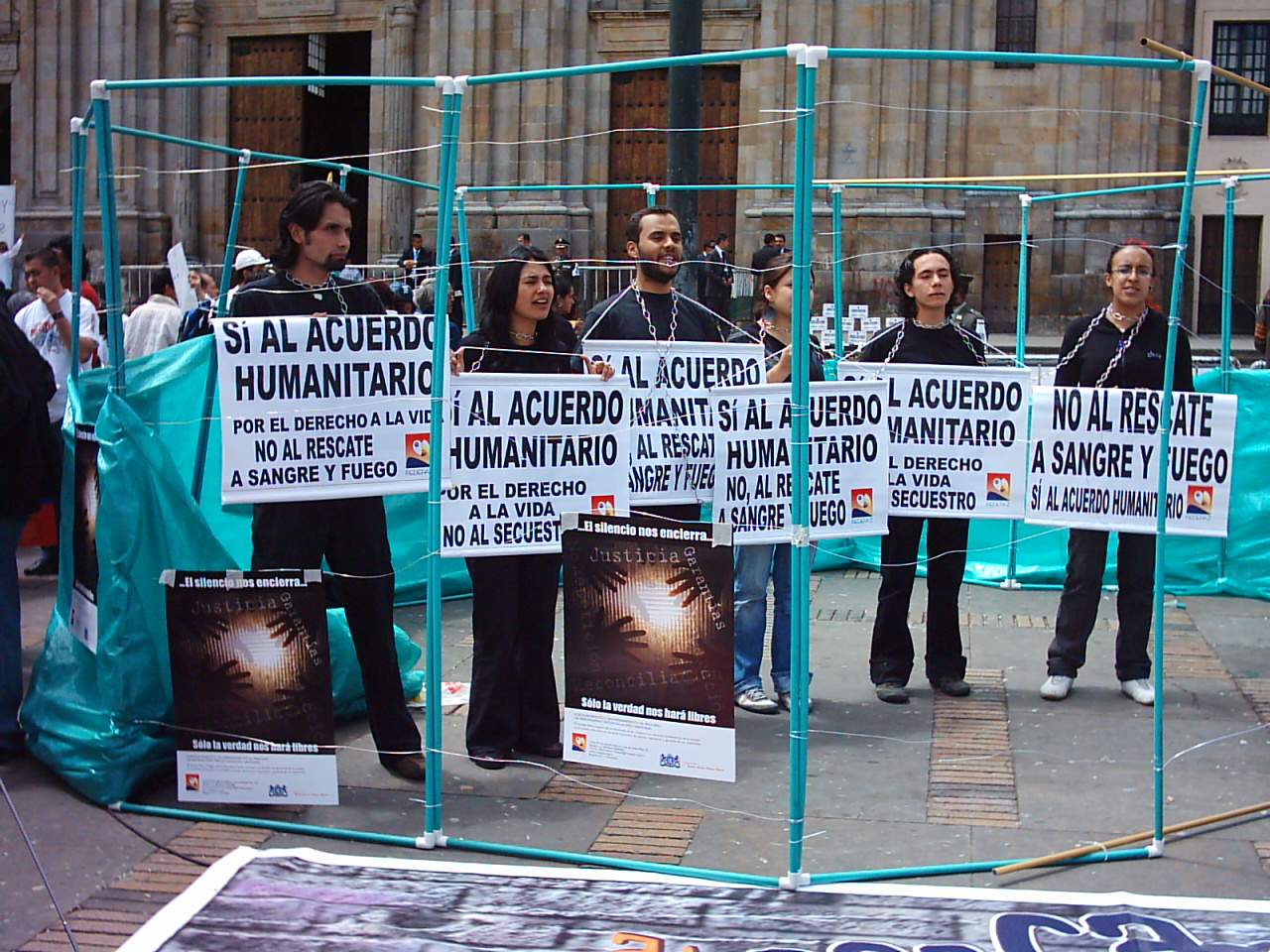
Colombian protesters against kidnappings and military rescue operations of FARC hostages

Kidnappings in Colombia refers to the practice of kidnapping in the Republic of Colombia. This criminal practice was first introduced in modern Colombian history during the early 1970s by the guerrilla movements and, later, also by criminal groups. With the release of Colombian presidential candidate Ingrid Betancourt on July 2, 2008 this practice gained worldwide notoriety.

Guerrilla groups like the M-19, the FARC, ELN among others widely exploited this practice. To counter these paramilitary groups also adopted this method to intimidate adversaries. Drug cartels like the Medellín Cartel also used this practice to intimidate politicians who were trying to approve in congress an extradition treaty with the United States, and also used in drug cartel wars. Regular criminal organizations also kidnap and sell persons of interest to guerrilla groups.

Police in Colombia say the number of people kidnapped has fallen 92% since 2000. Common criminals are now the perpetrators of the overwhelming majority of kidnappings.

According to a 2022 study by political scientist Danielle Gilbert, armed groups in Colombia engage in ransom kidnappings as a way to maintain the armed groups' local systems of taxation. The groups resort to ransom kidnappings to punish tax evasion and incentivize inhabitants not to shirk.

== Extent ==
By July 2005, the FARC alone had an estimated 2500 kidnapped civilians, without including the number of military servicemen or government officials. The paramilitary groups were estimated to have kidnapped 500 people between 1996 and 2004. Guerrilla organizations typically demand a ransom, while paramilitary groups generally used the practice as a means of terror or coercion.

Since the 1970s, kidnappings in Colombia gradually increased until 2001. In the year 2000 alone the number of kidnapped people in Colombia rose to 3572. This number declined steadily in the following years, reaching 687 kidnappings in 2006. By the year 2015, the number of kidnappings had declined to 213 and it continues to decline. Colombia no longer has the highest rate of kidnappings in the world. By the year 2016, the number of kidnappings in Colombia had declined to 205 and it continues to decline. Common criminals are now the perpetrators of the overwhelming majority of kidnappings.

== Other forms of kidnapping ==
Following the guerrilla's example, criminal organizations mostly based in large cities began to practice Express kidnappings (secuestros express), colloquially named "Millionaire tours" (Paseo Millionario). Victims are boarded in places with little police presence or where they are most vulnerable. Most commonly these are performed after victims withdraw money from ATMs or while riding in fake, terrorist-operated taxi cabs.

== Famous kidnapped victims ==
=== by drug cartels ===
- Diana Turbay (Killed during a botched rescue attempt)
- Andrés Pastrana (Rescued)
- Francisco Santos (Released)

=== by FARC ===
See List of political hostages held by FARC

- Ingrid Betancourt (Rescued)
- Fernando Araújo Perdomo (Escaped)
- Oscar Tulio Lizcano (Escaped)
- Guillermo Gaviria Correa (Killed during a botched rescue attempt)
- Jhon Frank Pinchao (Escaped)
- Consuelo González (Released)
- Farc's kidnapping of 12 Valle del Cauca Deputies (11 were killed during a fight between two rebel units. The only survivor was freed in February 2009)
- Alan Jara (Released)
- Keith Stansell (Rescued)
- Marc Gonsalves (Rescued)
- Thomas Howes (Rescued)
- Haruo Matsumura (Killed)
- Luis Francisco Cuellar (Killed in captivity)
- Thomas Hargrove (Released; ordeal fictionalized in the 2001 movie Proof of Life)

=== By ELN ===
- Ancizar López (Died in captivity)

=== By paramilitaries ===
- Piedad Cordoba (Released)

== See also ==
- Security issues in Colombia
- Colombian Armed Conflict
- Muerte a Secuestradores (Death to kidnappers)

General:

- Crime in Colombia
