= Tanja Nijmeijer =

Political activist

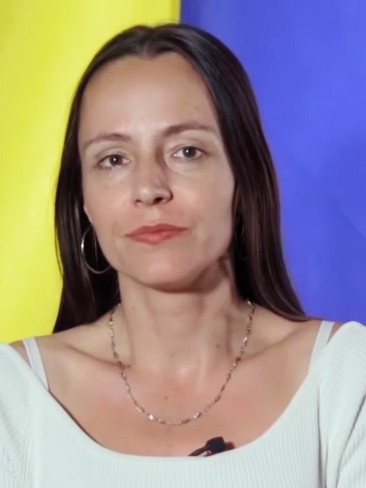
- Born: 13 February 1978 (age 48); Denekamp, Netherlands
- Other names: Eileen; Alexandra Nariño
- Occupations: English teacher, FARC member
- Years active: 2002–present

Tanja Nijmeijer (Dutch pronunciation: [ˈtɑɲaː ˈnɛimɛiər]; born 13 February 1978), also known as Alexandra Nariño, is a Dutch former guerrilla and English teacher who has been a member of the Colombian guerrilla group Revolutionary Armed Forces of Colombia (FARC) since 2002. She has also been one of the group's leading public figures since the discovery of her diary in 2007. She was part of the negotiating team involved in unsuccessful peace talks with the Colombian government.

== Early life and education ==
Tanja Nijmeijer was born on 13 February 1978 in Denekamp in the Netherlands.

Nijmeijer studied Romance languages and Romance cultures at the University of Groningen. In 1998 she went to Colombia and became an English teacher. She later returned to the Netherlands and continued her university studies.

== FARC ==
In 2002, Nijmeijer returned to Colombia and in November joined the Revolutionary Armed Forces of Colombia (FARC). She became one of FARC's leading public figures from 2007 onwards, when a private journal she had been keeping was found by the Colombian military and became the focus of international news reports. In her journal Nijmeijer wrote about the hardships of, and her occasional disillusionment with life as a guerrilla. Up until 2010, Nijmeijer was in a romantic relationship with a nephew of FARC leader Víctor Julio Suárez Rojas.

In Autumn 2012, she was named as a member of the FARC delegation in the negotiations with the Colombian government in Oslo.

She is charged with terrorism in the United States for allegedly participating in the kidnapping of three American citizens. The three Americans (Private Military Contractors), Marc Gonsalves, Keith Stansell and Thomas Howes, described their experiences after being freed in their book, Out of Captivity. They were conducting a reconnaissance flight in a single-engine aircraft under orders from the Pentagon. Their reconnaissance plane was equipped with Forward-looking infrared equipment. The goal was to locate FARC camps and cocaine laboratories in the Colombian jungle. The plane made an emergency landing in 2003 due to engine failure in an area where the FARC was stationed. American pilot Tommy Janis was shot dead on the run and a Colombian sergeant was executed on the spot by the FARC. The three American hostages (according to the FARC, prisoners of war to be exchanged for captured FARC fighters) were freed along with Íngrid Betancourt five years later during Operation Jaque. If found guilty she would face up to 60 years in prison.

Some time in 2017, German filmmaker Marcel Mettelsiefen contacted Nijmeijer in order to do a documentary on her and life in the FARC. She was initially reluctant to speak with him but eventually agreed after news of other ex-fighters getting killed. The documentary was released in 2023. Nijmeijer's reaction was mostly negative. In an article on her personal blog, she argued the documentary focused too much on the "lame diaries" and press reactions, at the expense of her ideas and the issues with the Colombian peace process, and took issue with its attempt to incorporate other views, writing that a neutral perspective on the conflict was impossible.

She has a blog where she talks about her experiences and position about the FARC.
