= Operation Jaque =

Military operation

- Part of Colombian armed conflict (1964–present)
Date	2 July 2008
Location	Rainforests of Guaviare, Colombia 2°17′47.12″N 72°2′56.86″W
Result	Colombian victory: 15 hostages successfully rescued without any shots fired.

Belligerents
Colombia	FARC

Commanders and leaders
Gen. Freddy Padilla de León	Gerardo Aguilar Ramírez, aka "César"

Units involved
Colombian Army	Unknown

Strength
4 air crew 8 commandos 2 helicopters	60 guerrillas

Casualties and losses
None	2 guerrilleros captured
- Location within Colombia

Operation Jaque (Spanish: Operación Jaque) was a Colombian military operation that resulted in the successful rescue of 15 hostages, including former Colombian presidential candidate Íngrid Betancourt. The hostages had been held by the Revolutionary Armed Forces of Colombia (FARC). The operation took place on 2 July 2008, along the Apaporis River in the department of Guaviare.

The other hostages freed were Marc Gonsalves, Thomas Howes, and Keith Stansell, three American military contractors employed by Northrop Grumman and 11 Colombian military and police. Two FARC members were arrested.

== Abduction ==
The hostages were abducted in February 2003.

== Operation details ==
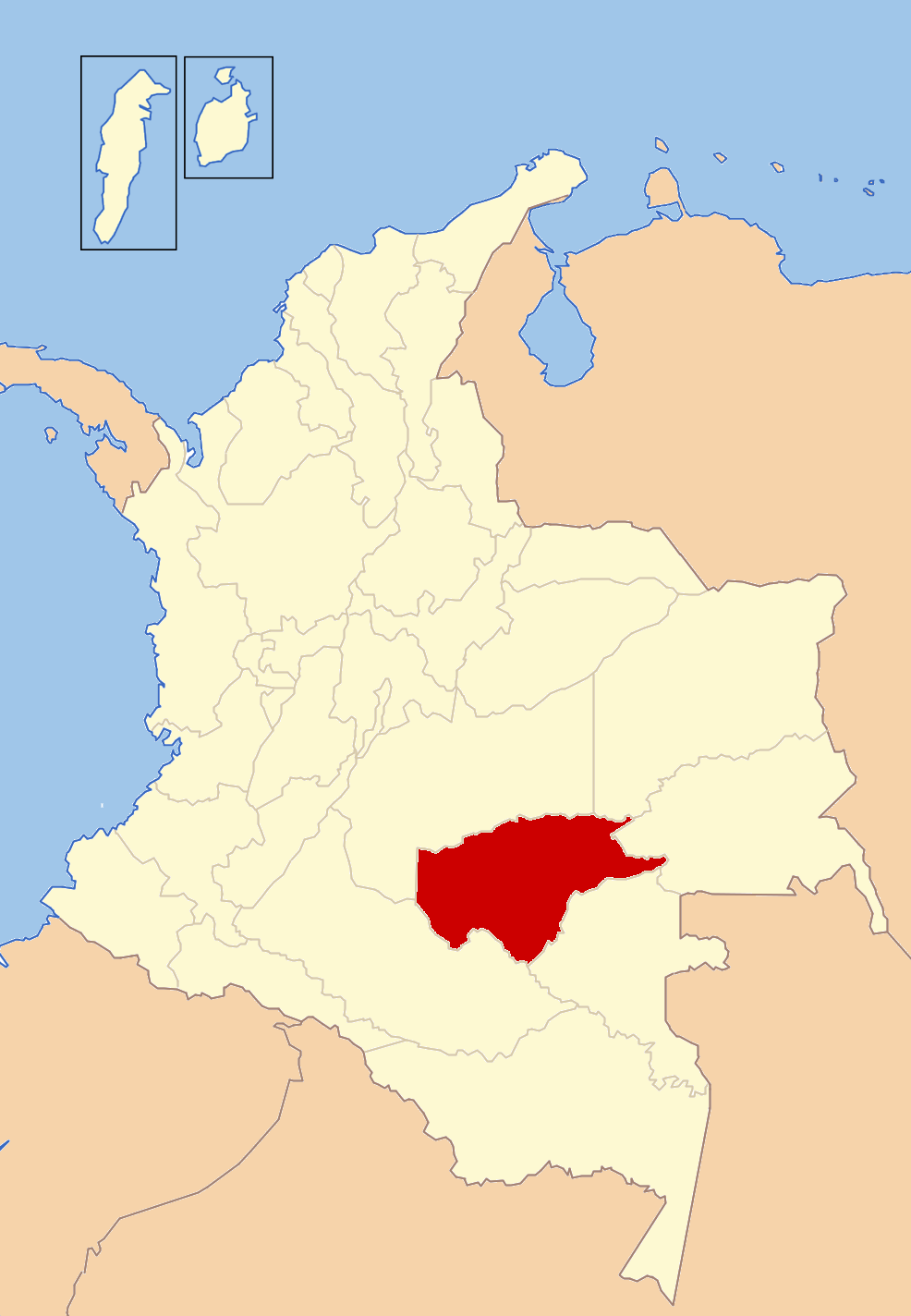
The Guaviare Department highlighted in red, was the area of operations.

The intelligence gathering for the operation began long before it was actually carried out; according to one American official, Colombia had managed to place a mole within the FARC itself one year, if not more, before the operation. According to a colonel involved in the operation, Colombia had located the hostages roughly four months before the rescue.

Between this time and the actual mission, Colombian forces spotted five of the hostages while they were bathing in the Apaporis River (including the three Americans), leading them to plant motion-sensors and video cameras along the waterway. At one point a FARC guerilla accidentally kicked a device while walking in the jungle to relieve himself; however, the surveillance operation's cover was not blown.

The idea of tricking the FARC into regrouping the hostages was seriously considered in late May. The following month, General Freddy Padilla de León brought the rescue plan to his civilian superiors. Defense Minister Juan Manuel Santos is said to have agreed quickly to the plan; President Álvaro Uribe, after weighing the possible diplomatic consequences, also approved it.

Santos said the FARC rebels had been tricked into handing over the hostages by soldiers posing as members of a fictitious non-government organisation that supposedly would fly the captives to a camp to meet rebel leader Alfonso Cano; to prepare for the role, they took acting classes for a week and a half. Two soldiers posed as fellow guerilla fighters and four troops dressed as aid workers. Several aspects of the mission were apparently designed to mimic previous Venezuelan hostage transfers, including the actual composition of the group and the type and markings of the helicopters used.

According to Betancourt, the hostages were moved early on the morning of July 2 across the river to a landing zone where they were told by their captors that they were going to be moved to a different location. Two Mi-17 helicopters came to the landing area in Guaviare, where one, carrying Colombian agents wearing Che Guevara T-shirts, landed to pick up the hostages. In total, the helicopter spent 22 minutes on the ground, during which time the hostages were handcuffed and loaded aboard; the pilot and copilot communicated with fellow security personnel in code.

The local FARC commander, known as "César" and an additional rebel boarded the helicopters along with the hostages. They were persuaded to hand over their pistols and were subdued in the air by Colombian forces. Betancourt later told a press conference she at first had had no idea she was being rescued until she saw her captor naked and blindfolded on the floor of the aircraft. She and the others were told: "Somos el Ejército Nacional. ¡Ustedes están en libertad!" (We are the national army. You are free.)

In case of failure, Colombia had prepared an armada of 39 helicopters to ferry 2000 troops plus U.S. advisors. They would have been brought within a half-mile of the original landing zone in under 15 minutes.

== Aftermath ==
Immediately after the hostage rescue El Espectador commissioned an Ipsos-Napoleon Franco poll, which found that President Uribe's popularity had jumped from 73% to 91%, while 79% (previously 69%) of those polled stated that they would vote for him.

Betancourt, describing operation Jaque, said "I am unaware of a precedent to such a perfect mission. Maybe only the Israelis...their wonderful commandos may be reminiscent of the mission that took place here."

Immediately after the hostage rescue, Colombian military forces cornered the rest of FARC's 1st Front, the unit which had held the hostages captive, offering them amnesty if they surrender.

Gerardo Aguilar Ramírez, known as "Cesar", was sent to the United States in July 2009 where U.S. federal courts put him on trial for trafficking in cocaine and other narcotics during his time in FARC. He was convicted on several trafficking charges and is now serving a 27-year sentence in federal prison.

== Controversies ==
=== Alleged foreign involvement ===
The United States reportedly provided a transport plane and a medical team for the liberated hostages. According to Der Spiegel, Colombian authorities had used American spy satellites to track the location of the hostages since the beginning of 2008.

Keith Trowbridge (SarDev International), an American kidnap and ransom consultant, allegedly provided Colombia with ground reconnaissance and the intelligence that led to the placement of the mole within FARC. It is believed that Trowbridge spearheaded the deadly yet successful rescue of a teenage hostage from the FARC six kilometers south of Medellín in 2006, affording him a unique relationship with the Colombia judiciary. Although Colombia acknowledged Trowbridge's help in the Medellín case, they strongly denied his intervention.

Israeli tracking technology was also, allegedly, used in the rescue. Some reports also highlighted the role of Global CST, a company owned by former Israeli Brigadier Generals Israel Ziv and Yossi Kuperwasser, which has a US$10 million contract with Colombia to provide security advising and equipment, although Ziv and Kuperwasser declared their role was only general training of armed forces and commented that "We don't want to take credit for something we didn't do", adding that they did not take part in the rescue, calling it "a Colombian Entebbe operation".

According to Colombia's W Radio, the Colombian military strongly denied that Global CST played any direct role in the operation.

Defence Minister Juan Manuel Santos emphasized at a press conference on 4 July, that there was no direct foreign involvement of any kind in the operation. However, he did say that a U.S. surveillance aircraft monitored the situation.

=== Allegations of payment ===
On 4 July 2008, Radio Suisse Romande reported that unnamed "reliable sources" had told it the rescue took place after a payment of US$20 million by the United States. According to Le Monde, the French Foreign Ministry denied the payment of any ransom by France.

Frederich Blassel, Radio Suisse Romande journalist, told Colombia's W Radio that, according to his source, the release was not negotiated directly with FARC but with Gerardo Aguilar, alias César, one of the two guerrillas captured during the operation, who would have received the payment of US$20 million. According to Blassel, the two rebels could be given new identities by Spain, France, and Switzerland.

Minister of Defense Juan Manuel Santos, and Vice President Francisco Santos, in response to these claims, denied any payment. "That information is absolutely false. It has no basis. We don't know where it comes from and why its being said". The minister of defense also added with a touch of irony that "Actually, it would have been a cheap offer, because we were willing to give up to USD 100 million..." "We would be the first to inform publicly, because it is part of our rewards system policy, and besides, it would speak much worse about the FARC".

According to Colombia's El Tiempo and W Radio, General Freddy Padilla de León, commander of the Colombian armed forces, denied the existence of any payment by the Colombian government. General Padilla argued that if any payment had been made, it would have been better to make it publicly known, to use it as an incentive and to cause confusion within FARC's ranks. William Brownfield, the U.S. ambassador to Colombia, also denied the allegations.

These allegations lost much of its credibility when, in February 2009, Gerardo Aguilar Rodriguez, known as "César", was extradited to US by the Colombian Supreme Court on charges of narcotrafficking and then sentenced to 27 years in jail. He was charged with exchanging coca for weapons and supplies and with smuggling 1,000 kg of coca into the US since 2002. His sentimental partner, Nancy Conde Rubio (alias Doris Adriana), had already been extradited under charges of conspiring to aid and giving material support to terrorist organizations, after being captured in an independent operation.

Former French diplomat Noël Saez and Colombian journalist Gonzalo Guillen have also claimed that the Colombian government negotiated the hostage release with César in advance.

=== Misuse of a Red Cross emblem ===
On 15 July 2008, it was reported that according to unpublished photos and video footage viewed by CNN, which the network declined to buy from its source and whose authenticity it could not verify, Colombian military intelligence misused an official International Red Cross emblem during the rescue operation.

According to CNN, the material in question showed one man wearing a bib with the official symbol for the Red Cross shortly before the rescue operation began. CNN also reported that one frame of a heavily edited official video released by Colombian authorities two days after the operation showed a person who seemed to be the same man, wearing what appeared to be part of a Red Cross bib.

According to international legal expert Mark Ellis, misuse of the Red Cross emblem would be a breach of the Geneva Conventions and might constitute a war crime, because it could possibly endanger the work of official humanitarian workers in the future.

During a national press conference, Colombian President Uribe had asked former hostage Ingrid Betancourt if she had seen any emblems on the helicopter participating in the rescue mission, which she denied.

According to CNN, the unpublished video footage showed a logo with the words "Mision Internacional Humanitaria" (International Humanitarian Mission), consisting of "a stylized red bird made up of wavy red lines above two curved branches of blue leaves", pasted on the sides of the helicopter. The same logo appeared on the web site for a NGO of the same name said to be based in Barcelona, Spain, although CNN was unable to contact or verify the existence of the organization.

An official Red Cross spokesman told CNN that "the International Committee of the Red Cross cannot confirm that its logo and/or the Red Cross emblem were used ... the ICRC maintains an ongoing confidential dialogue with the Colombian authorities on a variety of humanitarian issues, including news reports that the Red Cross emblem may have been used in this operation."

CNN's report mentioned that Colombian rebel groups FARC and ELN had themselves misused the Red Cross emblem in earlier incidents.

On 16 July, Uribe announced that an internal investigation had found that one of the officers who participated in the operation had individually decided to make unauthorized use of a Red Cross emblem, claiming that he was nervous and feared the presence of armed guerrillas. Uribe said that Juan Manuel Santos had apologized to the International Red Cross.

After the Colombian government's declarations, Red Cross spokesperson Yves Heller stated in Bogotá, Colombia that "parties to the conflict must respect the Red Cross emblem at all times and under all circumstances."

In Geneva, Switzerland, Red Cross spokesman Florian Westphal declared that "it was important for us that this clarification was made by the Colombian authorities at the highest level" and said that the international organization accepted the Colombian government's explanation.

=== Unauthorized use of real NGO information ===
On 16 July 2007, the Colombian newsweekly Revista Semana published an online article stating that the International Humanitarian Mission NGO didn't exist, arguing that it was created by the Colombian military for the purposes of carrying out the rescue operation, and that its website used information from a real Barcelona-based organization, Global Humanitaria.

Semana cited a spokesperson for the Justice Department of Catalunya, Spain, who said that International Humanitarian Mission was never part of Catalunya's central register of legal entities. According to Semana's investigation, the official registry number used by the creators of the fake organization's website had been copied from the site for Global Humanitaria. Cinta Pluma, director of Global Humanitaria, denied having any participation in Operation Jaque or in the establishment of the false NGO, adding that they would consult their legal advisors before taking any action regarding the issue.

On 17 July, in an online press release, Global Humanitaria expressed surprise at the unauthorized use of their organization's registry number and website data, stated it had never participated in any humanitarian procedures involving FARC and hoped to meet with Colombian President Álvaro Uribe to clear up the situation, requesting respect for the organization's work and neutrality.

== Books about Operation Jaque ==
In February 2009, Operacion Jaque by Colonel Luis Alberto Villamarin Pulido was published. In July 2010, the book was published in electronic format (Amazon Kindle).

Another book, Out of Captivity (2009), has a chapter on Operation Jaque from the perspective of three of the rescued prisoners, Keith Stansell, Marc Gonsalves, and Thomas Howes.

== International reactions ==
- Canada: David Emerson, Minister of Foreign Affairs, welcomed the action of the government of Colombia resulting in the rescue of 15 hostages, "This is undoubtedly a historic event in Colombia's search for a lasting peace. We share the deep satisfaction and relief of the people of Colombia at the safe return of these hostages to their families."
- Chile: Chilean President Michelle Bachelet stated that "This is a victory for democracy, peace and freedom."
- Ecuador: Ecuadorian defense minister Javier Ponce stated that the liberation of the 15 hostages was something the world was waiting for, but also lamented the way it happened, saying "It is a pity it happened not as part of a peace process, but as a violent rescue by the Colombian Armed Forces." He claimed it diminishes the chances of a political resolution.
- France: French President Nicolas Sarkozy spoke by telephone with Álvaro Uribe on the night before the operation. He later thanked Uribe and gave a live news conference with the children and sister of Íngrid Betancourt on the night of July 2. Immediately after, the family and French Foreign Minister Bernard Kouchner boarded a French jet for Colombia. Various French political figures also expressed their relief with the rescue. In Paris some drivers honked their horns on the night of the rescue, and a public celebration was scheduled for July 3.
- Mexico: Mexican President Felipe Calderón telephoned President of Colombia Álvaro Uribe to congratulate him on the successful operation, hailing the strategy implemented to reinforce legality and order, which strengthens democratic life and social coexistence in Colombia.
- United States: U.S. President George W. Bush praised and thanked Uribe, and Secretary of State Condoleezza Rice said she was delighted with the rescue of the three American hostages. Republican presidential candidate John McCain, on a trip to Colombia, praised the rescue effort and urged the release of all hostages. Democratic presidential candidate Barack Obama also expressed praise at the rescue.
- Venezuela: Venezuelan President Hugo Chávez stated that "We are overjoyed at the liberation of those people ... and even happier to learn they were freed without spilling a drop of blood."

== List of hostages rescued ==
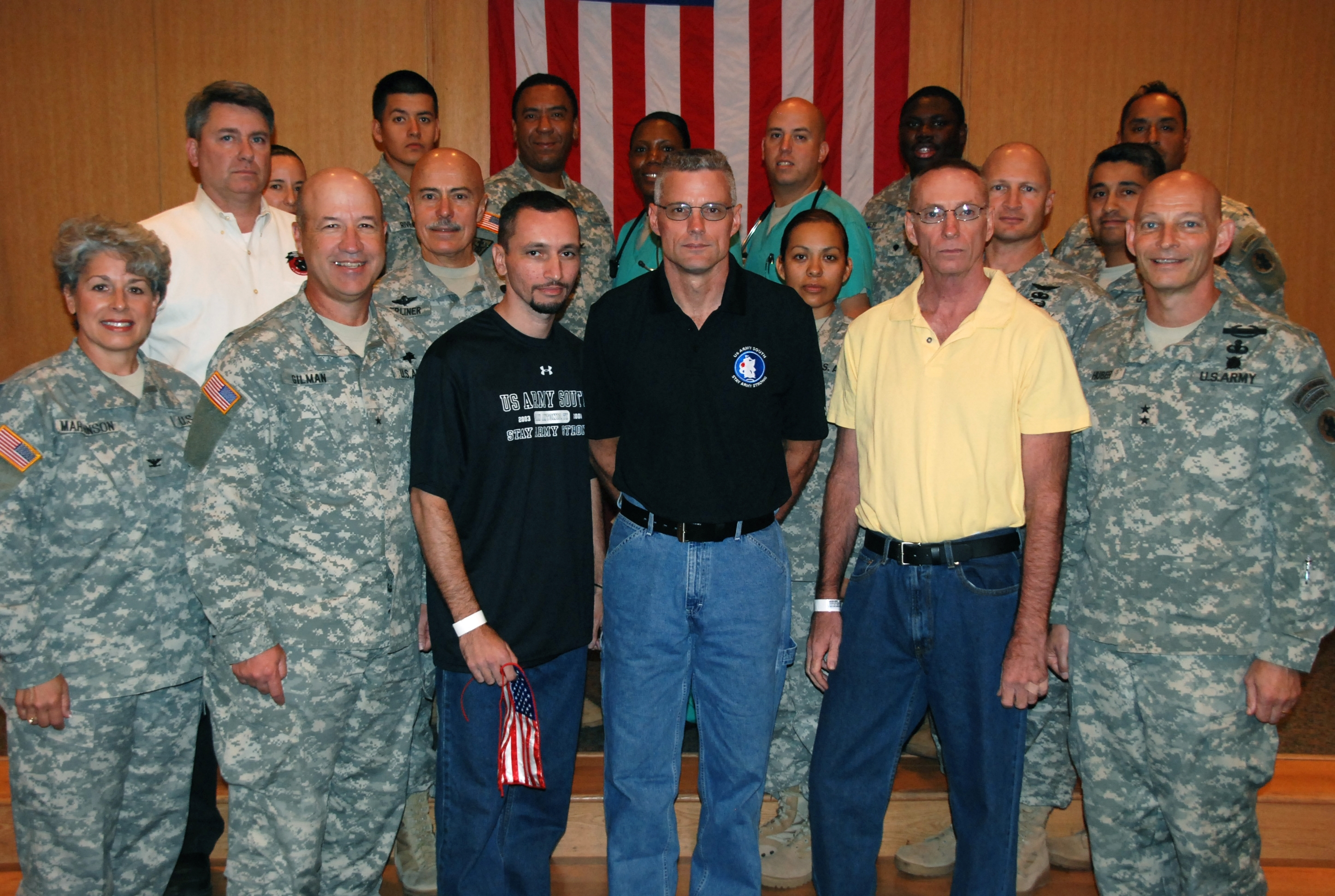
Gonsalves, Stansell and Howes (left to right, center) on July 4, 2008

- Íngrid Betancourt
- Marc Gonsalves
- Thomas Howes
- Keith Stansell
- Lieutenant Juan Carlos Bermeo (Colombian Army)
- Second Lieutenant Raimundo Malagón (Colombian Army)
- Sergeant José Ricardo Marulanda (Colombian Army)
- Sergeant Erasmo Romero (Colombian Army)
- Corporal William Pérez (Colombian Army)
- Corporal José Miguel Arteaga (Colombian Army)
- Corporal Armando Flórez (Colombian Army)
- Lieutenant Vianey Rodríguez (Colombian National Police)
- Corporal Jhon Jairo Durán (Colombian National Police)
- Corporal Julio Buitrago (Colombian National Police)
- Subintendent Armando Castellanos (Colombian National Police)

== See also ==
- Operation Emmanuel
- Chameleon Operation (Colombia)
- Opération 14 juillet
- Out of Captivity, a book authored by Marc Gonsalves, Keith Stansell, and Thomas Howes with the assistance of author Gary Brozek about their time spent as hostages of FARC guerrillas until their rescue.
