= Jhon Frank Pinchao =

Colombian policeman who escaped from the guerrillas

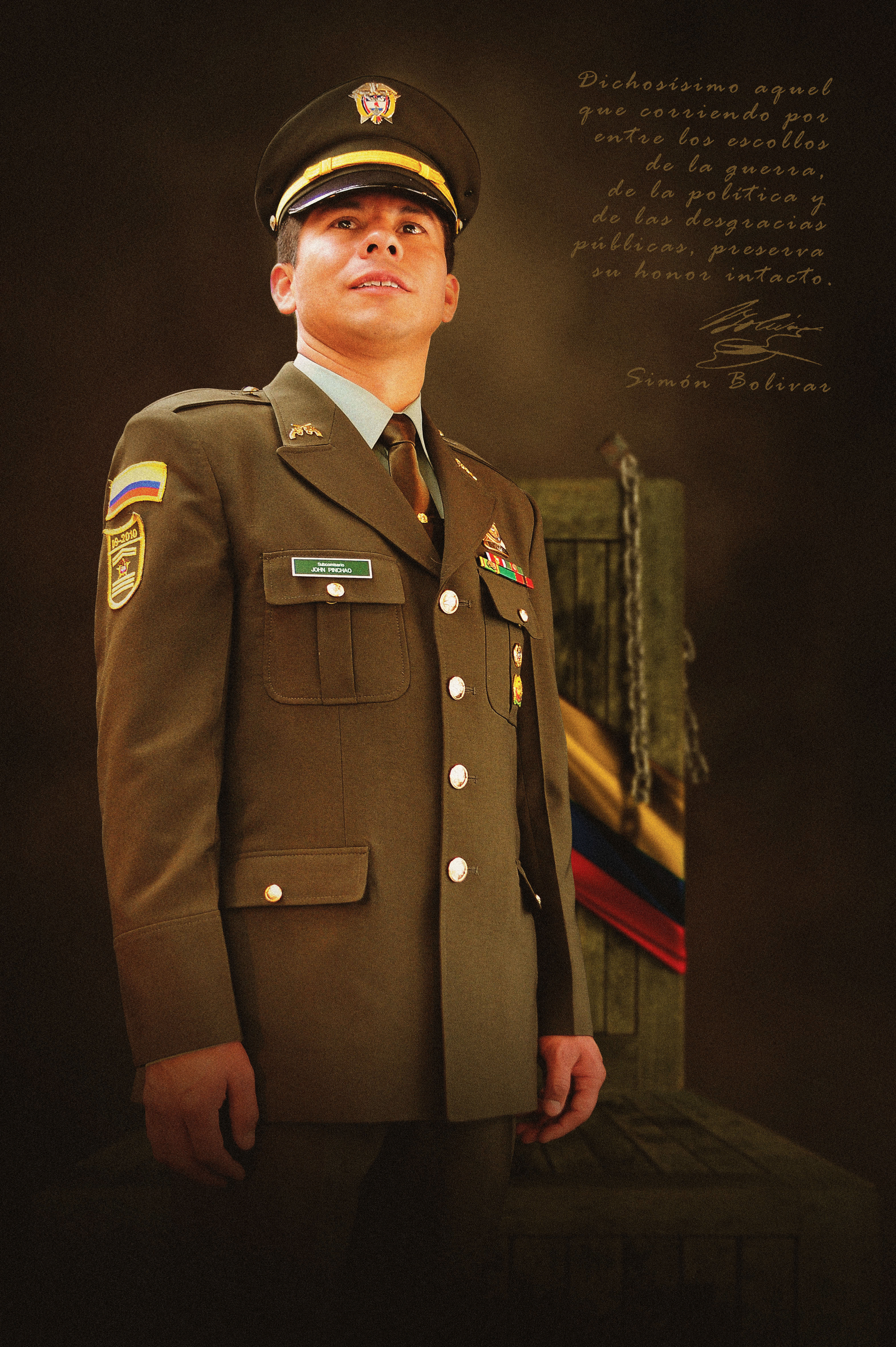
- Born: 1970 (age 55–56); Colombia
- Occupation: Policeman
- Known for: Kidnapping by FARC guerillas

Jhon Frank Pinchao Blanco (born 1970) is a Colombian policeman with the rank of Second Lieutenant who was kidnapped by the Revolutionary Armed Forces of Colombia (FARC) guerrilla group after FARC's attack on the town of Mitú, Vaupés Department on November 1, 1998. He escaped in 2007.

== Hostage ==
The attack on Mitú lasted 12 hours until the policemen ran out of ammunition, then FARC took over the town for 3 days. Pinchao was among the approximately 60 policemen taken as hostages. During the FARC-Government peace process (1999-2002) the Colombian government brokered a deal with the FARC and all of the low ranking policemen held as hostages were freed. The FARC did not release seven high-ranking officers, including Pinchao. In July 2003 the FARC allowed a journalist, Jorge Enríque Botero, to interview them. After that, Pinchao was not seen again until after his escape in 2007.

According to the Colombian Army, the guerrilla commander in charge of the hostages was Gerardo Aguilar Ramírez, aka "César," Commander of the Southern Bloc's 1st Front and member of the Central Command of the FARC.

== Freedom ==
In a televised interview with Caracol TV, Pinchao partially narrated his quest to freedom. He mentioned that while in his almost nine (9) years of captivity he had seen political figures Ingrid Betancourt and Clara Rojas also held as captives. He had also seen the three American contractors Keith Stansell, Thomas Howes and Marc Gonsalves also kidnapped by the FARC. Pinchao planned a way to escape for a year, and on April 28, 2007, he walked through virgin jungle for seventeen days until an indigenous group took him to a group of Police's Jungle Commandos, who were in the area destroying narcotics and narcoprocessing labs in the jungles of Vaupés by the Papuri River in the municipality of Pacoa. Pinchao was severely dehydrated and showed signs of malnourishment.

On May 15, 2007, Pinchao was transferred to a police base in San José del Guaviare and then to Bogotá. He was taken for check-ups at the National Police Central Hospital where he finally was reunited with his family.

== Family ==
Pinchao is son of Luis Evelio Pinchao and Rosa Blanco. Jhon Pinchao Blanco has a son, who was born while he was in captivity.

== See also ==
- List of kidnappings (1990–1999)
- List of solved missing person cases (1990s)

== See also ==
- Fernando Araújo also escaped after being kidnapped by FARC.
