= Gerardo Aguilar Ramírez =

Colombian guerrilla leader

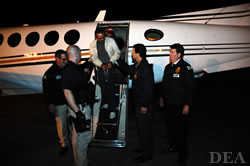
- Guerardo Aguilar Ramirez, member of the FARC extradited from Colombia to face kidnapping and illegal drug charges.
- Military career
- Allegiance: Revolutionary Armed Forces of Colombia (FARC); Communism
- Branch: Eastern Bloc's 1st Front
- Service years: ? – 2008 (captured)
- Rank: Chief of 1st Front and in charge of political hostages
- Nickname: César
- Conflicts: Colombian Armed Conflict

Gerardo Aguilar Ramírez, known by his nom de guerre César, was a Colombian guerrilla leader of the Revolutionary Armed Forces of Colombia (FARC). He was the commander of the Eastern Bloc's 1st Front. For five years he was in charge of FARC's hostages, including former presidential candidate Íngrid Betancourt.

On 2 July 2008, the hostages were rescued in Operation Jaque and César was arrested.

On 4 July 2008, Radio Suisse Romande reported that unnamed "reliable sources" had told it the rescue took place after a payment of US$20 million by the United States. According to Le Monde, the French Foreign Ministry denied the payment of any ransom by France.

Frederich Blassel, the author of the Radio Suisse Romande story, told Colombia's W Radio that, according to his source, the release was not negotiated directly with FARC but with César, one of the two guerrillas captured during the operation, who would have received the payment of US$20 million. According to Blassel, the two rebels could be given new identities by Spain, France, and Switzerland.

According to Colombia's El Tiempo and W Radio, General Freddy Padilla de León, Commander of the Colombian Armed Forces, denied any payment by the Colombian government. General Padilla argued that if any payment had been made, it would have been better to make it publicly known, to use it as an incentive and to cause confusion within FARC's ranks. William Brownfield, the U.S. ambassador to Colombia, also denied the allegations.

Aguilar was captured in July 2008 when members of the Colombian military, disguised as FARC rebels and a TV camera crew, freed former Colombian presidential candidate Ingrid Betancourt, three US hostages and twelve others. Aguilar and another guerrilla had taken off with the hostages in the designated helicopter with the hostages and disguised soldiers to supposedly transfer them to another FARC stronghold. During the helicopter flight the military personnel suddenly turned on Aguilar, subduing and disarming him and his accomplice before announcing their identities to the now-free hostages.

The Colombian Supreme Court extradited Aguilar to the U.S. in July 2009 on narcotics conspiracy charges. On 16 December 2009, Aguilar pleaded guilty in a Washington, D.C. federal court to conspiring to import large quantities of cocaine into the U.S. As the commander of FARC's 1st front from 1998 to July 2008, Aguilar said he directed his subordinates to manufacture and distribute thousands of tons of cocaine which was later smuggled into the U.S.

On 22 July 2010, Aguilar was sentenced to 27 years in prison. He is being held in a federal prison in Illinois.
