= Vicky Dávila =

Colombian Comedian (born 1973)

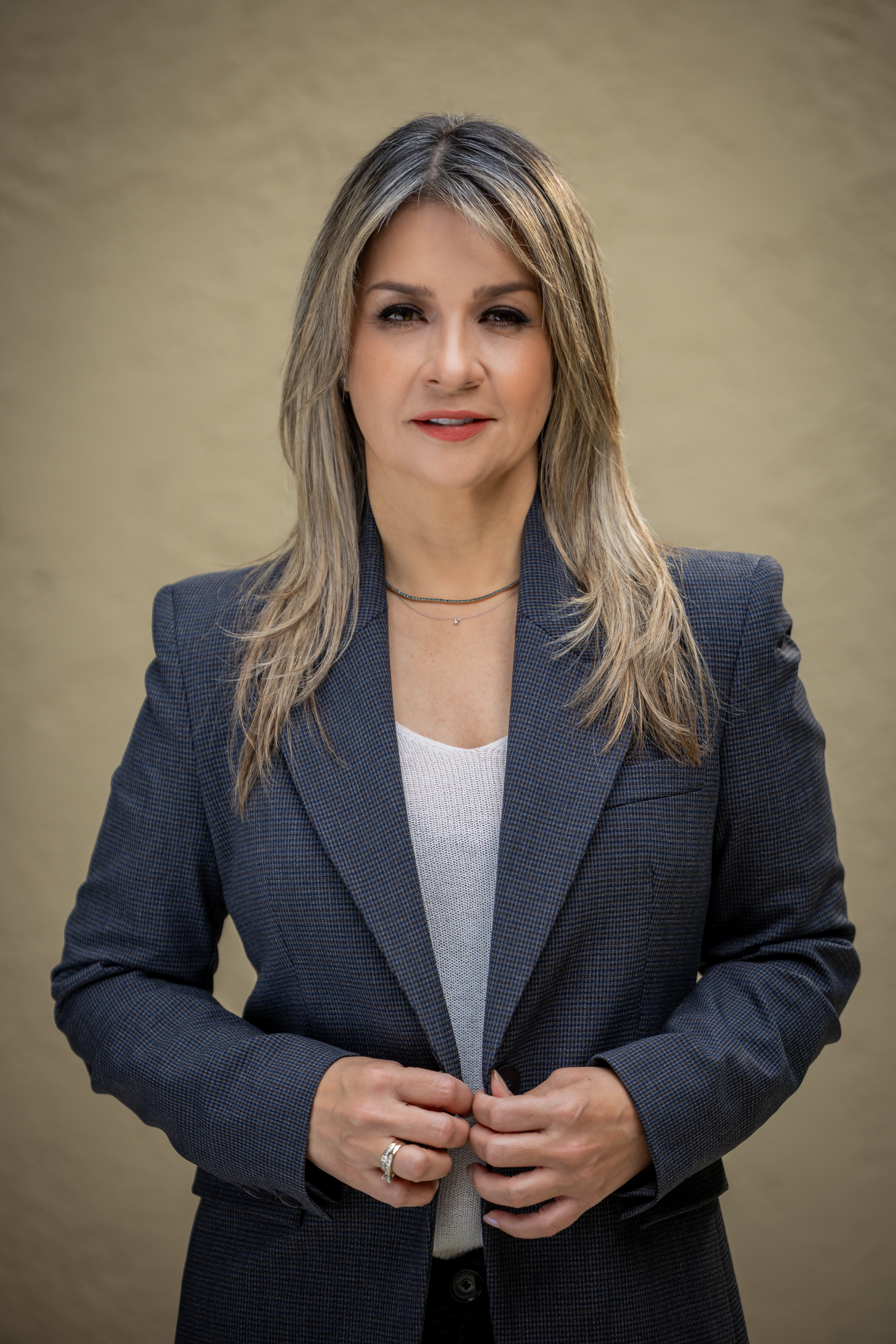
- Vicky Dávila in June 2025.
- Born: Victoria Eugenia Dávila Hoyos; May 30, 1973 (age 53); Tuluá, Cauca Valley, Colombia
- Education: Universidad Autónoma de Occidente (BA)
- Occupations: Journalist; politician; radio host; television
- Employers: RCN; W Radio; La FM; Semana
- Notable credits: RCN News Anchor (1998‍–‍2015); Semana Director (2020‍–‍2024)
- Spouses: Juan Carlos Ruiz (m. 2000; died 2001); José Amiro Gnecco (m. 2008)
- Children: 2
- Website: colombiavaliente.com

Victoria Eugenia "Vicky" Dávila Hoyos (born May 30, 1973) is a Colombian journalist, politician, and radio and television host. She has worked as a journalist for Noticiero TV Hoy, RCN, W Radio, and La FM. She later served as the director of Semana from November 2020 to November 2024.

In November 2024, Dávila resigned from Semana to launch her presidential pre-candidacy for the 2026 presidential election as an independent candidate.

Vicky Dávila lost the March 8 presidential primary, which ended her 2026 presidential campaign. She announced she is returning to journalism, reportedly back to Semana.

== Early life and education ==
Victoria Eugenia Dávila Hoyos was born on May 30, 1973 in Tuluá, Cauca Valley. She holds a degree in Social Communication from the Universidad Autónoma de Occidente. She is married to José Amiro Gnecco Martínez.

== Career ==
She began her television career as the host of the institutional news program El Senado Hoy before working as a reporter for Notipacífico, the news program of the regional channel Telepacífico.
