= List of political hostages held by FARC =

The Revolutionary Armed Forces of Colombia (FARC) was a self-proclaimed Marxist-Leninist revolutionary guerrilla organization, listed internationally as a terrorist group by a number of countries. Estimates claim that the FARC at one point had hundreds of hostages who were held for ransom.

The following list of former hostages are what the FARC called "canjeables" (exchangeable), as they offered their freedom in return for the liberty of 500 FARC members held in Colombian prisons through a prisoner exchange. The humanitarian exchange never happened. The FARC released their last political hostages in April 2012.

== Former hostages ==
Name	Capture			Release or demise	
Name	Date	Place	Position	Date	Reason
Pedro José Guarnizo Ovalle	1997-07-02	Urabá, Antioquia	Sergeant	2003-05-05	Rescued
Pablo Emilio Moncayo Cabrera	1997-12-21	Patascoy, Nariño	Corporal	2010-03-30	Released
Libio Jose Martinez Estrada	1997-12-21	Patascoy, Nariño	Corporal	2011-11-26	Killed
José Miguel Arteaga	1998-03-03	El Billar, Caquetá	Corporal	2008-07-02	Rescued
William Humberto Pérez Medina	1998-03-03	El Billar, Caquetá	Corporal	2008-07-02	Rescued
José Ricardo Marulanda Valencia	1998-03-03	El Billar, Caquetá	Sergeant First Class	2008-07-02	Rescued
Luis Alfonso Beltran Franco	1998-03-03	El Billar, Caquetá	Corporal	2012-04-02	Released
Luis Arturo Arcia	1998-03-03	El Billar, Caquetá	Corporal	2012-04-02	Released
Wagner Harvey Tapias Torres	1998-05-28	Mutata, Antioquia	Lieutenant	2003-05-05	Killed
Samuel Ernesto Cote	1998-06-11	Frontino, Antioquia	Corporal	2003-05-05	Killed
Francisco Manuel Negrete Mendoza	1998-08-01	Pavarandó, Antioquia	Corporal	2003-05-05	Killed
Mario Alberto Marín Franco	1998-08-03	Pavarandó, Antioquia	Corporal	2003-05-05	Killed
Armando Flórez Pantoja	1998-08-03	Miraflores, Guaviare	Corporal	2008-07-02	Rescued
Julio Cesar Buitrago Cuesta	1998-08-03	Miraflores, Guaviare	Corporal	2008-07-02	Rescued
Jhon Jairo Durán Tuay	1998-08-03	Miraflores, Guaviare	Corporal	2008-07-02	Rescued
Juan Carlos Bermeo Covaleda	1998-08-03	Miraflores, Guaviare	Lieutenant	2008-07-02	Rescued
Erasmo Romero Rodríguez	1998-08-03	Miraflores, Guaviare	Sergeant	2008-07-02	Rescued
Arbey Delgado Argote	1998-08-03	Miraflores, Guaviare	Sergeant	2010-06-13	Rescued
William Donato Gomez	1998-08-03	Miraflores, Guaviare	Lieutenant	2010-06-14	Rescued
Róbinson Salcedo Guarín	1998-08-03	Miraflores, Guaviare	Corporal	2012-04-02	Released
Luis Alfredo Moreno Chagueza	1998-08-03	Miraflores, Guaviare	Corporal	2012-04-02	Released
Raimundo Castellanos Malagón	1998-08-04	La Uribe, Meta	Sub-Lieutenant	2008-07-02	Rescued
Héctor Lucuara Duván Segura	1998-08-14	Tamborales, Chocó	Sergeant First Class	2003-05-05	Killed
Jairsinio Navarrete Sánchez	1998-08-15	Tamborales, Chocó	Corporal	2003-05-05	Killed
Edgar Yesid Duarte Valero	1998-10-14	El Paujil, Caquetá	Captain	2011-11-26	Killed
Elkin Hernández Rivas	1998-10-14	El Paujil, Caquetá	Lieutenant	2011-11-26	Killed
Luis Hernando Peña Bonilla	1998-11-01	Mitú, Vaupés	Sub-intendant	2003	Killed
Jhon Frank Pinchao Blanco	1998-11-01	Mitú, Vaupés	Sub-intendant	2007-05-16	Escaped
Julián Ernesto Guevara Castro	1998-11-01	Mitú, Vaupés	Captain	2006-01-28	Died in captivity
Vianey Javier Rodríguez Porras	1998-11-01	Mitú, Vaupés	Sub-Lieutenant	2008-07-02	Rescued
Luis Herlindo Mendieta Ovalle	1998-11-01	Mitú, Vaupés	Lieutenant Colonel	2010-06-13	Rescued
Enrique Murillo Sanchez	1998-11-01	Mitú, Vaupés	Captain	2010-06-13	Rescued
César Augusto Lasso Monsalve	1998-11-01	Mitú, Vaupés	Sergeant	2012-04-02	Released
Heriberto Aranguren González	1999-06-22	Aguas Prietas, Córdoba	Sergeant	2003-05-05	Rescued
Carlos José Duarte Rojas	1999-07-10	Puerto Rico, Meta	Sub-intendant	2012-04-02	Released
Wilson Rojas Medina	1999-07-10	Puerto Rico, Meta	Sub-intendant	2012-04-02	Released
Jorge Trujillo Solarte	1999-07-10	Puerto Rico, Meta	Sub-intendant	2012-04-02	Released
Jorge Humberto Romero	1999-07-10	Puerto Rico, Meta	Sub-intendant	2012-04-02	Released
José Libardo Forero Carrero	1999-07-10	Puerto Rico, Meta	Corporal	2012-04-02	Released
Armando Castellanos Gaona	1999-11-16	La Arada, Tolima	Sub-intendant	2008-07-02	Rescued
Luis Alberto Erazo Maya	1999-12-09	Curillo, Caquetá	Sergeant	2011-11-26	Rescued
Álvaro Jose Moreno	1999-12-09	Curillo, Caquetá	Intendant	2011-11-26	Killed
Alejandro Ledesma Ortiz	1999-12-12	Juradó, Chocó	Lieutenant	2003-05-05	Killed
José Gregorio Peña Guarín	1999-12-12	Juradó, Chocó	Corporal	2003-05-05	Killed
Antenor Biella Hernández	1999-12-12	Juradó, Chocó	Corporal	2003-05-05	Rescued
Oscar Tulio Lizcano	2000-08-05	Riosucio, Caldas	Representative	2008-10-26	Escaped
Fernando Araújo Perdomo	2000-12-04	Cartagena, Bolívar	Minister	2007-01-05	Escaped
Luis Eladio Pérez Bonilla	2001-06-10	Ipiales, Nariño	Senator	2008-02-27	Released
Gloria Polanco de Lozada	2001-06-26	Neiva, Huila	First Lady of the Huila Department	2008-02-27	Released
Alan Edmundo Jara Urzola	2001-07-15	Lejanías, Meta	Ex-Governor of Meta	2009-02-03	Released
Orlando Beltrán Cuellar	2001-08-28	Gigante, Huila	Representative	2008-02-27	Released
Consuelo González de Perdomo	2001-09-10	Highway in Huila	Representative	2008-01-10	Released
Jorge Eduardo Géchem Turbay	2002-02-20	Flight towards Hobo, Huila	Senator	2008-02-27	Released
Ingrid Betancourt Pulecio	2002-02-23	Montañitas, Caquetá	Presidential Candidate	2008-07-02	Rescued
Clara Leticia Rojas González	2002-02-23	Montañitas, Caquetá	Campaign Manager	2008-01-10	Released
Francisco Javier Giraldo Cadavid	2002-04-11	Cali, Valle del Cauca	Valle del Cauca Deputy	2007-06-18	Killed
Juan Carlos Narváez Reyes	2002-04-11	Cali, Valle del Cauca	Valle del Cauca Deputy	2007-06-18	Killed
Carlos Alberto Barragán López	2002-04-11	Cali, Valle del Cauca	Valle del Cauca Deputy	2007-06-18	Killed
Carlos Alberto Charry Quiroga	2002-04-11	Cali, Valle del Cauca	Valle del Cauca Deputy	2007-06-18	Killed
Jairo Javier Hoyos Salcedo	2002-04-11	Cali, Valle del Cauca	Valle del Cauca Deputy	2007-06-18	Killed
Edinson Pérez Núñez	2002-04-11	Cali, Valle del Cauca	Valle del Cauca Deputy	2007-06-18	Killed
Nacianceno Orozco Grisales	2002-04-11	Cali, Valle del Cauca	Valle del Cauca Deputy	2007-06-18	Killed
Rufino Varela	2002-04-11	Cali, Valle del Cauca	Valle del Cauca Deputy	2007-06-18	Killed
Alberto Quintero Herrera	2002-04-11	Cali, Valle del Cauca	Valle del Cauca Deputy	2007-06-18	Killed
Héctor Fabio Arizmendi Ospina	2002-04-11	Cali, Valle del Cauca	Valle del Cauca Deputy	2007-06-18	Killed
Ramiro Echeverri Sánchez	2002-04-11	Cali, Valle del Cauca	Valle del Cauca Deputy	2007-06-18	Killed
Sigifredo López Tobón	2002-04-11	Cali, Valle del Cauca	Valle del Cauca Deputy	2009-02-05	Released
Guillermo Gaviria Correa	2002-04-21	Caicedo, Antioquia	Governor of Antioquia	2003-05-05	Killed
Gilberto Echeverri Mejía	2002-04-21	Caicedo, Antioquia	Ex-Minister	2003-05-05	Killed
Keith Donald Stansell	2003-02-13	Caquetá Department	US American Contractor	2008-07-02	Rescued
Marc David Gonsalves	2003-02-13	Caquetá Department	US American Contractor	2008-07-02	Rescued
Thomas Randolph Howes	2003-02-13	Caquetá Department	US American Contractor	2008-07-02	Rescued
Emmanuel Rojas	Born 2004-04-16		Born in captivity	June 2005 (sent to Bogotá); December 2007 (found)	Found in foster care in Bogotá
William Giovanni Domínguez Castro	2007-01-20	Florencia, Caquetá	Private	2009-02-01	Released
Guillermo Javier Solórzano Julio	2007-06-04	Florida, Valle del Cauca	Captain	2011-02-16	Released
Alexis Torres Zapata	2007-06-09	El Paujil, Caquetá	Police Officer	2009-02-01	Released
José Walter Lozano Guarnizo	2007-06-09	El Paujil, Caquetá	Police Officer	2009-02-01	Released
Juan Fernando Galicio Uribe	2007-06-09	El Paujil, Caquetá	Police Officer	2009-02-01	Released
Salin Antonio San Miguel Valderrama	2008-05-23	El Tambo, Tolima	Corporal	2011-02-16	Released
Francisco Aldemar Franco Zamora	2009-03-22	Miraflores, Guaviare	Sergeant	May 2009	Killed
Josue Daniel Calvo Sanchez	2009-04-20	El Encanto, Meta	Private	2010-03-28	Released
Luis Francisco Cuellar Carvajal	2009-12-21	Florencia, Caquetá	Governor of Caqueta Department	2009-12-22	Killed
Henry Lopez Martinez	2010-05-23	Solano, Caquetá	Private	2011-02-11	Released
