= Denekamp =

- Town
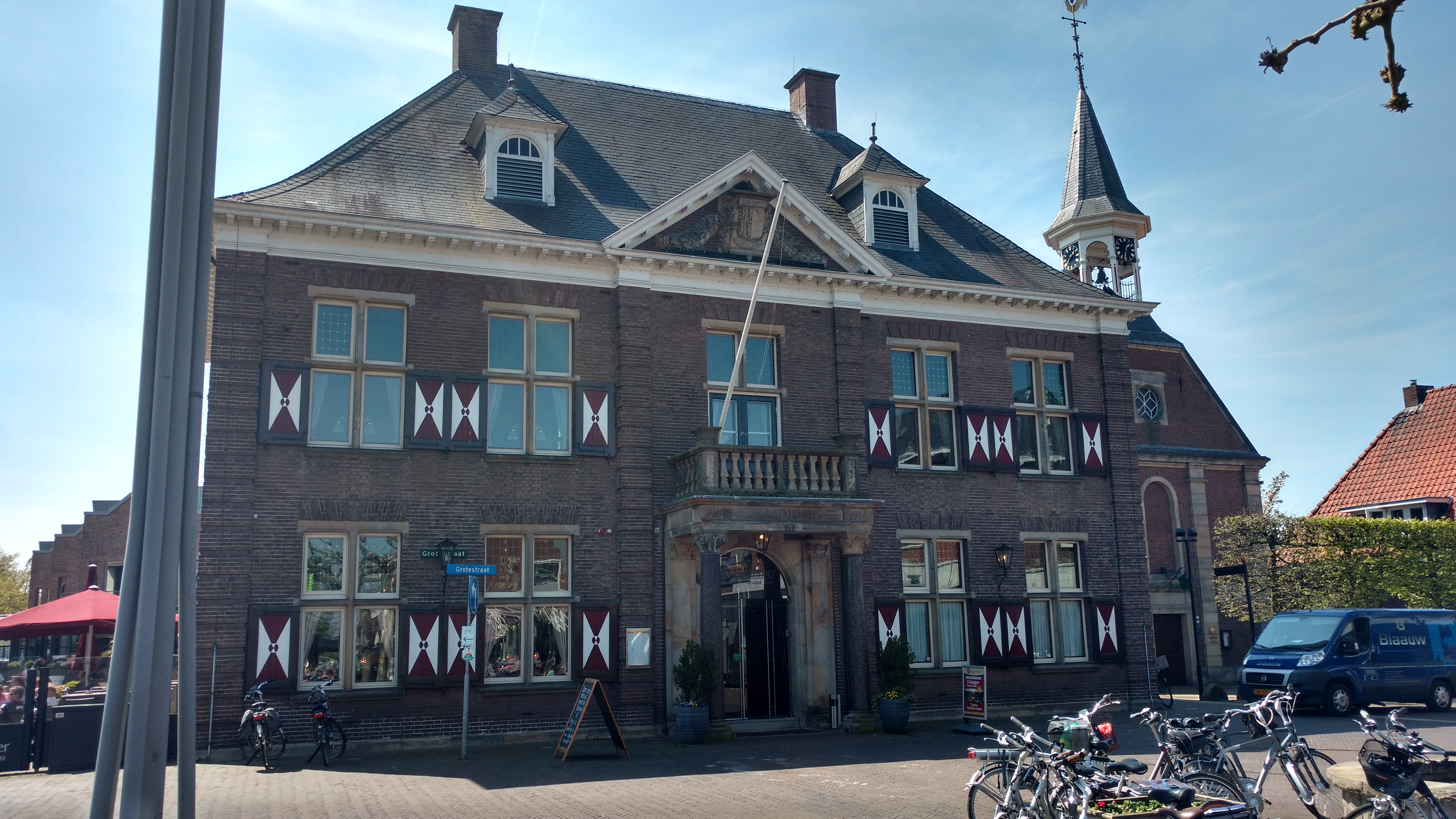
- Former town hall

- Flag Coat of arms
- Nickname: Köttelpeern
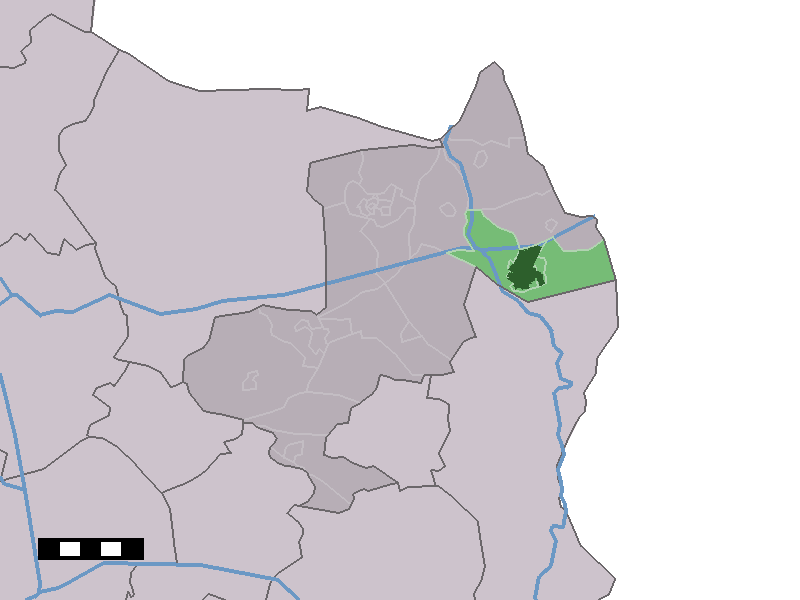
- The town centre (dark green) and the statistical district (light green) of Denekamp in the municipality of Dinkelland.

- Location in the Netherlands Denekamp (Netherlands)
- Coordinates: 52°22′46″N 7°0′32″E
- Country: Netherlands
- Province: Overijssel
- Municipality: Dinkelland

Area
  - Total: 18.29 km^{2} (7.06 sq mi)
- Elevation: 26 m (85 ft)

Population (2021)
  - Total: 9,125
  - Density: 498.9/km^{2} (1,292/sq mi)
- Demonym: Denekampers
- Time zone: UTC+1 (CET)
  - Summer (DST): UTC+2 (CEST)
- Postal code: 7591
- Dialing code: 0541

Denekamp (Dutch pronunciation: [ˈdeːnəkɑmp]) is a town in the Dutch province of Overijssel. It is a part of the region of Twente and the municipality of Dinkelland, and lies about 9 km northeast of Oldenzaal.

The town was first noted as early as the 10th century when it was referred to as Daginghem, and means "settlement of the people of Dago or Dano". The village started around the church which was built in 1275. It remained isolated and small until 1829 when the road from Deventer to Hamburg was built.

The location became a municipality in 1818 incorporating the settlements of Noord Deurningen, Lattrop, Breklenkamp, Tilligte, Nutter and Agelo. The municipality merged with Ootmarsum and Weerselo in 2001; the new municipality was first called "Denekamp", but was renamed in 2002 to Dinkelland.

The Town is known in the hardstyle scene, to be home of various Hardstyle DJ's.

== Notable people from Denekamp ==
- Roméo Dallaire (1946-), Canadian senator and retired general famous for being Force Commander of UNAMIR, the United Nations Assistance Mission for Rwanda during the 1994 Rwandan Genocide
- Hennie Kuiper (1949-), world champion cyclist.
- Tanja Nijmeijer, FARC member.
- Radical Redemption, Hardstyle producer and DJ.
- Angerfist, Hardstyle producer and DJ.

== Gallery ==
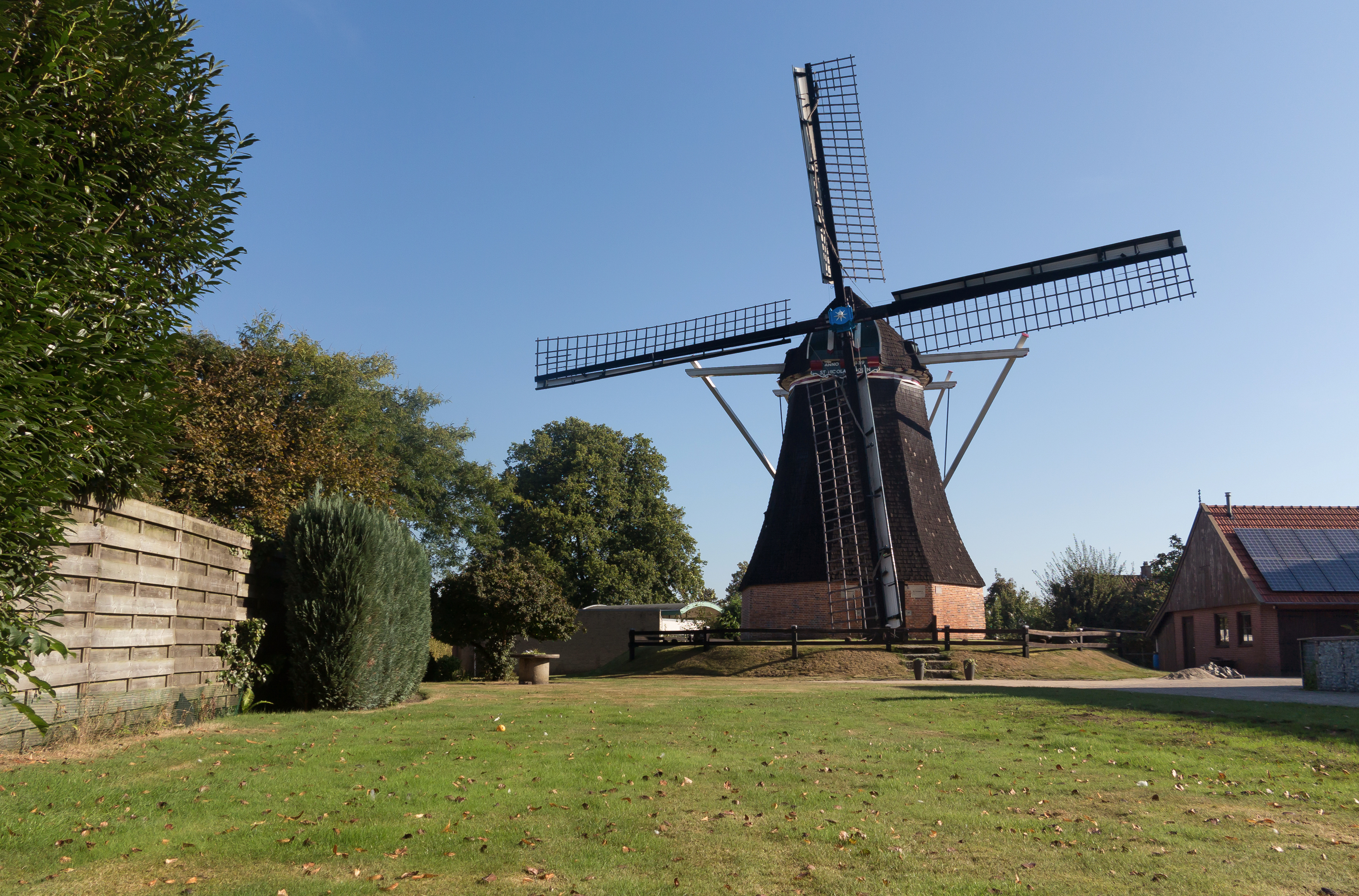
Windmill: de Sint Nicolaasmolen

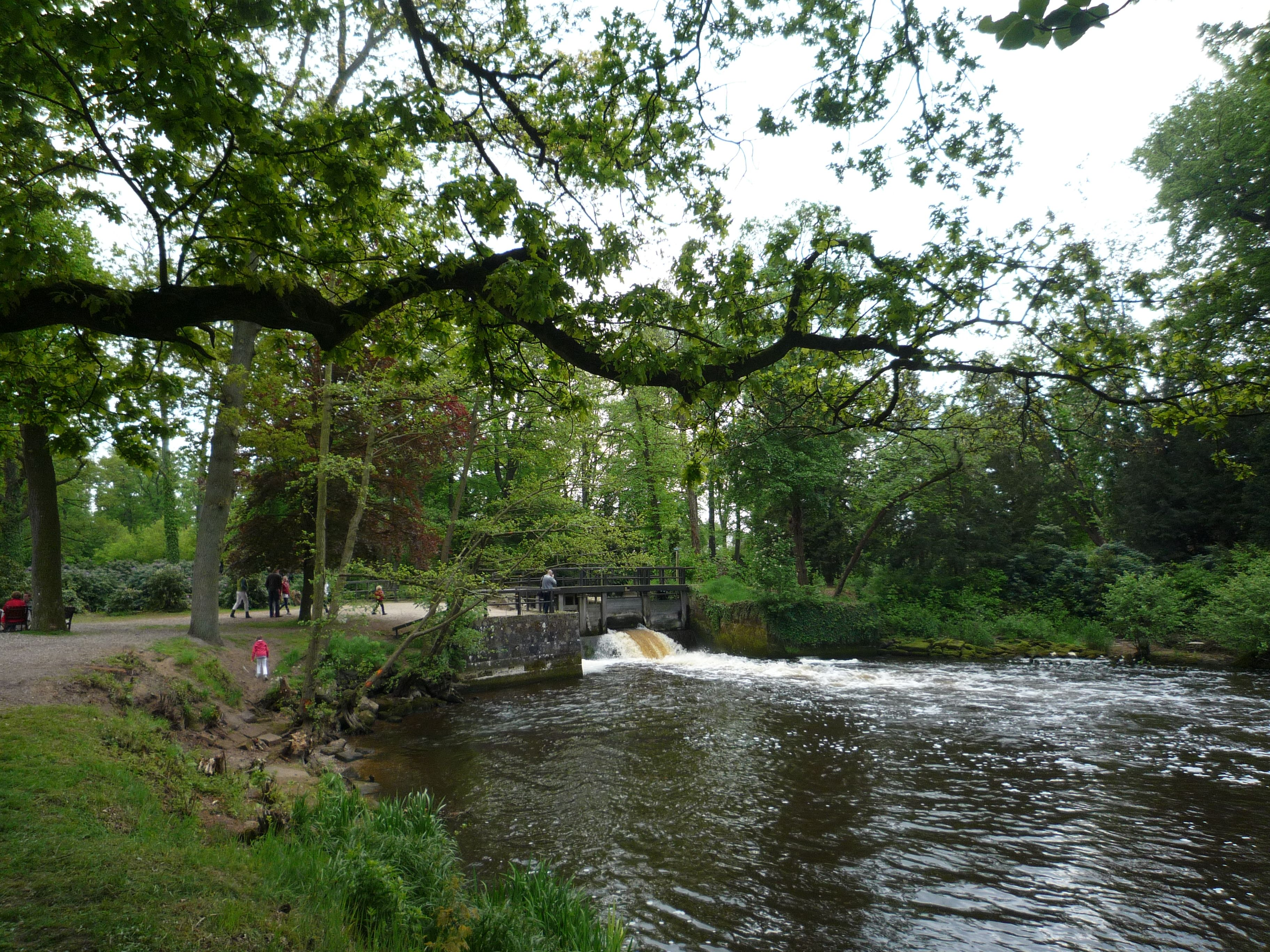
Brook

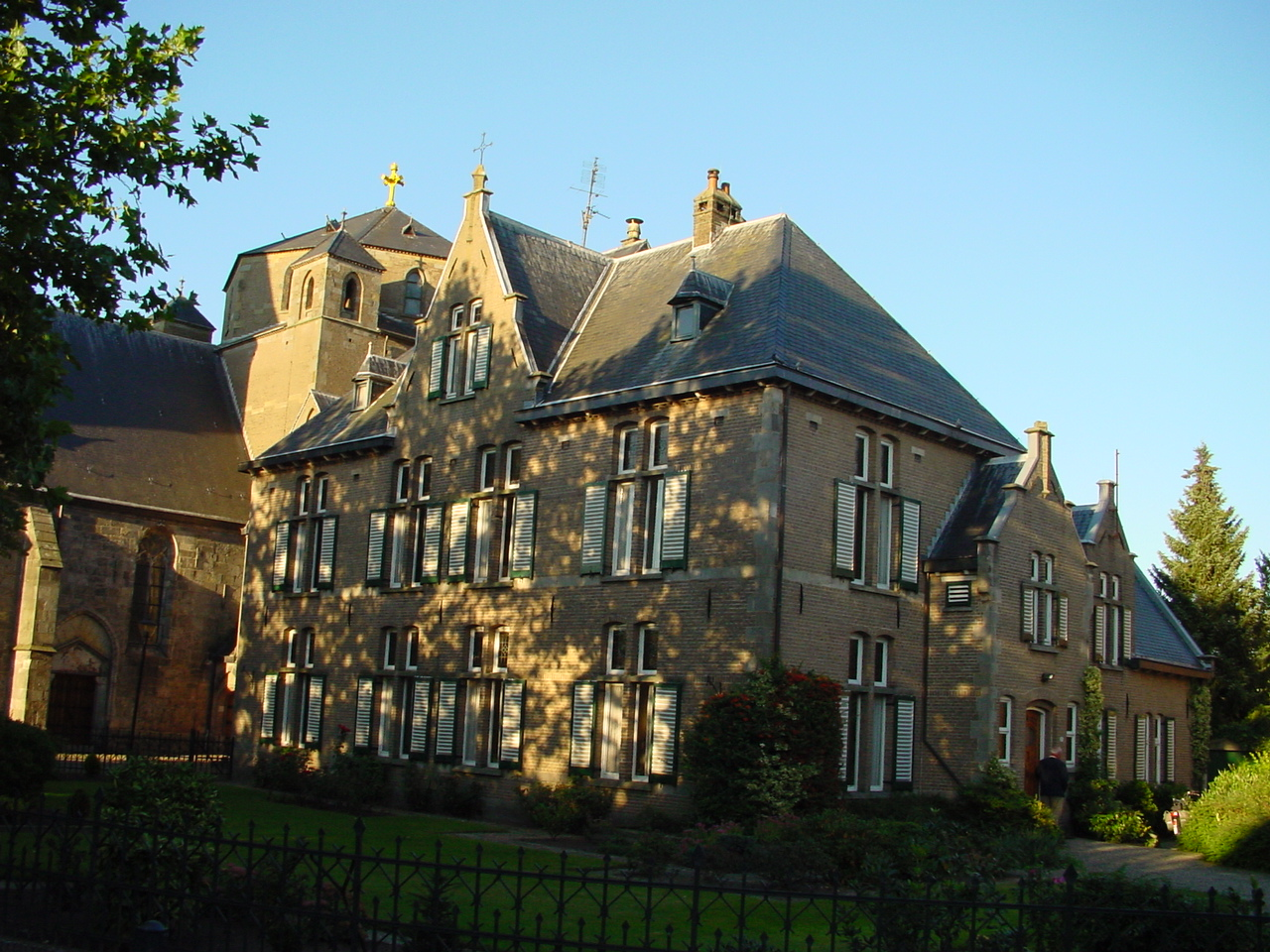
Clergy house

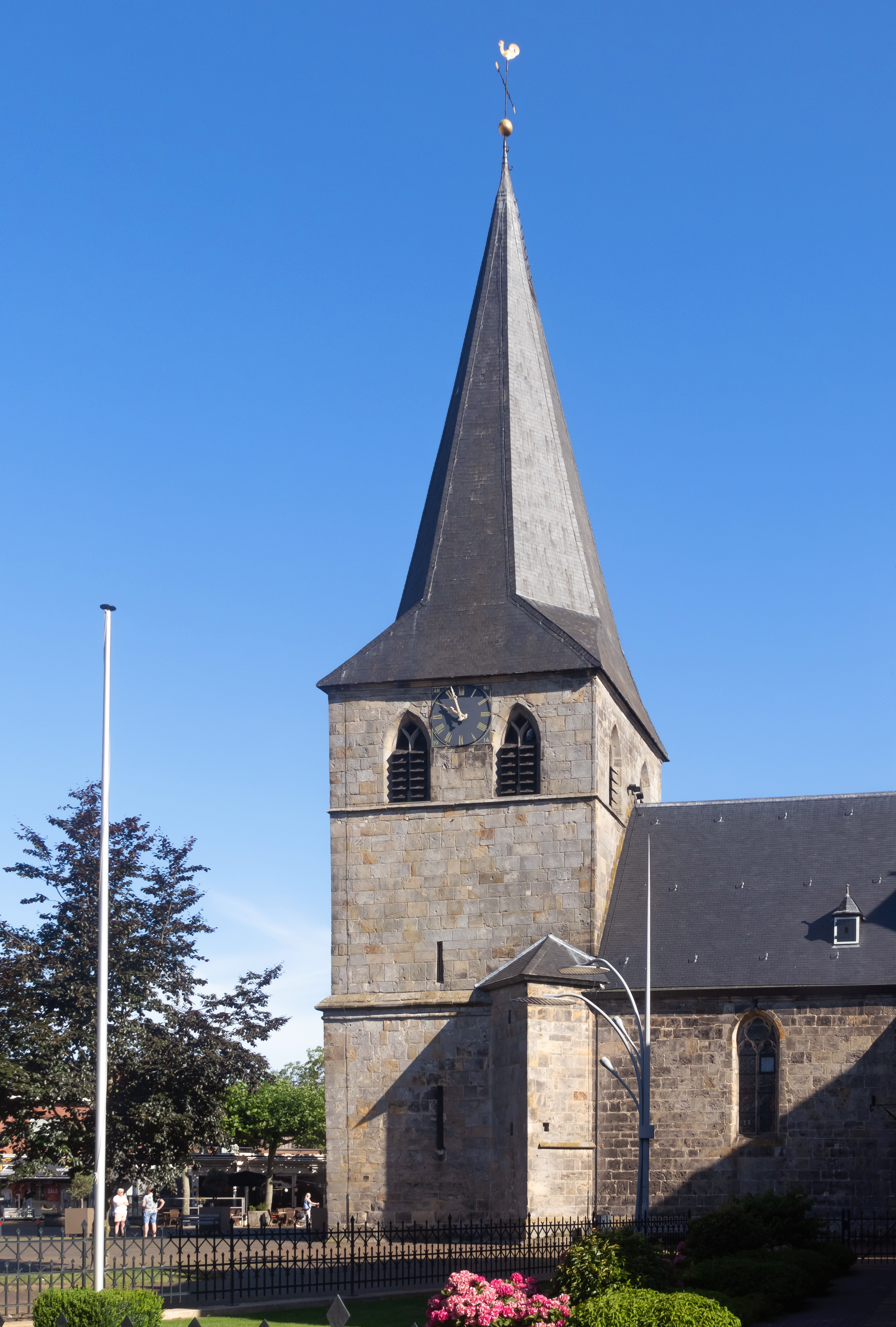
St. Nicholas Church in Denekamp
