= Crime in Colombia =

- Homicide: 24.4 (2024)
- Assault: 223.9 (2023)
- Burglary: 60.3 (2024)
- Theft: 804.0 (2024)
- Fraud: 301.8 (2024)
- Corruption: 24.0 (2024)
- Bribery: 1.2 (2024)
- Money laundering: 1.4 (2024)
- Rape: 38.5 (2023)
- Sexual violence: 46.3 (2023)
- reported per 100,000 inhabitants

Homicide rate in Colombia (1995-2015)

Colombia has a high crime rate due to being a center for the cultivation and trafficking of cocaine. The Colombian conflict began in the mid-1960s and is a low-intensity conflict between Colombian governments, paramilitary groups, crime syndicates, and left-wing guerrillas such as the Revolutionary Armed Forces of Colombia (FARC), and the National Liberation Army (ELN), fighting each other to increase their influence in Colombian territory. Two of the most important international factors that have contributed to the Colombian conflict are multinational companies and the United States.

Elements of all the armed groups have been involved in drug trafficking. In a country where state capacity has been weak in some regions, the result has been a grinding war on multiple fronts, with the civilian population caught in between and often deliberately targeted for "collaborating". Human rights advocates blame paramilitaries for massacres, "disappearances", and cases of torture and forced displacement. Rebel groups are behind assassinations, kidnapping and extortion.

In 2011, President Juan Manuel Santos launched the "Borders for Prosperity" plan to fight poverty and combat violence from illegal armed groups along Colombia's borders through social and economic development. The plan received praise from the International Crisis Group. Colombia registered a homicide rate of 24.4 per 100,000 in 2016, the lowest since 1974. The 40-year low in murders came the same year the government signed a peace agreement with the FARC. The murder rate further decreased to 22.6 in 2020, though still among the highest in the world, it decreased 73% from 84 in 1991. In the 1980s and 1990s it regularly ranked as number one.

Since the beginning of the crisis in Venezuela and the mass emigration of Venezuelans during the Venezuelan refugee crisis, desperate Venezuelans have been recruited into gangs in order to survive by other Venezuelan gang members. Venezuelan women have also resorted to prostitution in order to make a living in Colombia.

== Crime by type ==
=== Murder ===
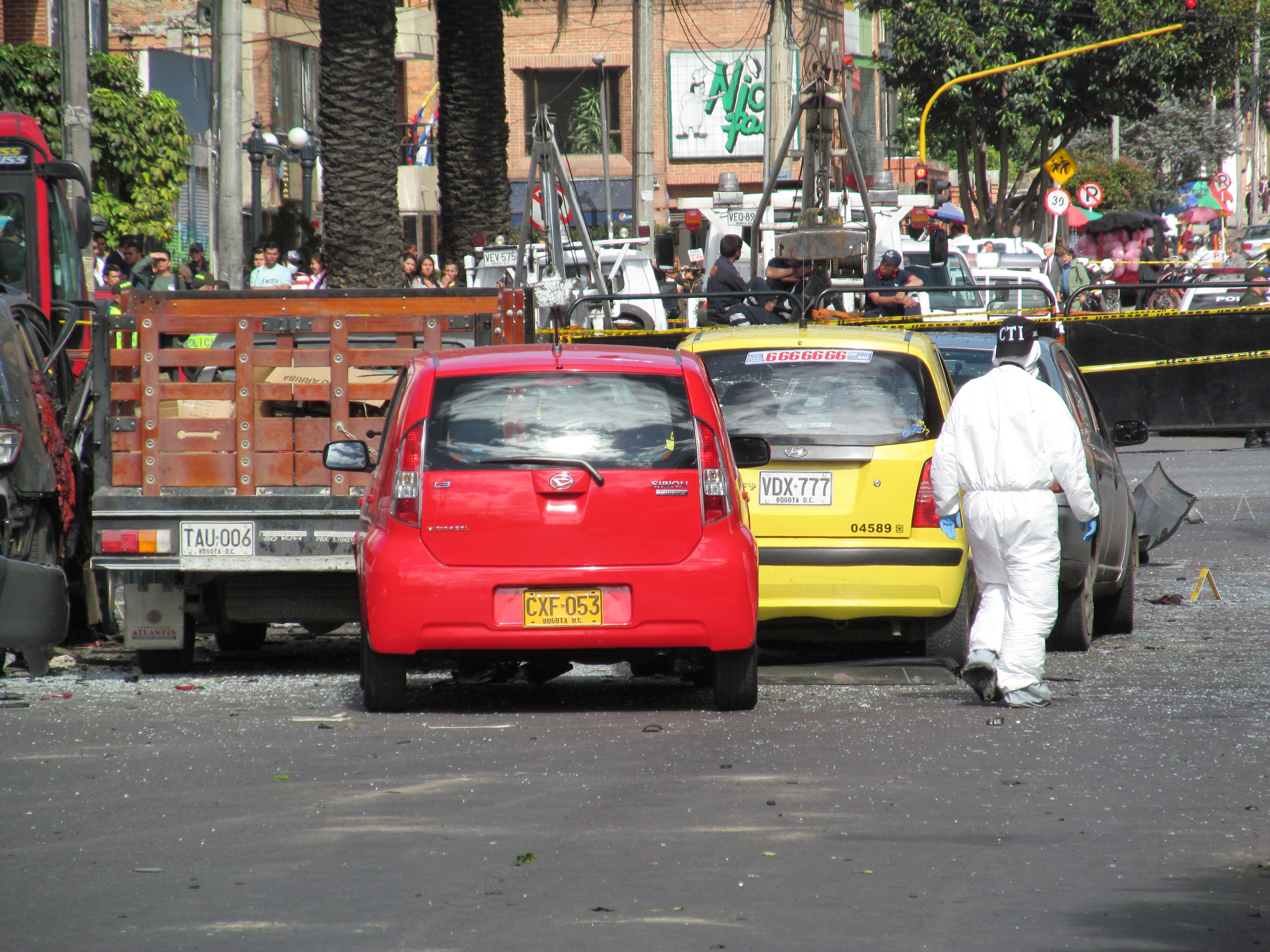
2012 car bombing in Bogotá targeting the former minister, Fernando Londoño

According to a study by Colombia's National Centre for Historical Memory, 220,000 people died in the conflict between 1958 and 2013, mostly civilians (177,307 civilians and 40,787 fighters) and more than five million civilians were forced from their homes between 1985 and 2012, generating the world's second largest population of internally displaced persons (IDPs). 17% of the population in Colombia has been a direct victim of the war. 2.3 million children have been displaced from their homes, and 45,000 children killed, according to national figures cited by UNICEF. In total, one in three of the 7.6 million registered victims of the conflict are children, and since 1985, 8,000 minors have disappeared.

In 2016, Colombia had a murder rate of 24.4 per 100,000 population, the lowest since 1974. The murder rate further decreased to 22.6 in 2020, though still among the highest in the world.

=== Illegal drug trade in Colombia ===
Colombia has had four major drug trafficking cartels which created a new social class and influenced aspects of Colombian culture. Coca, marijuana and other drugs had been part of the lifestyle of some Colombians, but the world demand of psychoactive drugs during the 1960s and 70s increased the production and processing of these in Colombia. Cocaine is produced at $1500/kilo in jungle labs and could be sold on the streets of America for as much as $80,000/kilo. The initial boom in production of drugs for export began with marijuana in the 1960s, followed by cocaine in the mid-1970s. The United States intervened in Colombia throughout this period, in an attempt to cut off the supply of these drugs.

Since the establishment of the war on drugs, the United States and European countries have provided financial, logistical, tactical and military aid to the government of Colombia, in order to implement plans to combat the illegal drug trade. The most notable of these programs has been the Plan Colombia which intended to combat organizations, such as the FARC guerrillas, who have controlled many coca-growing regions in Colombia over the past decades.

Despite Colombia being the world's leading producer of coca for many years, those plans slowly diminished the drug produced, to the extent that in 2010 the country reduced cocaine production by 60%, relative to the peak in 2000. In that same year, Peru surpassed Colombia as the main producer of coca leaves in the world. The level of drug related violence was halved, the country moved from being the most violent country in the world to have a homicide rate that is lower than Honduras, Jamaica, El Salvador, Venezuela, Guatemala, Trinidad and Tobago and South Africa.

=== Kidnapping ===
At the turn of the millennium Colombia had the highest rates of kidnapping in the world, a result of being one of the most cost-effective ways of financing for the guerrillas of the FARC and the ELN, and other armed groups. But the security situation improved and the groups involved have been weakened. The administration of President Uribe sought to professionalize the armed forces and engage them more fully in the counterinsurgency war; as a result, the armed groups have suffered a series of setbacks. Police in Colombia say the number kidnapped has fallen 92% since 2000. Common criminals are now the perpetrators of the majority of kidnappings. By 2016, kidnappings in Colombia had declined to 205. One is more likely to encounter a Colombian army checkpoint, than an illegal guerrilla roadblock.

=== Corruption ===
Corruption in Colombia is a pervasive problem at many levels of government. A 2005 study published by Transparency for Colombia (Transparencia por Colombia) assessed the index of integrity of governments, assemblies and comptrollers at the departmental level and concluded that none of those dependencies scored an appropriate level of integrity. 51% were prone to high or very high levels of corruption.

Many institutions in Colombia have been the subject of administrative corruption. Large institutions that span across industries are example of major cases of corruption including: Ferrovias (national railroad administration), Caprecom (health care), Foncolpuertos (ports authority), Termorrio (energy), Dragacol (civil engineering), Chivor reservoir (water supply) and contracts with foreign companies such as Mexican ICA for the pavement of streets in Bogotá are just some of them.

=== Domestic violence ===
Domestic violence in Colombia is a serious problem. Judicial authorities may remove an abuser from the household and require therapy or re-education. The Institute for Legal Medicine and Forensic Science reported approximately 33,000 cases of domestic violence against women during 2006.

== Regional crime ==
=== Bogotá ===
Bogotá has gone to great lengths to change its crime rate and image with success, after being considered in the mid-90s to be one of the most violent cities in the world. In 1993 there were 4,352 intentional homicides at a rate of 81 per 100,000 people; in 2007, Bogotá suffered 1,401 murders at a rate of 19 per 100,000 inhabitants. This success was the result of a participatory and integrated security policy, "Comunidad Segura", that was first adopted in 1995 and continues to be enforced. Bogotá's violent crime rate is now lower than that of some US cities such as Indianapolis, Indiana. Though according to a 2011 article in the New York Times "street muggings and thefts on public transportation have surged since 2007", leading certain commentators to declare a crisis of security in the city.

=== Cali ===
Crime is a serious problem in Cali. As of 2006, there were 1,540 intentional homicides and 1,726 overall when including the metropolitan area. The rates for the city and metropolitan area were 62 and 63 per 100,000 respectively. By 2011 this had increased to 71 homicides per 100,000 inhabitants, which led commentators to declare a 'crisis of security'.

Between January and June 2011 there were 923 homicides in the inner city of Cali, which is a 5% increase compared to 2010. The surge in violence in Cali in 2011 was partly attributed to what was described as an ongoing 'mafia war' between the 'neo-paramilitary' groups Los Rastrojos and Usuga Clan. Los Rastrojos are considered the 'heirs' of the Cali Cartel and the Usuga Clan have their roots in Colombia's atlantic coast. Los Rastrojos were accused of committing at least 80 murders in Cali in 2011.

According to Colombia's most influential weekly magazine, Semana, there are over 1,700 assassins working for various groups in the city. As of 2011 urban militias, known as Milicias Populares, of the Revolutionary Armed Forces of Colombia are active in the city and surrounding areas. Locals and foreigners have been advised by the DAS to take caution due to the risk of planted bombs and kidnappings.

The metropolitan police and the army have taken action to stop high-profile bomb attacks against military and administrative centers, such as the FARC attacks against Cali's Palace of Justice in 2008 and 2010. These FARC militias in the Cali metropolitan area are thought to number more than 1000, and have caused serious concern among the authorities as they stepped up activity in 2011.

In 2016 and 2017, Cali experienced a drop in homicide rate, lowering to 51 per 100,000 inhabitants.

=== Medellín ===
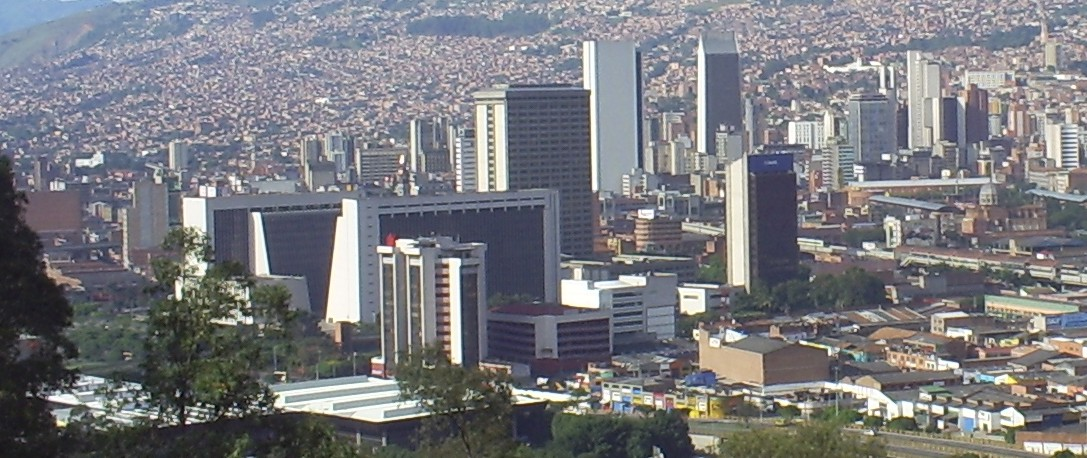
Central Medellín

Medellín was once known as the most violent city in the world, a result of an urban war set off by the drug cartels at the end of the 1980s. As the home of the Medellín Cartel funded by Pablo Escobar, the city was victim of the terror caused by the war between the cartel, and competing organizations such as "El Cartel del Valle". However, after the death of Escobar, crime rates in the city began to decrease.

Throughout the rest of the 1990s crime rates remained relatively high, although gradually declining from the worst years. In October 2002, President Álvaro Uribe ordered the military to carry out "Operation Orion," whose objective was to disband the urban militias of the FARC and the AUC. Between 2003 and 2006 the demobilization of the remaining urban militias of the AUC was completed, with more than 3,000 armed men giving up their weapons.

After the disbanding of the main paramilitary groups, many members of such organizations have been known to have reorganized into criminal bands known commonly as Aguilas Negras. These groups have gained notoriety in Medellín for calling upon curfews for the underage population, and been known to distribute fliers announcing the social cleansing of prostitutes, drug addicts, and alcoholics. The extradition of paramilitary leader Don Berna sparked a crime wave with a sharp increase in killings.

There were 33% more murders in 2008 than 2007, with an increase from 654 to 871 violent deaths. This increased further by over 200% in 2009 to 2,899 violent deaths, or about 110 deaths per 100,000 people, 2.5 times the average homicide rate in Colombia and 20 times the average homicide rate in the United States for that same year. An average of 9 people were killed every day in 2009. There is a disparity in crime rates by neighborhoods, with virtually no homicides in El Poblado to areas with open gunfights in the outskirts. Generally, crime rates increase the further the neighborhood is from the center.

In contrast to lower homicide rates, armed robberies increased by 19% from 2018 to 2019, to more than 21000 per year. Rates of armed robbery in Medellin were increasing every year since 2011, when 1584 such crimes were reported. From 2016 to 2017, armed robberies increased from 8900 to more than 17,700 cases, partly due to a new law that allows citizens to report armed robberies themselves. The city's downtown area is the most frequent location for armed robbery, because hundreds of thousands of people visit every day to go to work. However, robberies in affluent districts like Poblado and Laureles / Estadio have also been on the rise.

By 2015, the homicide rate had fallen to 20 per 100,000 people, the lowest rate in decades. By 2019, the homicide rate had risen to 24.8 per 100,000 people.

=== Buenaventura ===
Buenaventura has had a notorious history plagued by the Colombian armed conflict, drug trafficking, violence, and the presence of guerrilla and paramilitary groups. Due to the violence of Buenaventura, The New York Times published an article titled: "Cocaine Wars Make Port Colombia’s Deadliest City".

Colombian authorities have seized almost US$28 million in cash from drug kingpins. The money found was in shipping containers sent from Manzanillo, Colima (Mexico) and Houston (United States), that belonged to brothers Luis Enrique and Javier Antonio Calle Serna, also known as the ‘Combas’.

The amount of reported homicides doubled between 2008 and 2010. The murder rate is 24 times that of New York City, making it a crime rate of 175. To counter the violence, the Colombian government set up a marine special forces unit in the worst area of the city.

=== Barranquilla ===
In Barranquilla, in 2007 there were 348 homicides compared to 391 in 2006, a decrease of 11% over the previous year. In Colombia, in 2007 the homicide rate per 100,000 population from Barranquilla (22) was only exceeded by those of Cali (57), Bucaramanga (32) and Medellín (30). In the six years from 2002 to 2007, however, the number of homicides declined, with the lowest number occurring in 2007 compared to a peak of 483 killings in 2003. Thugs (42.2%), fights (31.6%) and robberies (14.94%) accounted for the main types of homicide in the city. Historically, the days when most homicides occur are Saturday and Sunday, but in 2007 there was a uniform distribution (approximately 15%) on all days.

85.2% of homicides are by firearm; Barranquilla and Cali in 2007 recorded the highest percentage of homicides involving firearms in Colombia. Most homicides are concentrated in the centre and south of the city. Another type of crime in Barranquilla that also showed a growth trend over the past two years was theft, commercial entities (713 in 2007, 630 in 2006, mainly in the north and centre), residences (528 in 2007, 467 in, 2006 mainly in the north), financial institutions (20 in 2006 21 in 2007 mainly in the north) and people (2,692 in 2007, 2,146 in 2006, mainly in the centre, north and south).

== Crime prevention ==
In 2011, President Juan Manuel Santos launched a "Borders for Prosperity" plan to fight poverty and combat violence from illegal armed groups along Colombia's borders through social and economic development, having spent as much as $32 million on infrastructure, education, agricultural development and governance by 2014. According to the International Crisis Group, the plan "appears to be having a positive impact, especially in marginalized communities with little or no state presence".

== See also ==
- Organised crime in Colombia
- Security issues in Colombia
- Terrorism in Colombia
