= Óscar Tulio Lizcano =

Colombian politician

Óscar Tulio Lizcano González
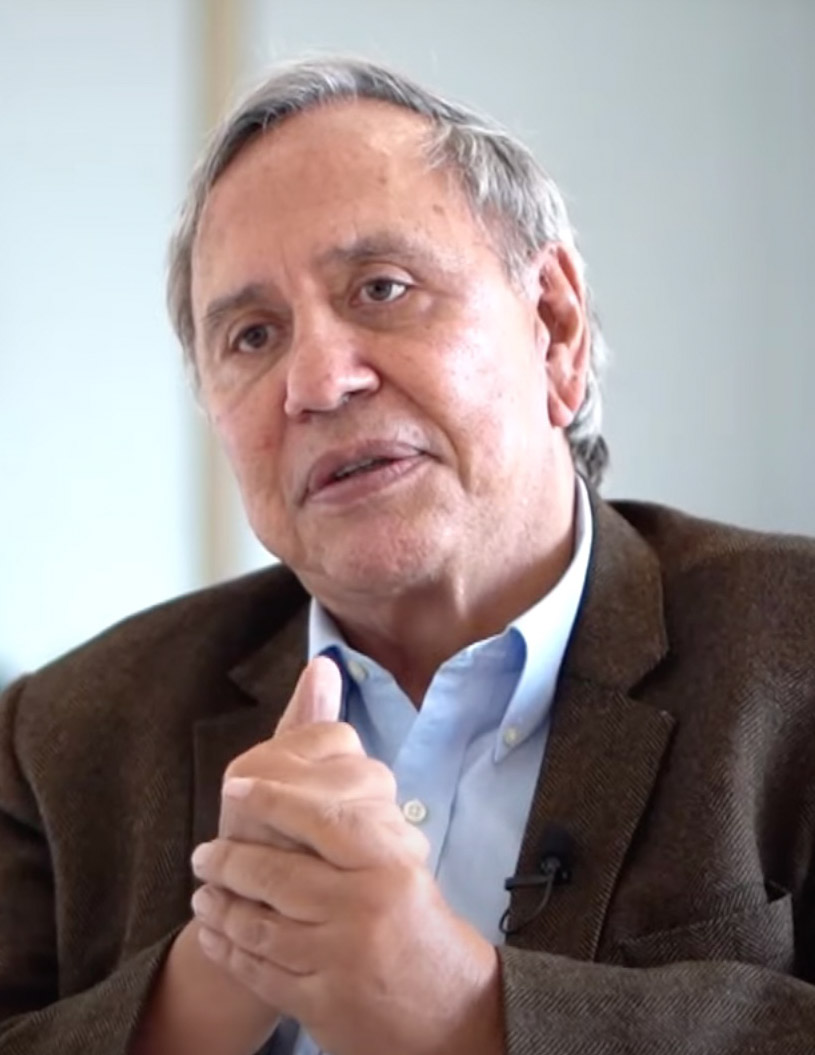

Member of the Colombian Chamber of Representatives
- In office July 20, 2000 – August 5, 2000
- Constituency: Caldas
- In office July 20, 2018 – July 20, 2022

Personal details
- Born: June 28, 1946 (age 80) Cartago, Valle del Cauca, Colombia
- Party: Conservative
- Spouse: Martha Arango Casas
- Children: Mauricio Lizcano Arango; Juan Carlos Lizcano Arango
- Occupation: Politician
- Profession: Economist

Óscar Tulio Lizcano (born June 28, 1947, Cartago, Valle del Cauca, Colombia) is a Colombian conservative politician and a member of the Colombia Conservative Party who was a congressman for the Department of Caldas (a position now taken by his son). On August 5, 2000, while serving as congressman, Lizcano was kidnapped in Riosucio, Caldas, by the Revolutionary Armed Forces of Colombia (FARC) guerrilla group and held for 8 years. On October 23, 2008, he escaped captivity with the help of one of his jailers who decided to desert due to the immense pressure inflicted by the Colombian army on the rebel group.

According to correspondence sent by Lizcano he was continuously moved through different guerrilla camps in the Caldas countryside and was suffering from malaria.

== See also ==
- Kidnappings in Colombia
- List of political hostages held by FARC
- FARC-EP
