= Julio Sánchez Cristo =

Colombian radio presenter (born 1959)

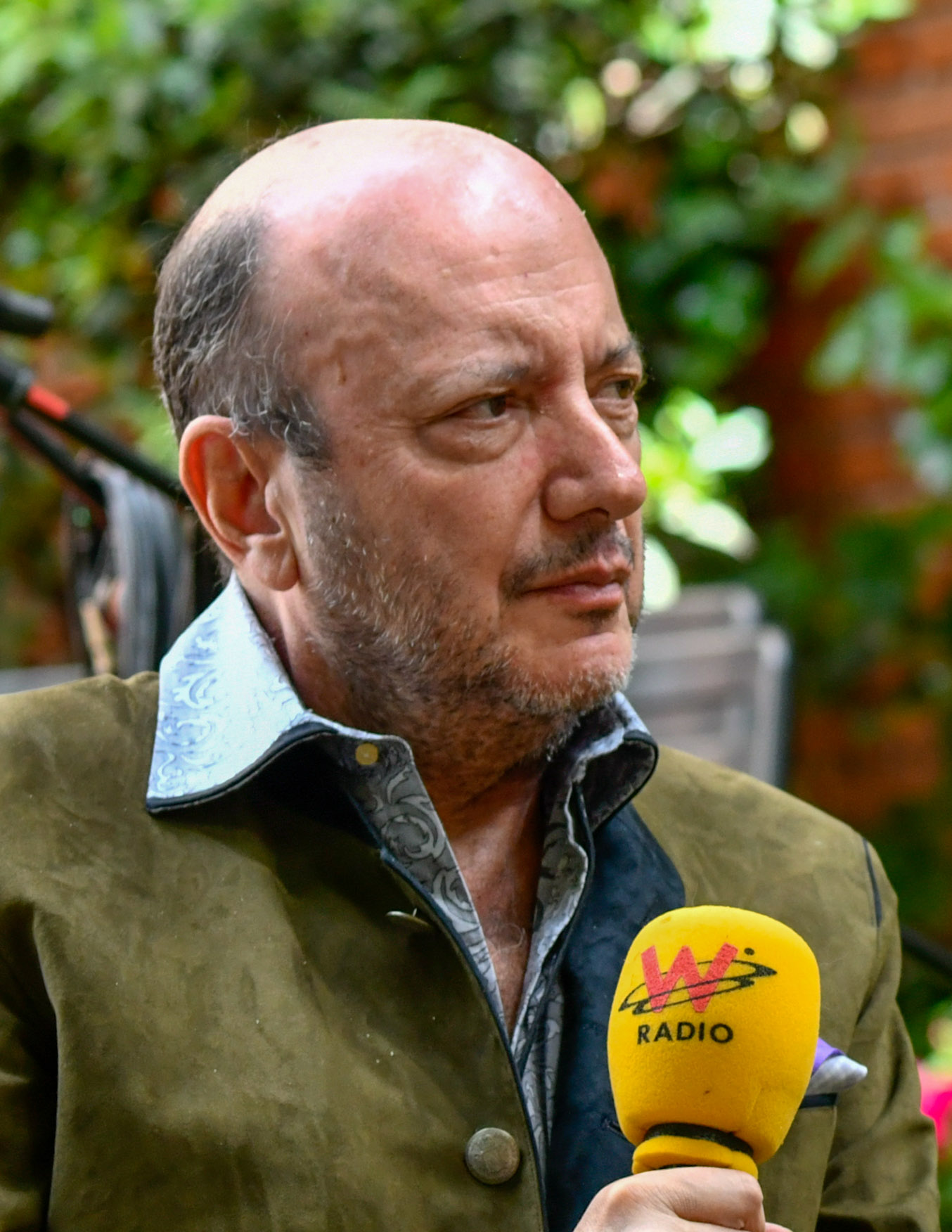
- Born: January 9, 1959 (age 67); Bogotá, D.C., Colombia
- Other name: Julito
- Presenting career
- Show: La W. 6 AM W
- Station: Syndicated
- Time slot: Monday-Friday 05:00-12:00 COT
- Style: Radio personality, interviewer
- Country: Colombia
- Previous shows: La FM (1996-2003); Viva FM (1991-1996)
- Website: www.facebook.com/pages/Julio-Sanchez-Cristo/45728764201?ref=ts

Audio excerpt of Julio Sanchez

Julio Sánchez Cristo (born 9 January 1959) is a Colombian radio personality. He is best known for his morning news program 6 AM W broadcast by Colombian Radio Network, Caracol radio.

Sánchez has worked in most of major mass media and is widely recognized as one of the most important journalists in Colombia. He is regarded as a keen interviewer and has been awarded all the journalism awards granted in Colombia.

Sánchez stands as the lead-in interviewer in many investigative pieces during broadcasting and then hands out to other lower profile journalists which might be the ones fully developing the stories. W Radio in Colombia and most media in particular have become the last resort for many citizens to expose abuse by different sectors of society, they might include the government, authorities and private individuals that take advantage of people with less resources. Sanchez in particular is willing to confront individuals whose actions are under moral or social scrutiny.

== Radio history ==
Julio Sánchez begun his career at his father's broadcasting company. Sánchez intended to enter the Jorge Tadeo Lozano University, however most of his journalistic experience was shaped by his empirical approach (See Peter Jennings for other examples of empiric journalists).

Sánchez major influence comes from his professional mentor, Colombian journalist Yamid Amat, with whom he worked in Caracol Radio.

Sánchez worked with Colombian radio station Caracol Estéreo (predecessor of W Radio) hosting its morning news show Viva FM from 1991 to 1996. In 1996 he moved his show to La FM, a station owned by RCN Radio. In 2003 he came back to Caracol Radio's W Radio, which is currently owned by the Spanish group PRISA.

== Morning radio show ==
Julio Sánchez currently hosts the morning show La W in Colombia's W Radio. The show is syndicated and can be heard in Venezuela, Panama, Ecuador, United States (east coast), and Spain.
