= La FM =

Colombian radio station

La FM Bogotá
Colombia
- Broadcast area: Bogotá and central Colombia
- Frequency: 94.9 MHz
- Branding: HJMO

Programming
- Format: News / talk / pop

Ownership
- Owner: RCN Radio

History
- First air date: July 8, 1996

Technical information
- Repeater: 770 AM (HJJX)

Links
- Website: http://www.lafm.com.co/

La FM is a Colombian news/talk/pop music radio station, founded in July 1996 by RCN Radio. Until the mid-2000s (decade), it was a news/talk/adult contemporary station.

In Bogotá, it replaced tropical station Rumba Estéreo in order to bring Julio Sánchez Cristo to host its then brand-new morning show from Caracol Radio's Caracol Estéreo. After Sánchez Cristo returned to Caracol, at the time owned by Spanish group PRISA, in 2003, television journalist Claudia Gurisatti became a La FM presenter until 2007. Later came Vicky Dávila is the main host of the Noticiero de La FM, Hassan Nassar and in 2018, former CNN anchor Luis Carlos Vélez became its host and news director.

Starting August 4, 2025, the station was restructured to serve as RCN Radio new flagship station, taking over the frequencies previously occupied by the network nationwide. The musical offering it had broadcast until then was transferred to La FM Plus, which began broadcasting on August 1, 2025.
