= 6 AM W =

Colombian radio program

- Genre: News, variety
- Running time: Monday through Friday 05:00-12:00 COT
- Country of origin: Colombia
- Home station: Caracol Radio; W Radio (simulcast)
- Starring: Julio Sánchez Cristo, Alberto Casas Santamaría, Félix de Bedout
- Created by: Julio Sánchez Cristo y Alberto Casas Santamaría
- Executive producer: Juan Luis Cebrián
- Original release: June, 2003 – 9 January 2026 (as La W)
- Website: wradio.com.co

La W is also used to refer to W Radio, the station where this programme airs, as well as other stations using the W Radio brand.

6 AM W (until 9 January 2026 La W) is a Colombian radio program, broadcast since 2003 on weekdays on W Radio and syndicated to stations in Panama, United States, and Spain. It is presented by Julio Sánchez Cristo.

The programme features different topics, mostly current events, national and international news. The show has journalists on the world's major cities and continually reports about events that take place at the time the show is being broadcast; those events can be cultural in nature or events that because of their importance make news.

Julio Sánchez Cristo has two sidekick hosts, Alberto Casas Santamaría, whom he has worked in radio for a long time, a former minister and diplomat, and a well known media personality in Colombia, and Félix de Bedout, a well recognized journalist with an extensive career in various media, most notably being host on the TV newscast NTC Noticias.

The show is conformed by a staff of journalists reporting from different cities in Europe, Latin America and the US. The show also features jazz and pop.

Sánchez Cristo is popular among his audience, spending a good part of the show allowing listeners to talk live by phone from different cities in Colombia, Latin America or from the US. However, he has been strongly criticized for cutting people short at the middle of their talk. Some people criticize Mr. Sánchez for being too superficial and elitist.

La W is the successor of Viva FM, itself a programme created also by Sánchez Cristo for the then adult contemporary station Caracol Estéreo (forerunner of W Radio) in 1991. Sánchez would move to RCN Radio's La FM in 1996.

Since 13 January 2026 the programme, now named 6 AM W, is simulcast both on W Radio and Caracol Radio's main network after PRISA Media decided to consolidate the two networks into the second one. W Radio will simulcast a few programmes and devote the rest of its programming to music and sports.

== Syndication ==
- Colombia: W Radio and Caracol Radio (Bogotá, Medellín, Cali, Barranquilla, Manizales, Armenia, Pereira, Cúcuta, Duitama, Tunja, Bucaramanga, Cartagena de Indias, Villavicencio)
- Panama: Caracol América (900 AM)
- United States:
  - Miami: WSUA
  - New York City: WPAT
  - Orlando: WNTF
  - Phoenix: KIDR
- Spain:
  - Madrid: América Estéreo 103.9 FM (formerly on Radio Intercontinental 918 AM)
