= National security of Colombia =

Security issues of Colombia

This article covers national and international security issues in Colombia.

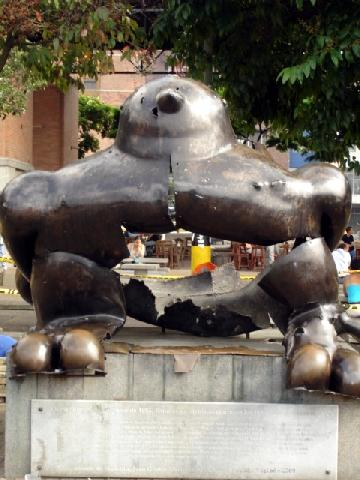
Bird ( By Fernando Botero) was destroyed by a terrorist attack in 1997, Medellín where 17 people died. The remains of the sculpture are displayed in San Antonio Square as a memorial for the victims.

== External threats ==
Colombia does not face any known foreign threats. The only neighbor that might pose a potential military challenge over as-yet unresolved territorial disputes relating to the maritime boundary, where there may be oilfields, would be Venezuela. The two countries have not allowed the occasional security incidents involving Colombian guerrillas and paramilitaries along their long common border to escalate into a serious issue since both nations concluded a bilateral free-trade agreement in 1991.

Cross-border trade links between Colombia and Venezuela were solidified in July 2004, although the relationship was previously strong, with an agreement to build a US$320 million natural gas pipeline between the two countries. As a friendly gesture on that occasion, President Álvaro Uribe canceled the planned purchase of French made AMX-30 tanks from Spain and their deployment on the border with Venezuela.

== Internal threats ==
Despite endemic violence stemming from left-wing guerrilla activity, paramilitary groups, and drug traffickers, constitutional order and institutional stability have prevailed. Nevertheless, the country’s political and social foundations have been undermined by the violence and corruption associated with the enormous wealth created by the drug cartels. Most Colombian government institutions have a reputation for inefficient, corrupt, and bureaucratic management, with the notable exceptions of the Central Bank, Ministry of Finance, and some other agencies responsible for economic policy formulation.

Common crime is rampant and often carried out with impunity. Officially registered homicides in Colombia reached a historic record of 28,837 in 2002, but declined by 20 percent in 2003 to 23,013. Criminal bands specializing in kidnapping, extortion, and robbery target businesses and civilians. Guerrilla and paramilitary groups were responsible for about three quarters of kidnappings as of 2007. Police in Colombia say the number of people kidnapped fell 92% between 2000 and 2016. As of 2016, common criminals were the perpetrators of the overwhelming majority of kidnappings. By the year 2016, the number of kidnappings in Colombia had declined to 205 and it has continued to decline. Colombia registered a homicide rate of 24.4 per 100,000 in 2016, the lowest since 1974. The 40-year low in murders came the same year that the Colombian government signed a peace agreement with the FARC.

Activities by foreign terrorist or drug-trafficking groups in Colombia have been minimal, consisting mostly of criminal activities involving Maicao-based Hezbollah members or international crime groups, such as the Russian Mafia, which was last reported to have supplied the Revolutionary Armed Forces of Colombia (Fuerzas Armadas Revolucionarias de Colombia—FARC) with sophisticated weapons in 2000. In 1998 an Islamic terrorist was deported for engaging in illegal transactions with the FARC.

In 2011, President Juan Manuel Santos launched a "Borders for Prosperity" plan to fight poverty and combat violence from illegal armed groups along Colombia's borders (including guerrillas, paramilitaries, and BACRIMs) through social and economic development, having spent as much as $32 million on infrastructure, education, agricultural development and governance by 2014. According to the International Crisis Group, the plan "appears to be having a positive impact, especially in marginalized communities with little or no state presence".

=== Guerrillas ===
Two major guerrilla organizations, the Revolutionary Armed Forces of Colombia (Fuerzas Armadas Revolucionarias de Colombia—FARC) and the National Liberation Army (Ejército de Liberación Nacional—ELN), plus a smaller Popular Liberation Army (Ejército Popular de Liberación or EPL) group continue to be active. In 1996–98 the FARC and ELN extended their presence in the national territory and scored some strategic gains against the poorly led armed forces by besieging and easily overrunning isolated military garrisons. The Pastrana government responded in November 1998 by granting the FARC a 51,000-square-kilometer demilitarized zone (DMZ) in southeast Colombia as a concession in exchange for beginning peace talks. However, the FARC used the DMZ as a haven to increase illicit drug crops, transport military equipment and provisions, and negotiate kidnappings and extortions. After peace negotiations collapsed in early 2002, security forces retook the DMZ on February 20.

Until 2002, the armed conflict was fought primarily in the countryside. Since then, the FARC, having honed its remote-control bombing techniques with the aid of Europe-based terrorist groups, has expanded its operations to include occasional indiscriminate terrorist bombings and other attacks in Bogotá. Numerous bombings have been attributed to the FARC. One such bombing was the El Nogal club bombing in 2003. FARC itself denied that any of its members were involved in this attack.

With the support of the United States, the administration of President Uribe has sought to professionalize the armed forces and to engage them more fully in the counterinsurgency war; as a result, the armed groups have suffered a series of setbacks. The president’s plan includes the formation of platoons of “peasant soldiers,” or locally recruited men, to provide guard duty around previously unguarded municipalities in support of the police and regular troops. By August 2004, more than 8,000 peasant soldiers had been recruited and trained, and plans called for increasing that number to 15,000 across the country by 2006.

In 2003 the FARC had an estimated force of as many as 18,000 active members plus a 5,000-member urban militia; the ELN had an estimated 3,500 members plus an urban militia; and the EPL had an estimated 500 members. In August 2003, under increasing pressure by the armed forces, the FARC and the ELN announced an alliance. This partnership had already been a reality in certain parts of the country where ELN and FARC units fought side by side and has been broadened to include the whole country.

The alliance has not made any significant difference yet, but in the long term, the two groups pose a much greater threat jointly than they do separately, as the military power of the FARC and the political strength of the ELN complement each other. At January 2009, estimates point that the policy of the Uribe Administration of demobilization promises and intense pressure from the Army has left half of the recruits the FARC had at the start of the decade. Calculations point to 7,000 members, and each day more guerrilla fighters demobilize and leave FARC.

The Uribe government has rejected the guerrilla demands for prisoner exchanges and demilitarized zones as a precondition for peace talks. By 2004 stepped-up government actions against the guerrillas with the help of significant U.S. military aid had kept the guerrillas mostly withdrawn into the countryside, while government efforts to improve the economy and reduce cocaine production were showing results. Although it is generally believed that the left-wing guerrillas have little chance of taking power in Colombia, they continue to engage in terrorist activities.

Analysts believe that it would take years for the armed forces to make any significant progress in reducing the territory held by the armed groups, since the Uribe administration progress in this topic has progressed far beyond expectations, where at this point, FARC forces are in retreat plan to the jungles and are constantly attacked by the Colombian army.

=== Right-wing illegal paramilitary forces ===
The largest paramilitary organization, the United Self-Defense Forces of Colombia (Autodefensas Unidas de Colombia—AUC), had an estimated 10,600 members. It operated as a loose confederation of disparate paramilitary groups, the largest of which was the Peasant Self-Defense Forces of Córdoba and Urabá (Autodefensas Campesinas de Córdoba y Urabá—ACCU). Other important paramilitary organizations that existed before the 2004 peace talks included the Cacique Nutibara Bloc (Bloque Cacique Nutibara—BCN), the Central Bolivar Bloc (Bloque Central Bolívar—BCB), and the Middle Magdalena Bloc (Bloque del Magdalena Medio—BMM). These groups were involved in battling the guerrillas and terrorizing their supporters or sympathizers among the civilian population.

The Uribe administration opened formal negotiations with the AUC in July 2003 with the goal of demobilization of the AUC. Obstacles included immunity from prosecution for their crimes and U.S. extradition warrants for AUC leaders, several of whom have been indicted for drug trafficking. Nevertheless, at the start of October 2004, the AUC announced unilaterally a partial disarmament, with 3,000 of its fighters located along the border with Venezuela disarming by the end of the year, and now the entire organization is demobilized.

A small faction of ex-paramilitary people called the "Águilas Negras" returned to action, although compared with what the AUC were, it comprises a decline of over 92% of their forces. The "Águilas Negras", has plunged into a different line of action from the AUC, as they have engaged in cooperation with FARC in some drug operations.

== See also ==
- Foreign relations of Colombia
- Kidnappings in Colombia
- Narcotrafficking in Colombia
