= W Radio (Colombia) =

Coordinates: 4.598056°N 74.075833°W

Colombia
- Frequency: 690 kHz 99.9 MHz
- Branding: HJCZ (AM), HJLN (FM)

Programming
- Format: News / talk
- Affiliations: Caracol Radio

Ownership
- Owner: Caracol Radio (PRISA)

History
- First air date: 7 April 2003
- Last air date: 13 January 2026
- Former names: Punto Azul (1973–1976); Caracol Estéreo (1976–2003)

Links
- Website: wradio.com.co

W Radio Colombia was a news/talk/adult contemporary Colombian radio network, part of Caracol Radio. It started in 1973 as adult contemporary station Caracol Estéreo. It is part of the W Radio system, with networks in Mexico, Los Angeles (United States), Panama, and transmitted as far away as Chile.

The station is best known for its morning news show La W, presented by Julio Sánchez Cristo, Alberto Casas Santamaría, and Camila Zuluaga.

== History ==
Before 1990, FM radio in Colombia was almost exclusively devoted to music, because a 1975 decree issued by the Ministry of Communications limited to 60 minutes a day the time an FM station could dedicate to "informative, journalistic, or sports programming." These restrictions were relaxed in the early 1990s, allowing FM stations to broadcast news.

Viva FM was one of the pioneering morning news shows on the FM band, starting in 1991 on Caracol Estéreo, presented by Julio Sánchez Cristo. Sánchez Cristo left in 1996 to RCN Radio, creating La FM, a similar programme on the then newly created homonymous station. Viva FM continued with the direction of Roberto Pombo until 2003, when Sánchez came back to the then brand new W Radio.

Since January 13, 2026, it has merged with Caracol Radio to create W Caracol, a station that will expand its news coverage and provide more information throughout the country.
