= Alan Jara =

Alan Edmundo Jara Urzola
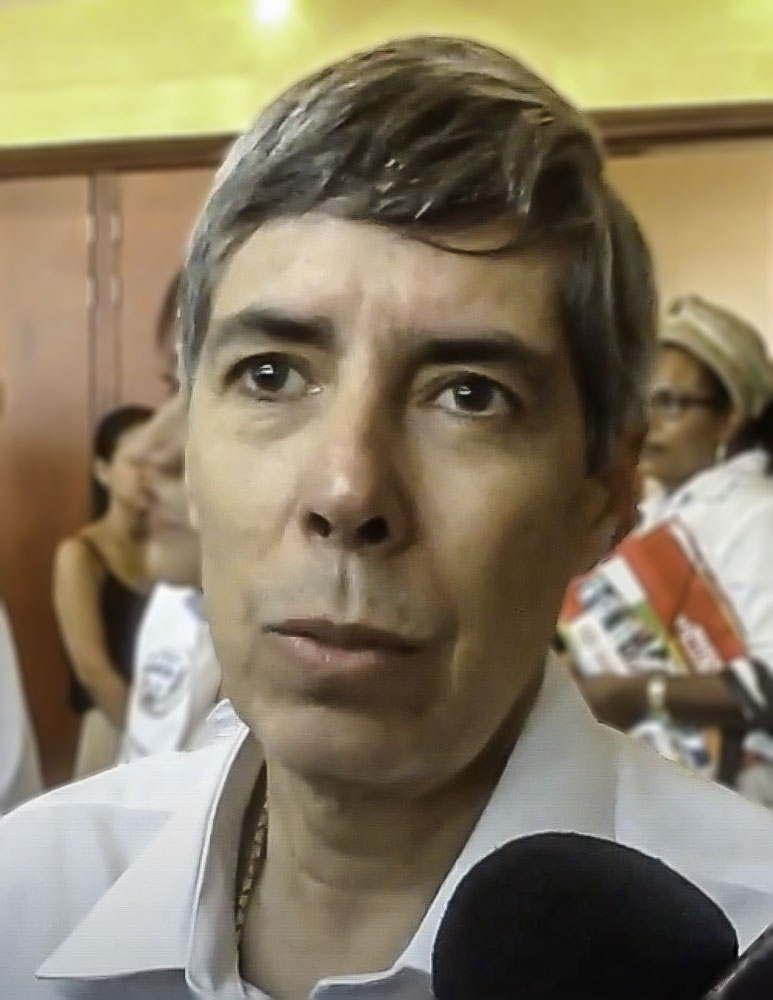

35th Governor of Meta Department
- Incumbent
- Assumed office 1 January 2012
- Preceded by: Darío Vásquez Sánchez

29th Governor of Meta Department
- In office 1 January 1998 – 31 December 2000
- Preceded by: Alfonso Ortiz Bautista
- Succeeded by: Luis Carlos Torres Rueda

25th Governor of Meta Department
- In office 1 May 1990 – 9 June 1990
- Preceded by: Plinio Hernán Castro Castro
- Succeeded by: Eduardo Fernández

Personal details
- Born: July 17, 1957 (age 69) Bogotá, Colombia
- Party: Liberal
- Spouse: Claudia Rugeles
- Children: 1
- Education: Kyiv National University of Construction and Architecture (BESc, MESc)
- Profession: Civil Engineer

Alan Edmundo Jara Urzola (born 17 July 1957) is a Colombian civil engineer, and former Governor of the Department of Meta. He was kidnapped by the Revolutionary Armed Forces of Colombia (FARC) on July 15, 2001, and remained in captivity until he was released on February 3, 2009.
