= Freddy Padilla de León =

Freddy José Padilla de León
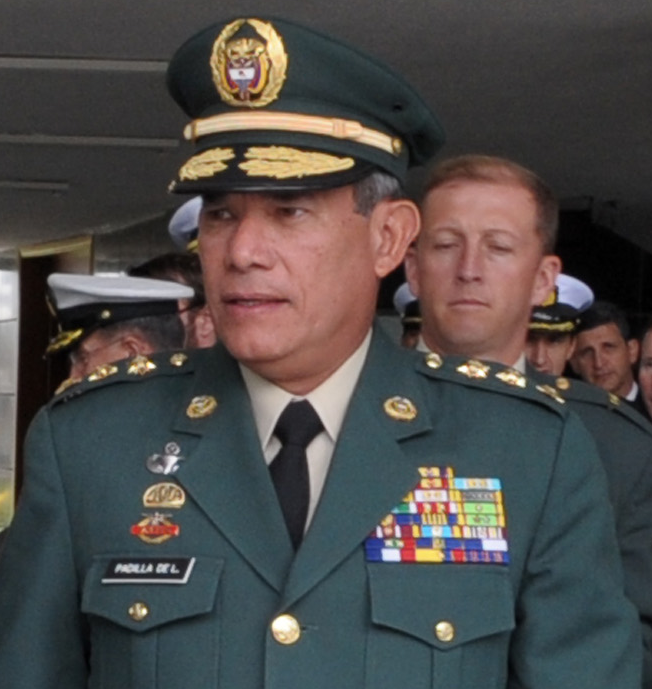

Colombia Ambassador to Austria
- Incumbent
- Assumed office 18 October 2010
- President: Juan Manuel Santos Calderón
- Preceded by: Rosso José Serrano Cadena

Colombia Ambassador to the Czech Republic
- Incumbent
- Assumed office 11 April 2011
- President: Juan Manuel Santos Calderón
- Preceded by: Rosso José Serrano Cadena

Colombia Ambassador to Hungary
- Incumbent
- Assumed office 31 May 2011
- President: Juan Manuel Santos Calderón
- Preceded by: Rosso José Serrano Cadena

Colombia Ambassador to Slovenia
- Incumbent
- Assumed office 14 July 2011
- President: Juan Manuel Santos Calderón
- Preceded by: Rosso José Serrano Cadena

Colombia Ambassador to Slovakia
- Incumbent
- Assumed office 12 July 2011
- President: Juan Manuel Santos Calderón
- Preceded by: Rosso José Serrano Cadena

Colombian Minister of National Defence
- In office 23 May 2009 – 7 August 2009
- President: Álvaro Uribe Vélez
- Preceded by: Juan Manuel Santos Calderón
- Succeeded by: Gabriel Silva Luján

Personal details
- Born: 10 October 1948 (age 77) Montería, Bolívar, Colombia
- Spouse: Adda Miryam Hodges
- Children: Freddy Padilla Hodges; Johanna María Padilla Hodges; Diana Padilla Hodges; Adda Padilla Hodges; Mariana Padilla Hodges
- Education: Pontifical Xavierian University (BSc, MA)
- Profession: Industrial Engineer

Military service
- Allegiance: Colombia
- Branch/service: National Army of Colombia
- Years of service: 1966-2010
- Rank: General
- Commands: General Commander of the Armed Forces of Colombia; Colombian Army Chief of Staff; General Inspector of the Armed Forces; Colombian Army Chief of Operations (a.i.); Director of the Colombian Army School of Engineers; 12th Battalion of Engineers
- Battles/wars: Colombian armed conflict (1964–present)

General Freddy José Padilla de León (Spanish pronunciation: [ˈfɾeði paˈðiʝa]; born 10 October 1948) is a retired General of the Army of Colombia and currently serves as Ambassador of Colombia to Austria and Permanent Representative to the United Nations Office at Vienna. Prior to this diplomatic post General Padilla served as the General Commander of the Armed Forces of Colombia from 2006 to 2010, and as such assumed the Ministry of National Defence ad interim in 2009.

== Ambassadorship ==
As Ambassador to Austria, Gen. Padilla is also accredited as Resident Representative to the various United Nations programmes and agencies located at the United Nations Office at Vienna. He presented his Letters of Credence to the Executive Director of the United Nations Office on Drugs and Crime, Yuri Fedotov on 13 October, to the Director General of the International Atomic Energy Agency, Yukiya Amano on 28 October, to the Director General of the United Nations Industrial Development Organization, Kandeh K. Yumkella on 1 November.

As Ambassador of Colombia to Austria, Gen Padilla is dually accredited as Non-Resident Ambassador to the Czech Republic, the Republic of Hungary, the Republic of Serbia, the Republic of Slovenia, the Republic of Slovakia, the Republic of Croatia, and the Republic of Turkey. In this capacity, Gen Padilla presented his Letters of Credence to the different heads of state or representatives, first to the President of the Czech Republic, Václav Klaus on 11 April 2011 at Prague Castle, then to the President of Hungary, Pál Schmitt on 31 May 2011, to the President of Slovakia, Ivan Gašparovič on 12 July at the Grassalkovich Palace, and to Igor Senčar, the Director-General of the Directorate for European Affairs and Bilateral Political Relations at the Slovenian Ministry of Foreign Affairs, on 14 July,
