= Out of Captivity =

2009 book by Gonsalves, Stansell and Howes

Out of Captivity: Surviving 1,967 Days in the Colombian Jungle
- Author: Marc Gonsalves, Keith Stansell, Thomas Howes, Gary Grozek
- Publication date: 2009

Out of Captivity, subtitled Surviving 1,967 Days in the Colombian Jungle, is a 2009 book written by Marc Gonsalves, Keith Stansell, and Thomas Howes with the assistance of author Gary Brozek. It narrates the nearly five and a half years they spent in the Colombian jungle as prisoners of the FARC, an insurgent organization, which accused them of being members of the CIA after their plane crashed in a mountainous region on February 13, 2003.

Marc Gonsalves, served in the USAF, Keith Stansell was a Marine, and Tom Howes is a professional pilot. They were civilian contractors working for the U.S. Department of Defense at the time of the accident.
