= Thomas Howes (hostage) =

American Northrop Grumman employee

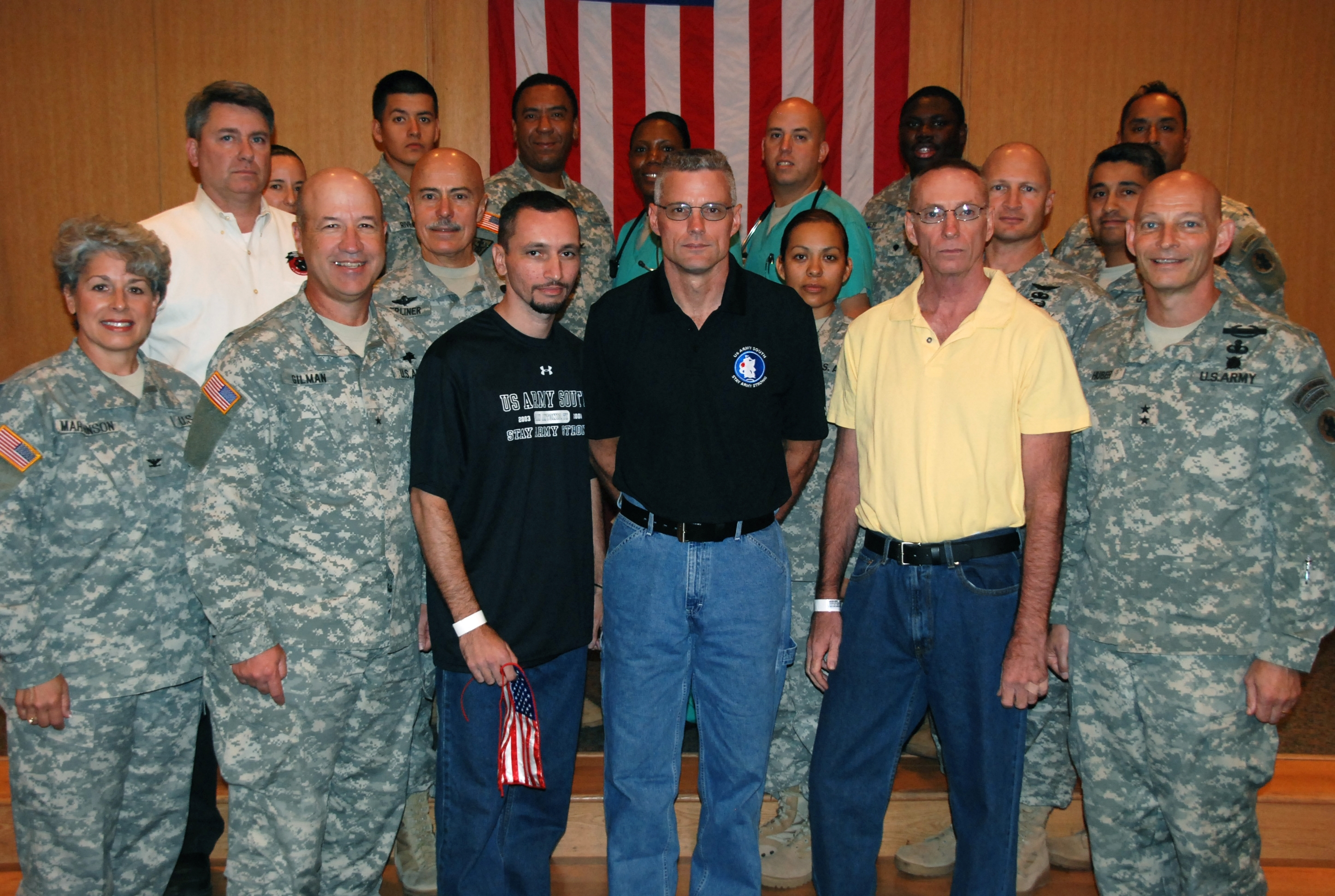
Howes (second from right) on July 4, 2008

Thomas Randolph Howes is an American Northrop Grumman employee who was captured by the Revolutionary Armed Forces of Colombia (FARC) and was held hostage from February 13, 2003, to July 2, 2008. He was rescued in Operation Jaque, along with two other American contractors, former Colombian senator Ingrid Betancourt, and eleven Colombian security personnel. On March 12, 2009, Howes, Keith Stansell and Marc Gonsalves were each awarded the Secretary of Defense Medal for the Defense of Freedom.

== Mission in Colombia ==
Thomas Howes was part of a team of a dozen or so pilots and technicians overseen by the U.S. Southern Command. Their operation was dubbed Southcom Reconnaissance System, and Northrop Grumman held the $8.6 million contract for the work.

As the program became increasingly successful, several former pilots and others familiar with the program said civilian managers pushed flight crews farther over the jungles, often at night and sometimes 300 miles from their base.

Their mission expanded, too, from locating targets in the illegal drug trade chosen by the American Embassy to keeping a look out for leftist guerrillas, including those of FARC.

By 2002, pilots began to worry about what they perceived to be the lack of power and speed of their planes - the single-engine Cessna Caravan - for a country as big and mountainous as Colombia.

Two pilots, Paul C. Hooper and Douglas C. Cockes, wrote letters in November and December 2002 to Northrop Grumman warning that flying single-engine planes was a recipe for disaster. The letters suggested that the Cessnas be replaced with twin-engine Beechcraft King Air 300s.

The planes were not replaced, and the two pilots resigned. After the two crashes, which temporarily halted the program, Northrop Grumman resumed the operation under a different name, the Colombia Surveillance System, using twin-engine planes.

After the first crash, the program was transferred to a newly created company, CIAO Inc.

== Abduction ==
Thomas Howes, Marc Gonsalves, and Keith Stansell were on a drug surveillance mission in Colombia's cocaine-producing southern jungle when their single engine Cessna plane crashed on February 13, 2003, on the territory controlled by FARC.

The American pilot, Tom Janis, and a Colombian military intelligence officer were led out by FARC gunmen and shot. The three surviving Americans, (Gonslaves, Stansell and Howes) were forced to march with the guerrillas, deeper and deeper into the jungle. After this, the three Americans' exact location was lost by US intelligence. Three different Americans associated with Northrop Grumman made an attempt to find the hostages by air but were all killed when their plane hit a tree.

Then Colombian journalist Jorge Botero was allowed to contact them and record a tape to prove that they were alive and well – and ready to be traded for imprisoned members of the FARC being held by the Colombian government.

== Publications ==
- Out of Captivity is a book authored by Marc Gonsalves, Keith Stansell, and Thomas Howes with the assistance of author Gary Brozek about their time spent as hostages of FARC guerrillas.

== See also ==
- List of political hostages held by FARC
