= Keith Stansell =

American Northrop Grumman employee

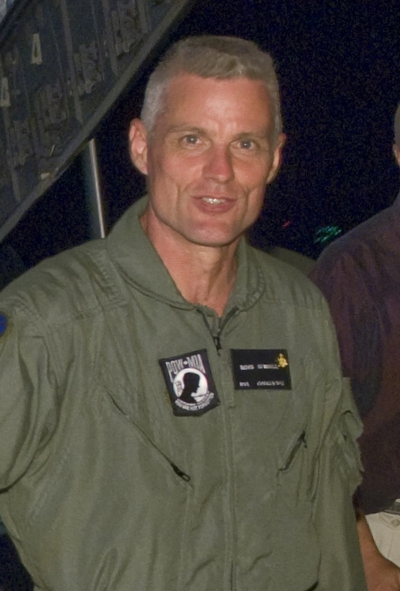
- Keith Stansell, July 2, 2008
- Born: Keith Donald Stansell; U.S.
- Occupation: Northrop Grumman employee
- Known for: Abduction and detention by FARC militants

Keith Donald Stansell is an American Northrop Grumman employee who was captured by the Revolutionary Armed Forces of Colombia (Fuerzas Armadas Revolucionarias de Colombia, or FARC) and was held hostage from February 13, 2003, to July 2, 2008. He was rescued in Operation Jaque, along with the two other American contractors, Ingrid Betancourt, and eleven members of the Colombian security forces. On March 12, 2009, Stansell, Marc Gonsalves and Thomas Howes were each awarded the Secretary of Defense Medal for the Defense of Freedom.

== Mission in Colombia ==
Keith Stansell was part of a team of a dozen or so pilots and technicians overseen by the U.S. Southern Command. Their operation was dubbed Southcom Reconnaissance System, and Northrop Grumman held the $8.6 million contract for the work.

As the program became increasingly successful, several former pilots and others familiar with the program said civilian managers pushed flight crews farther over the jungles, often at night and sometimes 300 miles from their base.

Their mission expanded, too, from locating targets in the illegal drug trade chosen by the American Embassy to keeping a look out for leftist guerrillas, including those of FARC.

By 2002, pilots began to worry about what they perceived to be the lack of power and speed of their planes - the single-engine Cessna Caravan - for a country as big and mountainous as Colombia.

Two pilots, Paul C. Hooper and Douglas C. Cockes, wrote letters in November and December 2002 to Northrop Grumman warning that flying single-engine planes was a recipe for disaster. The letters suggested that the Cessnas be replaced with twin-engine Beechcraft King Air 300s.

The planes were not replaced, and the two pilots resigned. After the two crashes, which temporarily halted the program, Northrop Grumman resumed the operation under a different name, the Colombia Surveillance System, using twin-engine planes.

After the first crash, the program was transferred to a newly created company, CIAO Inc.

== Abduction ==
Stansell, Thomas Howes and Marc Gonsalves were on a drug surveillance mission in Colombia's cocaine-producing southern jungle when their single engine Cessna plane crashed on February 13, 2003, on the territory controlled by FARC.

The American pilot, Tom Janis, and Colombian military intelligence officer Luis Alcides Cruz were led out by FARC gunmen and shot, execution style. The three surviving Americans, (Gonsalves, Stansell and Howes) were forced to march with the guerrillas, deeper and deeper into the jungle. After this, the three Americans' exact location was lost by US intelligence.

Three other Americans associated with Northrop Grumman made an attempt to find the hostages by air but were all killed when their plane hit a tree.

Then Colombian journalist Jorge Botero was allowed to contact the hostages and record a tape to prove that they were alive and well – and ready to be traded for imprisoned members of the FARC being held by the Colombian Government.

== In popular culture ==
- Out of Captivity is a book authored by Marc Gonsalves, Keith Stansell, and Thomas Howes with the assistance of author Gary Brozek about their time spent as hostages of FARC guerrillas.
- In season 12 of the docudrama series Locked Up Abroad (episode 7, "Jungle Crash"), Keith Stansell narrates a dramatization of his capture and imprisonment by FARC and eventual escape (N.B.: This series is aired in the U.S. on the National Geographic TV Channel as Locked Up Abroad).
- On August 25, 2025, Keith Stansell appeared as the featured guest on episode 230 of The Shawn Ryan Show. The nearly five-hour interview focused extensively on his time in captivity, recounting in vivid detail the conditions he endured, the psychological and physical struggles he faced, and the lasting challenges of reintegration after his release. Stansell’s conversation with host Shawn Ryan marked one of his longest and most in-depth public discussions, providing listeners with an intimate perspective on his ordeal and its aftermath.

== See also ==
- List of kidnappings
- List of political hostages held by FARC
- List of solved missing person cases (2000s)
