= Marc Gonsalves =

American Northrop Grumman employee (born 1972)

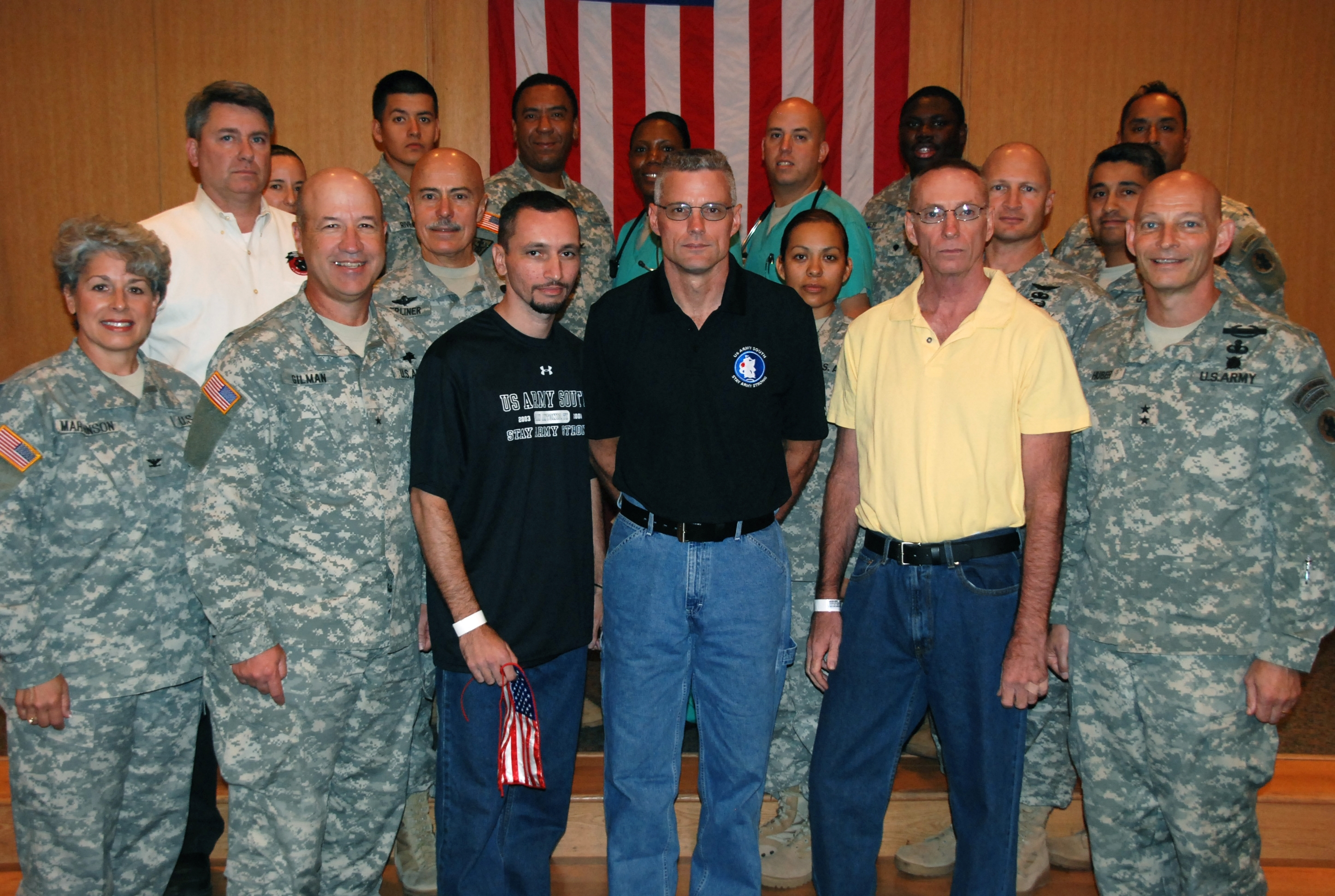
- Gonsalves (third from left) on July 4, 2008
- Born: Marc David Gonsalves; 1972 (age 53–54); Bristol, Connecticut, U.S.
- Occupation: Northrop Grumman employee
- Known for: Being abducted by FARC militants

Marc David Gonsalves (born 1972) is an American Northrop Grumman employee who was abducted by the Revolutionary Armed Forces of Colombia (FARC) and was held hostage from February 13, 2003, to July 2, 2008. He was rescued in Operation Jaque, along with the two other American contractors, Ingrid Betancourt, and eleven members of the Colombian security forces. On March 12, 2009, Gonsalves, Keith Stansell and Thomas Howes were each awarded the Secretary of Defense Medal for the Defense of Freedom.

== Biography ==
=== Early life and education ===
Marc Gonsalves is the son of George Gonsalves and Jo Rosano. He was raised in Bristol, Connecticut and has a brother.

=== Career ===
Gonsalves served as an imagery analyst in the United States Air Force for eight years prior to becoming a contractor employed by California Microwave Systems, a subsidiary of Northrop Grumman.

=== Marriage and children ===
Gonsalves and his ex-wife have three children.

== Mission in Colombia ==
Marc Gonsalves was part of a team of a dozen or so pilots and technicians overseen by the U.S. Southern Command. Their operation was dubbed the Southcom Reconnaissance System, and Northrop Grumman held the $8.6 million contract for the work. As the program became increasingly successful, several former pilots and others familiar with the program said civilian managers pushed flight crews farther over the jungles, often at night and sometimes 300 miles from their base.

Their mission expanded, too, from locating targets in the illegal drug trade chosen by the American Embassy to keeping a lookout for leftist terrorist guerrillas, who also delved in the drug trade, including those of FARC.

By 2002, pilots began to worry about what they perceived to be the lack of power and speed of their planes – the single-engine Cessna Caravan – for a country as big and mountainous as Colombia.

Two pilots, Paul C. Hooper and Douglas C. Cocker, wrote letters in November and December 2002 to Northrop Grumman warning that flying single-engine planes was a recipe for disaster. The letters suggested that the Cessnas be replaced with twin-engine Beechcraft King Air 300s.

The planes were not replaced, and the two pilots resigned. After two crashes, which temporarily halted the program, Northrop Grumman resumed the operation under a different name, the Colombia Surveillance System, using twin-engine planes.

After the first crash, the program was transferred to a newly created company, CIAO Inc.

== Abduction ==
Marc Gonsalves, Thomas Howes, and Keith Stansell were on a drug surveillance mission in Colombia's cocaine-producing southern jungle when their single-engine Cessna plane crashed on February 13, 2003, in territory controlled by FARC.

The American pilot, Tom Janis, and a Colombian army intelligence officer, Sgt. Luis Alcides Cruz, were led out by FARC gunmen and shot. The three surviving Americans (Gonsalves, Stansell and Howes) were forced to march with the guerrillas, deeper and deeper into the jungle. After this, the three Americans' exact location was lost by US intelligence. Three other Americans associated with Northrop Grumman made an attempt to find the hostages by air, but were all killed when their plane hit a tree.

Then Colombian journalist Jorge Botero was allowed to contact the hostages and record a tape to prove that they were alive and well – and ready to be traded for imprisoned members of the FARC being held by the Colombian government.

== Publications ==
- Out of Captivity is a book authored by Marc Gonsalves, Keith Stansell, and Thomas Howes with the assistance of author Gary Brozek about their time spent as hostages of FARC guerrillas.

== See also ==
- List of kidnappings
- List of political hostages held by FARC
- List of solved missing person cases (2000s)
