= 1999–2002 FARC–Government peace process =

1999 - 2002 Peace process
- Part of Colombian armed conflict
Date	1999–2002
Location	San Vicente del Caguán, Colombia
Result	no peace agreement achieved. Government blamed the FARC of not complying by the accords the FARC expanded its military power and political influence.
Territorial changes	El Caguán DMZ

Belligerents
Government of Colombia; National Army; Air Force; Navy; National Police	FARC Secretariat; Eastern Bloc; Southern Bloc; Central Bloc; Western Bloc; Caribbean Bloc; Northwestern Bloc; Middle Magdalena Bloc

The FARC-Government peace process (1999–2002) (Spanish: Proceso de Paz entre las FARC y el gobierno Pastrana), from January 7, 1999, to February 20, 2002, was a failed peace process between the Government of President Andrés Pastrana Arango and the Revolutionary Armed Forces of Colombia (FARC) guerrilla group in an effort to bring to an end the ongoing Colombian armed conflict.

== Prelude ==
The FARC began their rebel activities in the early 1960s during the National Front years in which bipartisan hegemony controlled and held political power. In an effort to exterminate the armed guerrilla movements the Colombian government aided by the United States launched an attack to destroy the "Marquetalia Republic" a guerrilla enclave in central Colombia. After this attack the FARC guerrilla retreated to isolated or poor government presence areas and began establishing a parallel state governed by them. The guerrillas began extorting and kidnapping landowners and assaulting local agrarian banks (Caja Agrarias).

During the 1980s and 1990s the Colombian drug cartels had increased their power and in some cases had hired the guerrillas such as the FARC and ELN guerrillas to protect illicit cultivations from the government forces. The most powerful of the cartels; the Medellín and Cali Cartels had engulfed in a war with the government. The Medellín Cartel led by Pablo Escobar also became an enemy later of the FARC in a struggle to control the profitable illegal drug trafficking business. Escobar helped create right wing paramilitary groups. The FARC guerrilla used the revenues from taxing drug lords, and cultivation and production of these to finance their rebel activities.

On August 18, 1989, the Medellín Cartel assassinated the liberal presidential candidate Luis Carlos Galán. César Gaviria replaced him and was then elected president of Colombia. Gaviria avenged the death of Galan by dismantling the Medellín Cartel, but the gap left by this organization was quickly filled by the Cali Cartel and the FARC, which began expanding its influence and armed power in the countryside mainly.

During the government of Ernesto Samper the opposing candidate Andrés Pastrana accused President Samper of financing its campaign with money from the Cali Cartel. The political scandal known as the "8000 Process" surged and weakened the presidency and government institutions. The United States also conditioned its support for the government, focusing mainly on aiding the military forces on operations against narcotics, that would ultimately help bring down the Cali Cartel.

Without any major adversaries in the drug business other than the growing AUC paramilitary group, the FARC gained control of most of the drug production and trade, as well as financing its political rhetoric and influence over most of the regions in Colombia. With the weakening of the drug cartels the guerrillas became the main issue affecting Colombia. Andrés Pastrana ran for the presidential office again and as a candidate his campaign sustained negotiations with the FARC for a possible peace process.

== Peace Process ==
Pastrana then appointed Victor G. Ricardo as High Commissioner for Peace and held conversations with Manuel Marulanda Velez (aka Tirofijo) top commander of the FARC on June 15, 1998. On July 9 elected president Pastrana travelled to the mountains of Colombia and personally met with rebel commanders including "Tirofijo" himself.

On October 8 both sides agreed to create a demilitarized zone in the region of El Caguan, a jungle region in south central Colombia made up by the municipalities of Vista Hermosa, La Macarena, La Uribe and Mesetas in Meta Department, and San Vicente del Caguán in Caquetá Department.

On August 7, 1998 Pastrana becomes president of Colombia for the period 1998–2002.

On December 14, 1998, the Pastrana administration and the FARC agreed to begin formal peace talks on January 7, 1999.

=== Demands and proposals ===
The FARC demanded and proposed certain issues in order to begin; the following were proposed to quell the armed conflict: vision of the conflict, negotiation criteria, preparation of the negotiation, political legitimacy, security, participation, negotiated political settlement, civilian population, recommendations to the civilian population and rules of behavior regarding the masses. The group also considered fundamental topics: democracy, functioning of the state, the public force, social and economic aspects, agrarian reform, natural resources, sovereignty, drug trafficking, paramilitarism and CONVIVIR security groups.

On the other hand, the government tried to persuade the FARC to leave the Colombian Army Cazadores Battalion, stationed in the area of El Caguan, but FARC opposed. Victor G Ricardo agreed to withdraw the Battalion without consulting military officials. The government urged the FARC to support projects to manually eradicate illegal crops.

=== Formal dialogues begin ===
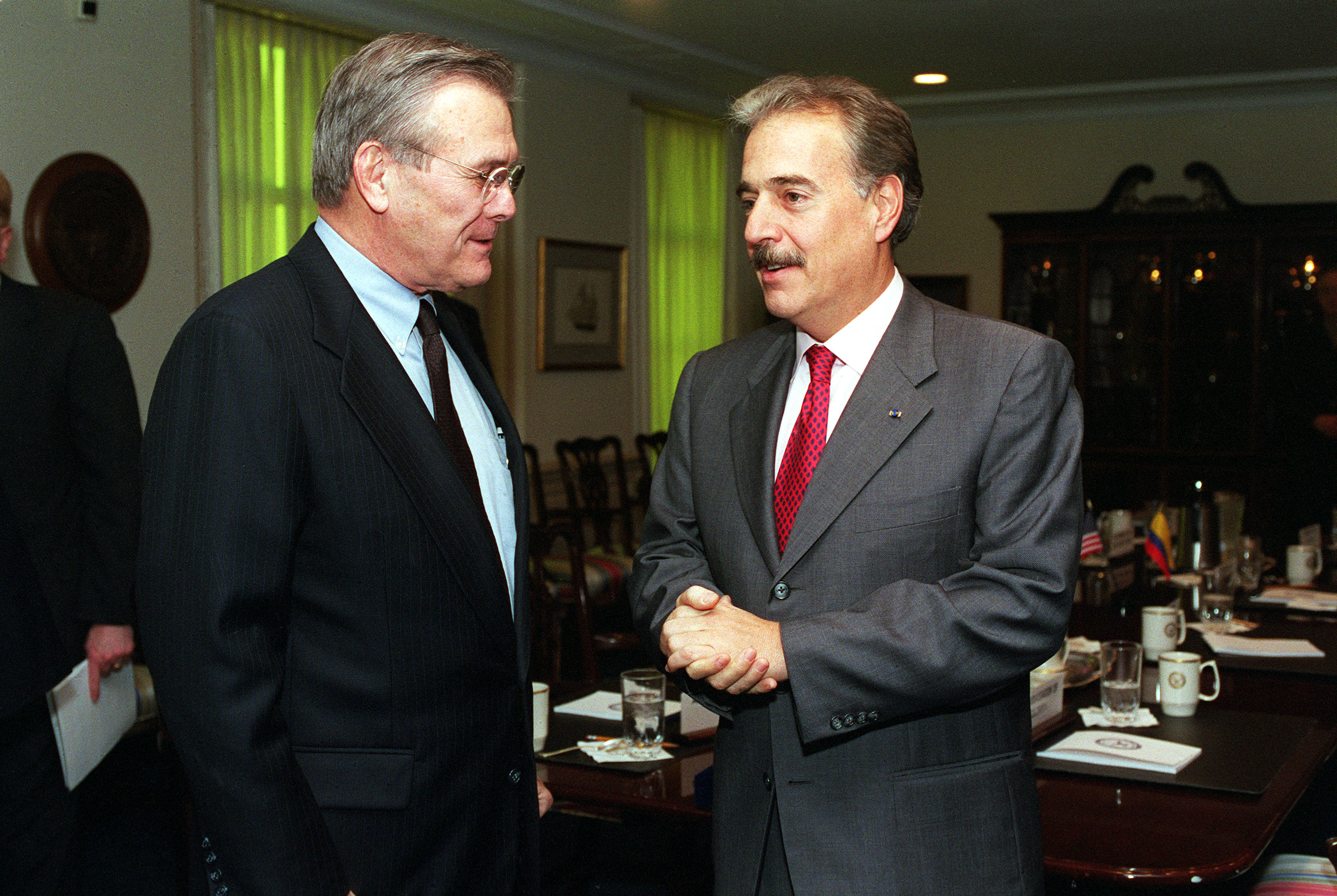
The then US Secretary of Defense Donald Rumsfeld meeting with President Andrés Pastrana.

As planned the formal dialogues began on January 7, 1999, in a ceremony at El Caguan with the presence of President Pastrana, but without the presence of "Tirofijo". The FARC argued that there was a possible threat to assassinate their commander "Tirofijo". FARC negotiator Joaquín Gómez acted on behalf of Tirofijo. President Pastrana said that "the absence of Manuel Marulanda Velez cannot be a reason to not continue with the instalment of the dialogue to agree on an agenda that will conduct us to peace". On January 8, "Tirofijo" showed up and insisted that there had been a possible assassination attempt.

==== Frozen dialogues ====
On January 11, guerrilla commander Jorge Briceño threatened to kidnap high-profile people if the government did not comply with FARC's demands for a prisoner exchange. Some years before, the FARC had kidnapped a considerable number of military personnel, high-profile politicians and government officials. Pastrana replied with a threat to end the peace process if the FARC carried out the kidnappings. On January 19 the FARC froze the dialogues that the AUC paramilitary groups were resurging and demanded the government to act against these groups and its supporters within the government.

On February 6 President Pastrana extends the duration of the demilitarized zone and sets it to expire on May 7. Three days later, Pastrana and "Tirofijo" finally met publicly and set a new meeting on February 14 to resume dialogues. The FARC had purportedly frozen the peace talks because of the government's spraying of glyphosate to eradicate illegal crops as stated in the Plan Colombia.

Between February 25 and March 11, three American indigenous-rights activists, Terence Freitas, Lahe'ena'e Gay, and Ingrid Washinawatok were abducted by the FARC in Arauca Department and later assassinated. The FARC admitted the assassination and apologized. The Colombian government then accused a high ranking FARC member known as Germán Briceño (brother of Jorge Briceño) of the assassination and the United States demanded the FARC to hand over the perpetrators. The FARC refused.

From April 20 to May 1, both parties met unofficially in El Caguan to discuss the paramilitary issue and the FARC's demands to expand the area of the demilitarized zone, which was due to expire on May 7, and to extend the timeframe.

On May 2, President Pastrana travelled to the demilitarized zone and personally met with "Tirofijo" for a second time. Pastrana convinced him to begin formal peace-talks on May 6. It was agreed that the demilitarized area would remain in size, but its expiration would be postponed. Another decision was to form an International Verification Commission to observe the agreements and the FARC's actions in the area.

On May 26, Colombian Minister of Defense, Rodrigo Lloreda resigned after criticising the president's handling of the peace process. Lloreda opposed the indefinite extension of the timeline of the demilitarized area. The High Commissioner for Peace's remarks suggesting an extension of the demilitarized area for the FARC triggered a discontent in some servicemen in the Colombian military; 18 generals also tried to resign but the president only accepted Lloreda's. The head of the armed forces, Gen. Fernando Tapias, offered President Pastrana a public show of support. Pastrana then appointed Luis Fernando Ramírez as Defense Minister.

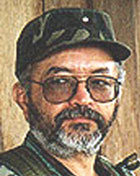
'Raúl Reyes; Farc negotiator.

The Center for International Policy led a delegation of US Congressmen to Colombia. Among the representatives was William Delahunt (D-MA) and six other members of Congress, who met with government officials and representatives of political parties, church groups, peace groups, human rights groups, US government employees stationed in Colombia and the United Nations. On June 4 the delegation of US representatives travelled to El Caguan to meet with rebel leaders. They held talks without results with guerrilla commander Raúl Reyes regarding the drug trade, kidnappings and the assassination of US citizens, specially related to the three US indigenous workers.

The government then announced that the formal negotiations with the FARC would begin on July 7. But a day before, both parties postponed the peace talks until July 19 alleging that three of FARC's negotiators could not arrive on time to the meeting, the FARC argued that they also needed more time to organize their positions regarding the International Commission, as agreed between "Tirofijo" and President Pastrana.

Between 8–12 July the FARC launched an armed offensive (called by them as "armed strikes" from the Spanish: paro armado), in which the guerrilla group attacked 15 small towns and targeted infrastructure; mainly commercial banks, bridges and energy infrastructure, random kidnappings (Colloquially called in Colombian Spanish: pescas milagrosas) as well as assaulting numerous National Police small posts. The Military of Colombia, with the help of the U.S. government, counterattacked by bombing guerrilla enclaves using U.S. provided satellite intelligence.

On July 15, 1999 Defense Minister Luis Fernando Ramírez and the Colombian General of the Chief of Staff Fernando Tapias requested US$500 million as aid to fund counter-narcotics and counter-insurgency warfare. The then head of the US Office of National Drug Control Policy Barry McCaffrey called for a billion dollar as supplemental assistance for the war on drugs in South America, half of it to be assigned to Colombia.
