= El Caguán DMZ =

Demilitarized zone in southern Colombia

El Caguán DMZ (Spanish: Zona de Distensión, zona de despeje de San Vicente del Caguán) was a demilitarized zone of 42,000 km² in southern Colombia authorized by the government of President Andrés Pastrana to negotiate a peace process with the Revolutionary Armed Forces of Colombia (Fuerzas Armadas Revolucionarias de Colombia - Ejercito Popular, or FARC-EP). It existed for three years, from 1999 until 2002.

On October 8, 1998, then presidential candidate Andrés Pastrana agreed with FARC commanders to create a demilitarized zone in the region of El Caguán river basin, a jungle region in south central Colombia made up by the municipalities of Vista Hermosa, La Macarena, La Uribe and Mesetas in Meta Department, and San Vicente del Caguán in Caquetá Department to negotiate a possible peace process.

== Formation of the demilitarized zone ==
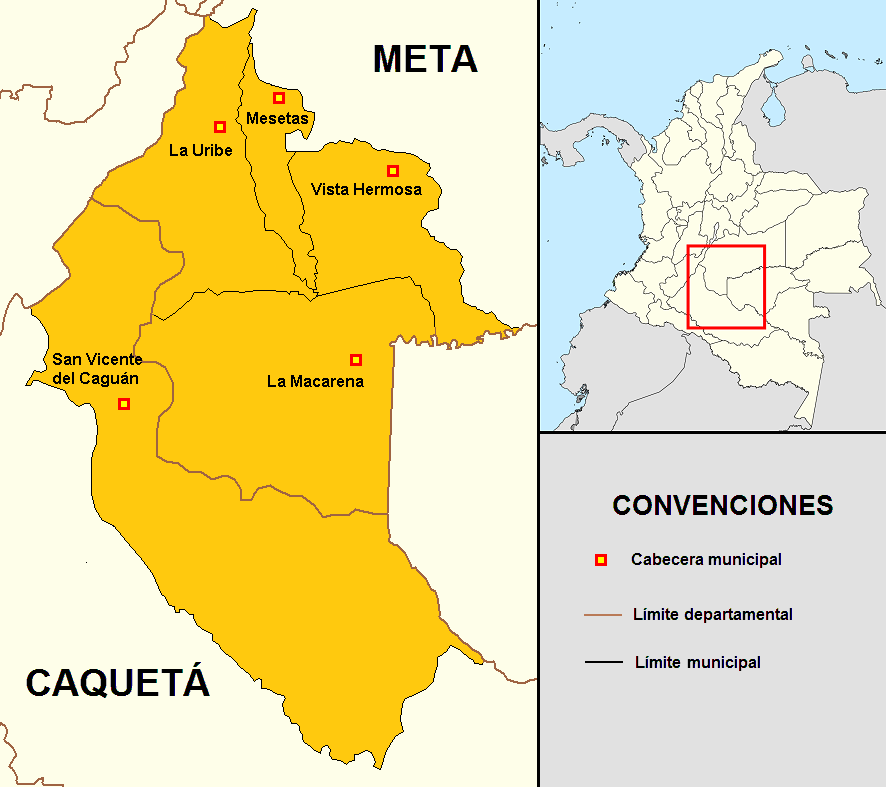
Map of El Caguán DMZ

Andrés Pastrana, after taking office as head of state on 7 August 1998, and thanks to law 418 of 1997, which empowered the president of the Republic of Colombia to reach agreements with organized groups operating outside the law, decided to formalize the creation and military clearance of the Caguán demilitarized zone through Resolution No. 85 of 14 October 1998.

It was determined that the zone would be composed of 5 municipalities. In the document issued by the president of the Republic of Colombia, it was stipulated that the demilitarized zone would initially be in effect for 3 months, starting on 7 November 1998 and ending on 7 February 1999. However, after some time, the duration of the demilitarized zone was extended through different decrees. On 20 February 2002, Pastrana, through Resolution No. 32, decided to terminate the demilitarized zone.

== FARC-EP administration ==
The verification procedure for compliance with minimum standards of conduct by FARC-EP, which was understood to be clearly outlined from the beginning and which distributed responsibility between the parties to guarantee the development of the Demilitarized Zone, became an element of permanent discord until it blocked all possibility of progress in the negotiations. Later, in the face of recurring complaints, concern increased, as the municipalities located in the surroundings of the Demilitarized Zone experienced an ostensible deterioration of public order, which was seen as the exploitation of the zone as a platform for launching armed actions.

As complaints increased, the situation became increasingly difficult for the Government, while FARC-EP insisted on claiming the Demilitarized Zone as recognition of their territorial, military, political, and historical dominance. This supposed recognition implied for FARC-EP not only the withdrawal of the Public Forces during a determined period, as the Government established at the time, but their non-return insofar as possible, or their return under the most precarious conditions possible. The Government's absence was expressed in the absence of its institutions that exercise State functions such as Public Forces, Prosecutor's Office, Attorney General's Office, judges of any kind, prisons, notary offices, etc.

== Location ==
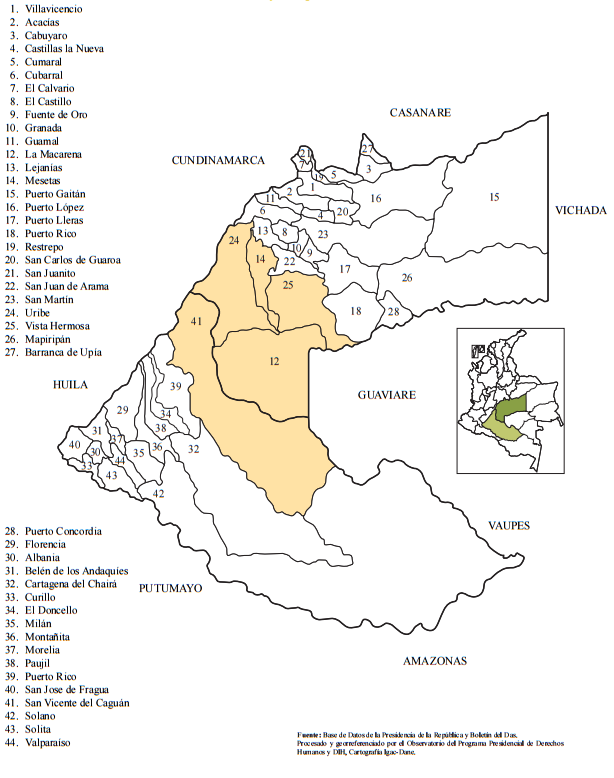
Municipalities of El Caguán DMZ.

The Demilitarized Zone comprised approximately 42,000 square kilometers and was made up of the municipalities of La Uribe, Mesetas, La Macarena and Vista Hermosa in the department of Meta and San Vicente del Caguán in the department of Caquetá.

Bordering to the northwest and west with the department of Huila and in turn with the municipalities of Algeciras, Baraya, Colombia, Neiva, Rivera and Tello; to the north with Bogotá, specifically with the locality of Sumapaz; to the northeast with the department of Meta, with the municipalities of San Juan de Arama, Puerto Lleras, Puerto Rico, Lejanías and Cubarral; to the east with the department of Guaviare, with the municipalities of Calamar and San José del Guaviare; and to the west, southwest, south, and southeast with the department of Caquetá, with the municipalities of Solano, Cartagena del Chairá, and Puerto Rico.
