= Tomás Medina Caracas =

Colombian guerrilla member (1965–2007)

- Born: 15 March 1965
- Died: 1 September 2007 (aged 42)
- Other names: Negro Acacio
- Occupation: guerrilla fighter
- Known for: Revolutionary Armed Forces of Colombia

Tomás Medina Caracas, also known as Tomás Molina Caracas and Negro Acacio (15 March 1965 – 1 September 2007), was a Colombian guerrilla member and high-ranking leader of the Revolutionary Armed Forces of Colombia (FARC). He was considered by Colombian authorities to be the mastermind behind the illegal drug trade business and the head of the Eastern Bloc's 16th Front of this rebel group.

He gained notoriety during the FARC-Government peace process (1999-2002) as a key negotiator. He was also notorious for his association with Brazilian drug dealer Fernandinho Beiramar and his involvement in a clandestine arms deal of 10,000 AK-47s for the FARC through the Peruvian government official Vladimiro Montesinos, an adviser of former president of Peru, Alberto Fujimori. Medina Caracas was killed on 1 September 2007, in a Colombian Army military operation in eastern Colombia, within the municipality of Cumaribo near the border with Venezuela.

Medina Caracas had between 17 and 23 legal processes pending with the Attorney General of Colombia, requesting his capture and a red corner notice issued by the INTERPOL. The Colombian Army spent two years searching for Medina Caracas, with him escaping from most of the operations carried out to find him. Just in Colombia, Medina Caracas was charged with narcotrafficking, delinquency, kidnapping, torture, first degree murder, terrorism, extortion and robbery.

== Early years ==
Medina Caracas was of Afro-Colombian origin. He became a teacher in a public school in the town of Santander de Quilichao, northern Cauca Department near the vereda known as Mary López where he was born. He later joined the FARC in May 1987 when he was 22 years old under the supervision of guerrilla leader Iván Márquez, a high-ranking member within the FARC chain of command. Apparently his nickname "Negro Acacio" was given by "Mono Jojoy" after one of the "heroes" of the Cuban Revolution.
