= Vista Hermosa, Meta =

Coordinates: 3°7′26″N 73°45′5″W

- Municipality and town
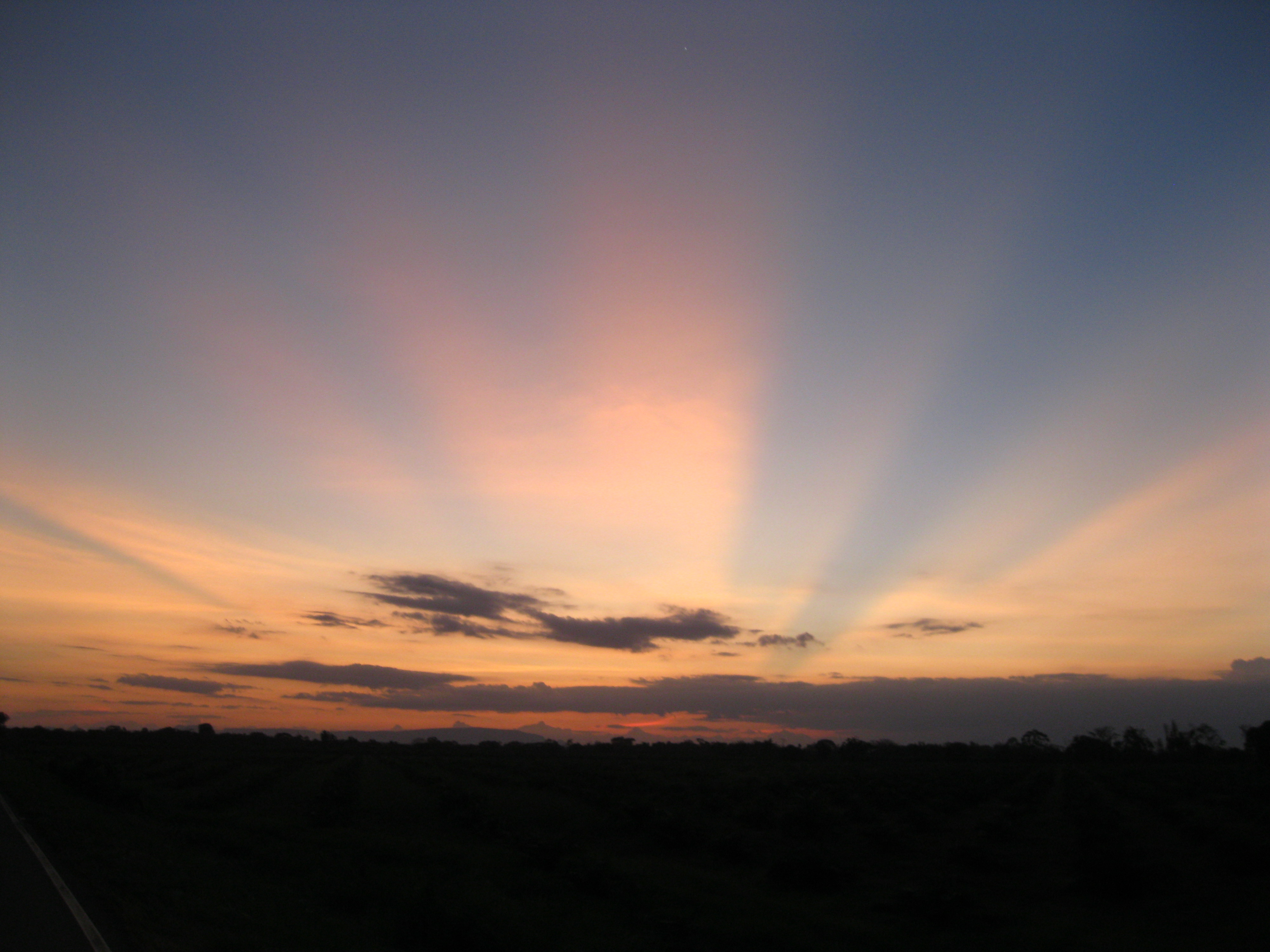

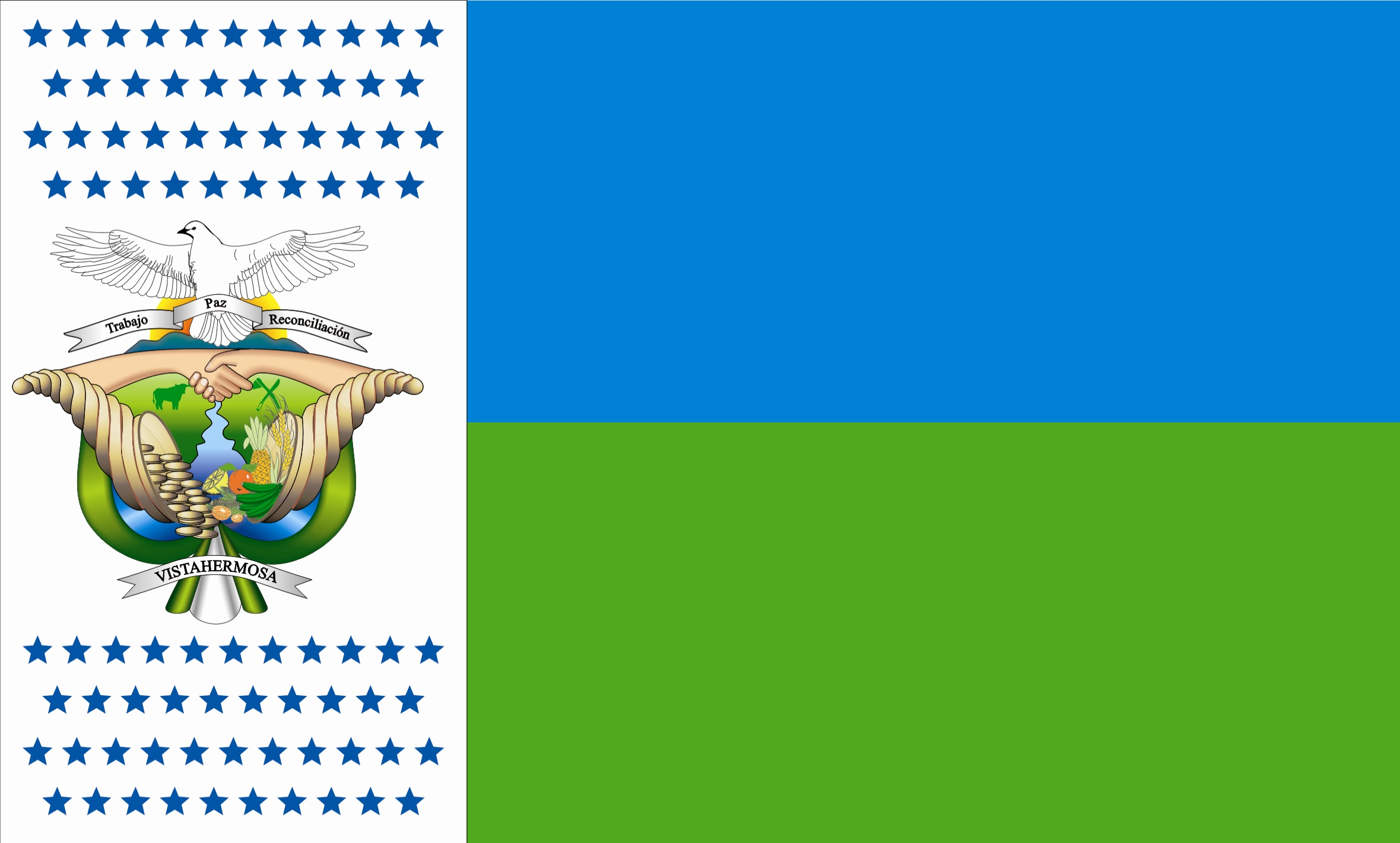
- Flag Coat of arms

- Location of the municipality and town of Vista Hermosa, Meta in the Meta Department of Colombia.
- Country: Colombia
- Department: Meta Department

Area
  - Total: 4,849 km^{2} (1,872 sq mi)
- Elevation: 460 m (1,510 ft)

Population (Census 2018)
  - Total: 16,525
  - Density: 3.408/km^{2} (8.826/sq mi)
- Time zone: UTC-5 (Colombia Standard Time)
- Climate: Am

Vista Hermosa is a town and municipality in the Meta Department, Colombia. That is located approximately 6 hours from Bogotá D.C. It has fully paved access roads that allow a quick movement to the urban area and the visualization of its beautiful landscapes that live up to its name.

This municipality is made up of 84 villages and its population is approximately 25,000 inhabitants. It has limits with the municipalities of San Juan de Arama, La Macarena, Puerto Lleras, Mesetas, Uribe Meta

== Sightseeing ==
Vista Hermosa is one of the municipalities that develop ecotourism since it has a great wealth of natural resources, with a variety of landscapes, including hot springs, beaches, jets, pipes among others. Among them, the best known are the beaches of the Guejar river, the asphalt mine in Maracaibo, the Sardinata jets in the Maracaibo village, the Unión jets in the Caño Unión village, the archaeological park in the Cunimia village, and the attractions of the Park National Natural Serranía de La Macarena.

== Caño Unión ==
Thanks to its water, Vistahermosa attracts many tourists each year to enjoy its beautiful landscapes, proof of this is Caño union. This is one of the largest waterfalls in the department of Meta and the large size and rock formation as well as its clear water jets make it one of the most visited places. Given the conditions of its geographical location, it has a large vegetation useful for family activities such as walks, hiking and camping.

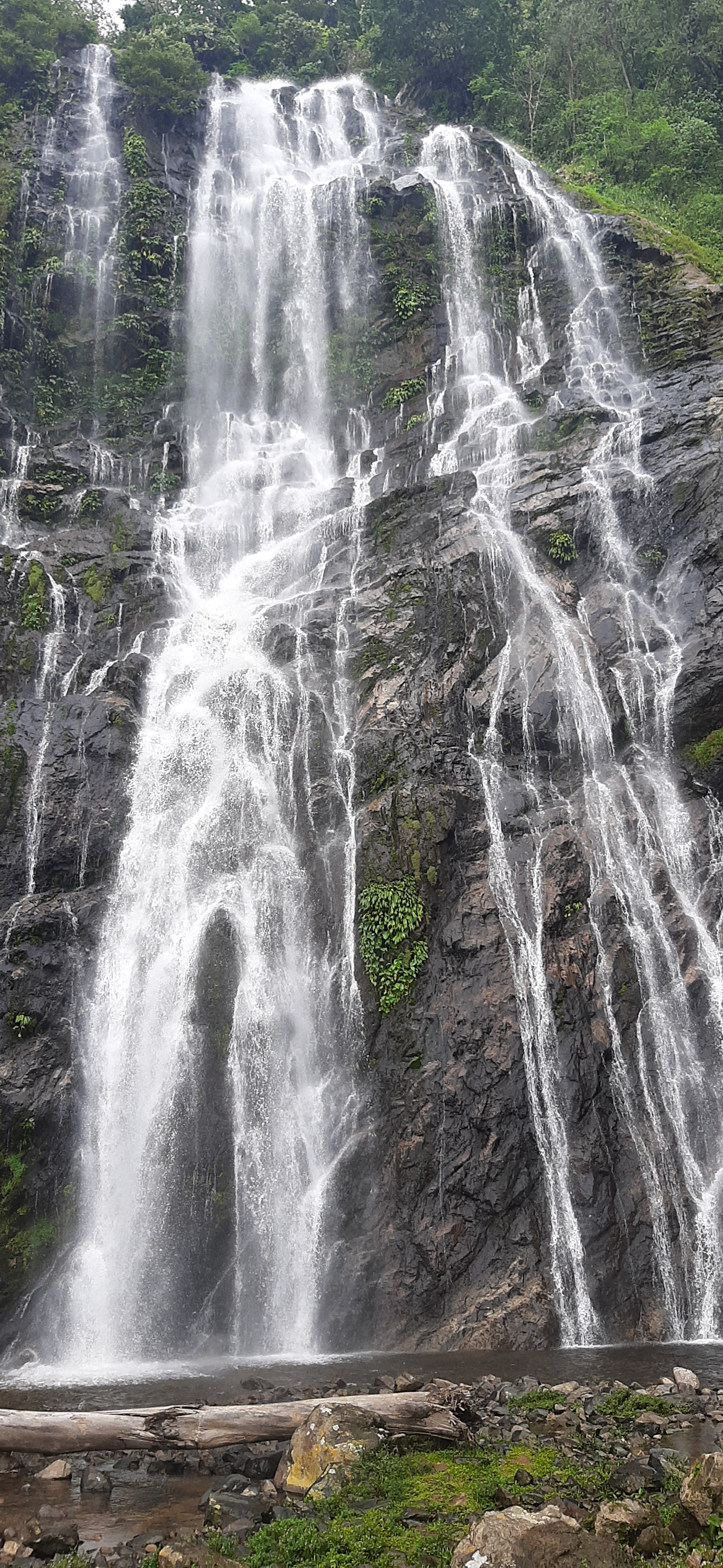
Caño union, one of the largest waterfalls in the department of Meta

== Waterfall Sardinata ==
In Vista Hermosa Meta, its found The Sardinata jets are located in the Maracaibo path, it has a fall from natural water, is the highest waterfall in Colombia, approximately 740 meters high.

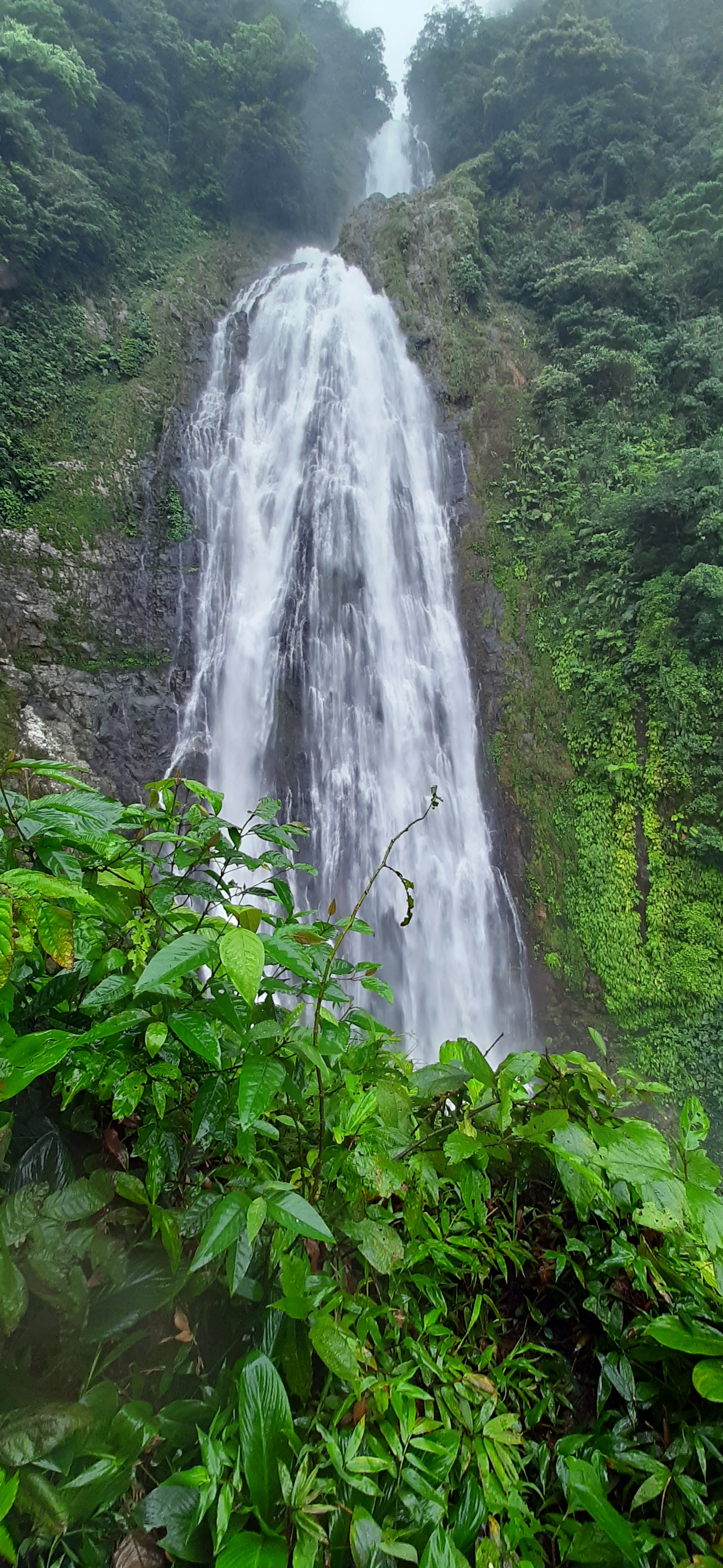
Sardinata waterfalls located in vista Hermosa Meta Colombia

== River Güejar ==
This is one of the main tributaries of the region providing multiple benefits to the entire community that surrounds it, such as fishing, transportation to areas of difficult access and thanks to its striking crystalline waters it stands out for being one of the largest sources of tourism. It is surprising for its multiple natural pools, waterfalls and rock formations that are part of the Guyanese Shield.

One of the main tourist activities is rafting and canoeing through the Güejar canyon. This place had been hidden because of the armed conflict that took place in previous years and that today can be visited without any restrictions.

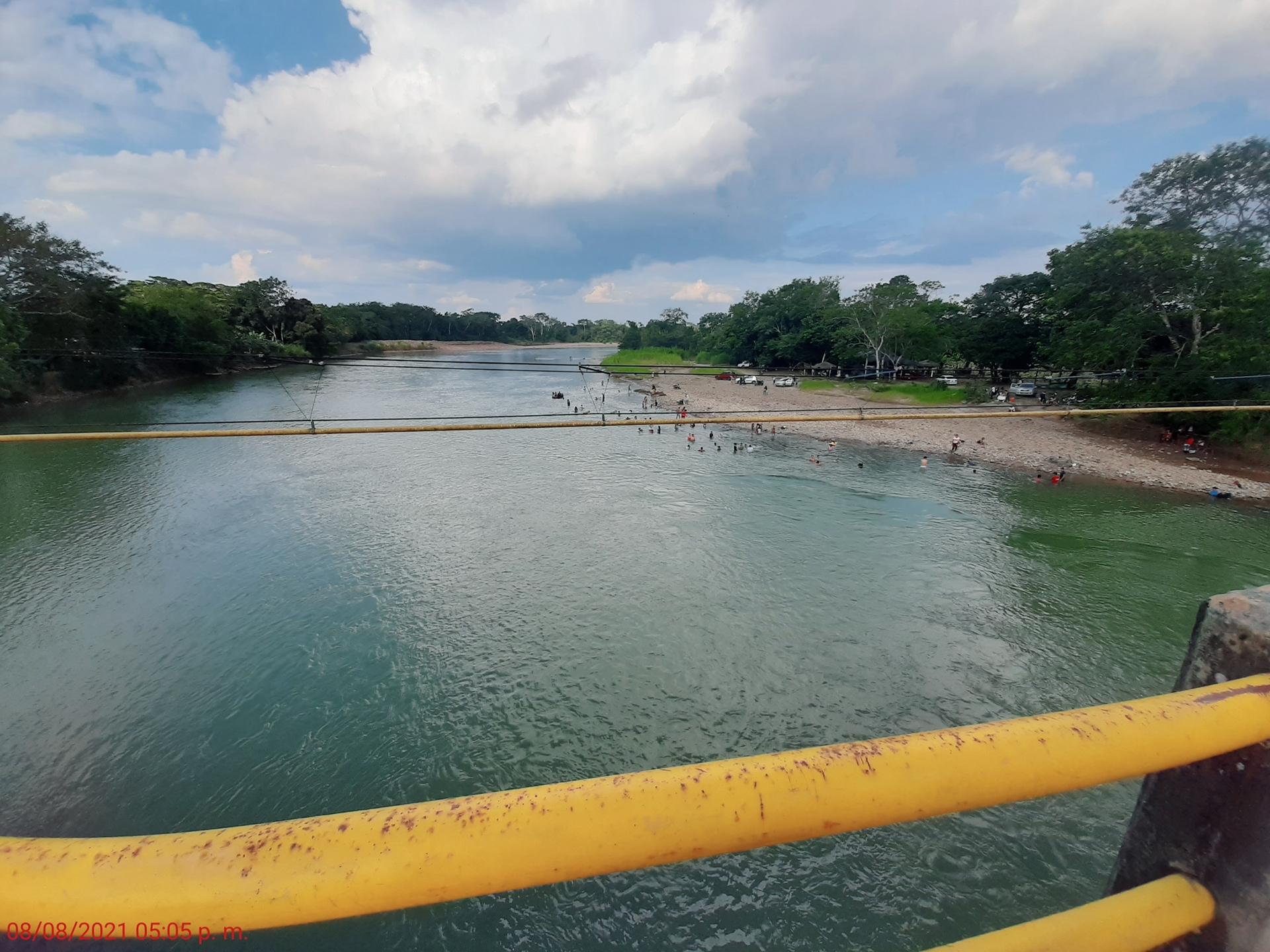
River Güejar a paradise to discover

== Climate ==
Climate data for Vista Hermosa, elevation 325 m (1,066 ft), (1981–2010)
Month	Jan	Feb	Mar	Apr	May	Jun	Jul	Aug	Sep	Oct	Nov	Dec	Year
Mean daily maximum °C (°F)	33.1 (91.6)	33.2 (91.8)	32.1 (89.8)	30.5 (86.9)	29.9 (85.8)	29.1 (84.4)	29.3 (84.7)	30.2 (86.4)	31.0 (87.8)	31.1 (88.0)	31.1 (88.0)	31.6 (88.9)	30.9 (87.6)
Daily mean °C (°F)	27.4 (81.3)	27.4 (81.3)	26.7 (80.1)	25.8 (78.4)	25.5 (77.9)	24.7 (76.5)	24.7 (76.5)	25.2 (77.4)	25.6 (78.1)	25.8 (78.4)	26.2 (79.2)	26.7 (80.1)	26.0 (78.8)
Mean daily minimum °C (°F)	23.0 (73.4)	22.9 (73.2)	22.5 (72.5)	22.1 (71.8)	22.0 (71.6)	21.3 (70.3)	21.1 (70.0)	21.2 (70.2)	21.5 (70.7)	21.8 (71.2)	22.4 (72.3)	22.9 (73.2)	22.0 (71.6)
Average precipitation mm (inches)	30.0 (1.18)	94.3 (3.71)	203.3 (8.00)	358.9 (14.13)	394.6 (15.54)	361.0 (14.21)	294.3 (11.59)	204.5 (8.05)	208.0 (8.19)	268.0 (10.55)	206.1 (8.11)	91.8 (3.61)	2,650.2 (104.34)
Average precipitation days	5	8	14	21	22	22	21	19	17	18	15	9	180
Average relative humidity (%)	69	68	75	82	84	85	84	83	81	81	79	76	79
Mean monthly sunshine hours	198.4	152.4	114.7	105.0	117.8	102.0	117.8	133.3	138.0	151.9	159.0	192.2	1,682.5
Mean daily sunshine hours	6.4	5.4	3.7	3.5	3.8	3.4	3.8	4.3	4.6	4.9	5.3	6.2	4.6
Source: Instituto de Hidrologia Meteorologia y Estudios Ambientales

=== References ===
- "Caño Unión: asómbrate con este laberinto natural en el Meta" .(in Spanish).Retrieved 21 November 2021.
- "Vista Hermosa" .Colombia Turismo web.(in Spanish).Retrieved 21 November 2021.
- "Turismo vista Hermosa".2011.(inspanish)..Retrieved 21 November 2021
