= International zone =

Type of extraterritorial zone

An international zone is any area not fully subject to the border control policies of the state in which it is located. There are several types of international zones ranging from special economic zones and sterile zones at ports of entry exempt from customs rules to concessions over which administration is ceded to one or more foreign states. International zones may also maintain distinct visa policies from the rest of the surrounding state.

== Special economic zones ==
A special economic zone (SEZ) is an area in which the business and trade laws are different from the rest of the jurisdiction within which it is located. SEZs are generally established to increase foreign direct investment or facilitate export-oriented manufacturing. Depending on its purpose, an SEZ typically has less strict border control policies with regard to customs. An export processing zone will typically allow for goods manufactured for export to be exempt from excise tax and for capital goods and raw materials to be exempt from customs duties upon import, while a bonded logistics park will typically exempt a designated area from all or most customs regulations. The most extreme category of SEZ is a freeport (e.g. Luxembourg Freeport, Singapore Freeport, Geneva Freeport), in which goods stored or transhipped are treated as never having entered the host jurisdiction.

Uniquely, Svalbard is an entirely visa-free zone under the terms of the Svalbard Treaty, which recognises the sovereignty of Norway over the Arctic archipelago of Svalbard but subjects it to certain stipulations and consequently not all Norwegian law applies, including border controls. The treaty regulates the demilitarisation of the archipelago. The signatories were given equal rights to engage in commercial activities (mainly coal mining) on the islands. As of 2012, Norway and Russia are making use of this right. Similarly, simplified visa policies are in force for Iran's special economic zones of Kish and Qeshm islands, and for Iraqi Kurdistan.

== Concessions ==
A concession is a territory within a state over which another state has been granted jurisdiction. During the Age of Imperialism, concessions were frequently granted to colonial or imperial powers. Notably, the United Nations' headquarters in New York City and offices in Geneva, Vienna, and Nairobi are administered as international concessions by the United Nations, while still subject to most local and national laws. As the United Nations requires delegates from all member states to be permitted to attend meetings at its headquarters, host countries maintain special visa arrangements such as the C-2 visa which enables otherwise inadmissible foreign officials to enter the United States, provided they remain within the vicinity of the UN headquarters.

The Tangier International Zone was a 373 square kilometre concession administered by several countries in the Moroccan city of Tangier and its environs between 1923 and 1956. Much like the Shanghai International Settlement, the government and administration of the zone was in the hands of a number of foreign powers. The Zone had its own appointed International Legislative Assembly, which was subject to supervision by a Committee of Control consisting of the Consuls of Belgium, France, Britain, Italy, the Netherlands, Portugal, and Spain. Executive power was vested in an Administrator, and judicial power resided in a Mixed Court of five judges, respectively appointed by the Belgian, British, Spanish, French, and Italian governments. As a result of the creation of the Mixed Court, the various European powers withdrew the consular courts that previously exercised jurisdiction there. The Zone had a reputation for tolerance, diversity of culture, religion, and bohemianism. It became a tourist hotspot for literary giants and gay men from Western countries. Many of the latter were able to live an openly "out" life in the Zone. In July 1952 the protecting powers met at Rabat to discuss the Zone's future, agreeing to abolish it. Tangier joined with the rest of Morocco following the restoration of full sovereignty in 1956.

The Tomb of Suleyman Shah, grandfather of the founder of the Ottoman Empire Osman I, has been located in northern Syria since the Empire's collapse. The 1921 Treaty of Ankara (Note: The treaty, ratified by France, which ruled Syria at the time, states that the tomb "shall remain, with its appurtenances, the property of Turkey, who may appoint guardians for it and may hoist the Turkish flag there".) established the area surrounding the tomb as a Turkish concession. The tomb was moved in 1973 as the site was to be flooded by the creation of Euphrates Lake, and in 2015 it was relocated unilaterally by Turkey in response to the Syrian civil war. The Syrian government denounced the move as incompatible with the 1921 treaty; Turkey plans to move the tomb back to the second site.

=== Asia ===
The island port of Dejima was a Portuguese, and later Dutch, concession near the Japanese city of Nagasaki. Established to house Portuguese traders during the Nanban trade, it was later ceded to Dutch administration between 1641 and 1854. Under the Sakoku policy in force during the Edo period, it was Japan's only point of interaction with the outside world. Border controls limited passage of foreign merchants from Dejima to Nagasaki and of Japanese from Nagasaki to Dejima. Similarly, the island of Macau was ceded by China during the Ming dynasty to the Portuguese, who administered it as a trading hub between 1557 and 1999. In the aftermath of the Opium Wars, the Ming Dynasty's successor Qing Dynasty ceded the island of Hong Kong and the surrounding area to the British under the Treaty of Nanjing, resulting in the area being administered as a British trading hub until 1997.

During the late Qing years, significant portions of Chinese territory, primarily along the coast, were surrendered as concessions to occupying powers including many European powers as well as Japan and the United States. Each concession had its own police force, and different legal jurisdictions with their own separate laws. Thus, an activity might be legal in one concession but illegal in another. Many of the concessions also maintained their own military garrison and standing army. Military and police forces of the Chinese government were sometimes present. Some police forces allowed Chinese, others did not. In these concessions, the citizens of each foreign power were given the right to freely inhabit, trade, proselytize, and travel. They developed their own sub-cultures, isolated and distinct from the intrinsic Chinese culture, and colonial administrations attempted to give their concessions "homeland" qualities. Churches, public houses, and various other western commercial institutions sprang up in the concessions. In the case of Japan, its own traditions and language naturally flourished. Some of these concessions eventually had more advanced architecture of each originating culture than most cities back in the countries of the foreign powers origin. Chinese were originally forbidden from most of the concessions, but to improve commercial activity and services, by the 1860s most concessions permitted Chinese, but treated them like second-class citizens as they were not citizens of the foreign state administering the concession. They eventually became the majority of the residents inside the concessions. Non-Chinese in the concessions were generally subject to consular law, and some of these laws applied to the Chinese residents. Notable Concessions include the Shanghai International Settlement administered by the United Kingdom and the United States, the French Concession in Shanghai, the Kwantung Leased Territory, and the Beijing Legation Quarter.

The foreign concessions in China continued to exist during the mainland period of the Republic of China. In major cities like Shanghai and Tianjin, due to the existence of numerous jurisdictions, criminals could commit a crime in one jurisdiction and then easily escape to another. This became a major problem during the Republican period, with the rise of post–Imperial Warlord era and the collapse of central authority in the 1920s and the 1930s. Crime often flourished, especially organised crime by different warlord groups.

The majority of concessions in Asia were treaty ports, port cities in China and Japan that were opened to foreign trade mainly by the unequal treaties forced upon them by Western powers, as well as cities in Korea opened up similarly by the Japanese Empire prior to its annexation of the Korean peninsula. The treaty port system in China lasted approximately one hundred years beginning with the 1841 Opium War. The system effectively ended when Japan took control of most of the ports in the late 1930s, The Russians relinquished their treaty rights in the wake of the Russian revolution in 1917, and the Germans were expelled in 1914. The three main treaty powers, the British, the Americans, and the French continued to hold their concessions and extraterritorial jurisdictions until the Second World War. This ended when the Japanese stormed into their concessions in late 1941. They formally relinquished their treaty rights in a new "equal treaties" agreement with Chiang Kai-shek's Nationalist Government in exile in Chongqing in 1943. The international communities that were residues of the treaty port era ended in the late 1940s when the communists took over and nearly all foreigners left.

Within the concessions in China, the occupying foreign powers administered distinct legal systems. The two main courts judging extraterritorial cases were the Shanghai Mixed Court and the British Supreme Court for China. Similar courts were established for treaty countries, e.g. the United States Court for China. These had jurisdiction over the concession areas, which formally remained under Qing sovereignty. Initially, Chinese people who committed crimes in, say, the British zone, were remanded to Chinese authorities.

=== Suez and Panama canals ===
The Suez and Panama Canals were originally established as concessions administered by the foreign powers who funded their construction. Between 1859 and 1956, the British and French owned Suez Canal Company which operated the Suez Canal while the United States government administered the area surrounding the Panama Canal from 1903 to 1999. Concessionary administration of the Suez Canal was ended when Egyptian President Gamal Abdel Nasser nationalised the company during the Suez Crisis while American administration of the Panama Canal ended as a result of the Torrijos–Carter Treaties in which the United States voluntarily renounced its concession over the Panama Canal Zone.

=== Overseas military bases ===
Overseas military bases such as the American-administered Pituffik Space Base in Greenland and Guantanamo Bay in Cuba or the British-administered Akrotiri and Dhekelia on the island of Cyprus are a distinct category of concession ceded by a host state solely for military purposes. The jurisdictional authority ceded to the administering military force varies from base to base depending on the agreement concluded by the host and administering state. For example, Khmeimim Air Base in Syria is leased to the Russian government for a period of 49 years and the Russian government exercises extraterritorial jurisdiction over the air base and its personnel while the British government administers Akrotiri and Dhekelia (designated as "sovereign base areas" under the treaty establishing Cyprus independence) as an overseas territory.

== Sterile zones at ports of entry ==
The sterile zone at a port of entry is the area where arriving international passengers have not formally entered the country by clearing arrival customs and immigration controls, and departing passengers have formally exited the country by clearing exit immigration control. Sterile zones are most commonly found in international airports, while they also exist at certain seaports and land crossings. Despite their usual exemption from local immigration and customs laws, international zones at ports of entry are fully under the jurisdiction of the country where they are located and local laws apply. Persons caught committing an unlawful act (e.g. possession of contraband such as illegal drugs) in the international zone are liable for prosecution.

Within international airports, transit passengers can usually take connecting international flights in the international zone without clearing customs and immigration controls, and in most cases do not require a visa. Some countries, however, require transit passengers of certain nationalities to hold a direct airside transit visa even when they would not need to pass through border controls. To exempt passengers transiting between international flights from clearing border controls, most international airports outside North America feature a sterile zone which only authorized employees and processed passengers with a valid ticket are allowed to enter.

Two major exceptions are the United States and Canada, where airports typically have no international transit zones. All passengers arriving on international flights are subject to customs and immigration inspections. Nationals of countries other than the United States and Canada at a U.S. airport requires at least a C-1 transit visa, or ESTA for eligible travellers. Meanwhile, transiting at a Canadian airport for nationals of countries other than Canada or the United States generally requires a visa or Electronic Travel Authorization (eTA) except for individuals proceeding to or from the United States who qualify for the China Transit Program or Transit Without Visa Program.

A common feature of sterile zones at airports and occasionally land and sea borders, duty-free shops sell products tax-free to customers who have cleared exit border controls prior to boarding and, in some places, to passengers arriving from overseas. Most countries impose limits on how much of each type of duty-free goods, may be purchased by each passenger. The airport with the most duty-free sales is Seoul Incheon Airport with US$1.85 billion in 2016. Dubai International Airport is second, recording transactions worth $1.82 billion in 2016.

EuroAirport Basel Mulhouse Freiburg, an airport located in France 20 kilometres southeast of Mulhouse and 3.5 kilometres northwest of Basel (Switzerland), contains a binational sterile zone including a customs road allowing passengers travelling to and from Switzerland to access the airport without passing through French customs control. The airport has been jointly operated by the two countries since a 1946 treaty. Geneva Airport in Switzerland has similar facilities for French travellers.

== Demilitarised zones ==
A demilitarised zone is an area in which treaties or other agreements between nations, military powers or contending groups forbid military installations, activities or personnel. They often lie along de jure or de facto frontiers or boundaries between two or more military powers or alliances. Demilitarised zones should not be confused with border zones, which are areas lying along a border established unilaterally by a state for border control purposes.

Many demilitarised zones are considered neutral territory because neither side is allowed to control it, even for non-combat administration. Some zones remain demilitarised after an agreement has awarded control to a state which (under the DMZ terms) had originally ceded its right to maintain military forces in the disputed territory. It is also possible for powers to agree on the demilitarisation of a zone without formally settling their respective territorial claims, enabling the dispute to be resolved by peaceful means such as diplomatic dialogue or an international court.

Several demilitarised zones have also unintentionally become wildlife preserves because their land is unsafe for construction or less exposed to human disturbances (including hunting). Examples include the Korean Demilitarised Zone, the Cypriot Demilitarised Zone (The Green Line), and the former Vietnamese Demilitarised Zone which divided Vietnam into two countries (North Vietnam and South Vietnam) from 21 July 1954 to 2 July 1976.

=== Asia ===
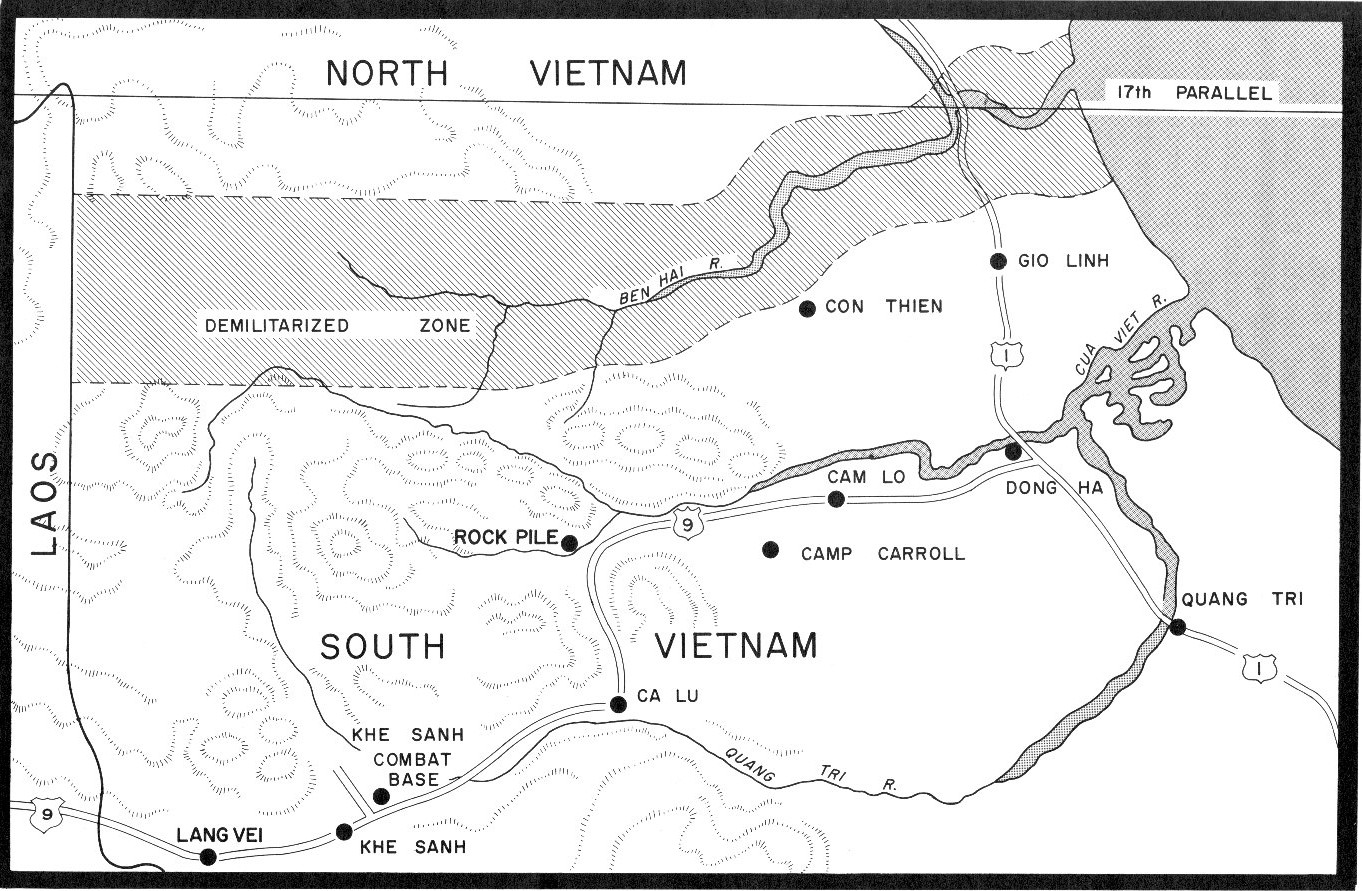
The Vietnamese Demilitarised Zone separating North and South Vietnam in 1969

As a result of the partition of the Korean peninsula by the United States and the Soviet Union after World War II, and exacerbated by the subsequent Korean War, there is a Demilitarised Zone (DMZ) spanning the de facto border between North Korea and South Korea. The DMZ follows the effective boundaries as of the end of the Korean War in 1953. Similarly to the Frontier Closed Area in Hong Kong, this zone and the defence apparatus that exists on both sides of the border serve to curtail unauthorised passage between the two sides. In South Korea, there is an additional fenced-off area between the Civilian Control Line (CCL) and the start of the Demilitarised Zone. The CCL is a line that designates an additional buffer zone to the Demilitarised Zone within a distance of 5 to 20 kilometres from the Southern Limit Line of the Demilitarised Zone. Its purpose is to limit and control the entrance of civilians into the area to protect and maintain the security of military facilities and operations near the Demilitarised Zone. The commander of the 8th US Army ordered the creation of the CCL and it was activated and first became effective in February 1954. The buffer zone that falls south of the Southern Limit Line is called the Civilian Control Zone. Barbed wire fences and manned military guard posts mark the CCLe. South Korean soldiers typically accompany tourist busses and cars travelling north of the CCL as armed guards to monitor the civilians as well as to protect them from North Korean intruders. Most of the tourist and media photos of the "Demilitarised Zone fence" are actually photos of the CCL fence. The actual Demilitarised Zone fence on the Southern Limit Line is completely off-limits to everybody except soldiers and it is illegal to take pictures of the Demilitarised Zone fence.

Similarly, the whole estuary of the Han River in the Korean Peninsula is deemed a "Neutral Zone" and is officially off-limits to all civilian vessels. Only military vessels are allowed within this neutral zone. (Note: According to the July 1953 Korean Armistice Agreement civil shipping was supposed to be permissible in the Han River estuary and allow Seoul to be connected to the Yellow Sea (West Sea) via the Han River. However, both Koreas and the UNC failed to make this happen. The South Korean government ordered the construction of the Ara Canal to finally connect Seoul to the Yellow Sea, which was completed in 2012. Seoul was effectively landlocked from the ocean until 2012. The biggest limitation of the Ara Canal is it is too narrow to handle any vessels except small tourist boats and recreational boats, so Seoul still cannot receive large commercial ships or passenger ships in its port.) In recent years, Chinese fishing vessels have taken advantage of the tense situation in the Han River Estuary Neutral Zone and illegally fished in this area due to both North Korean and South Korean navies never patrolling this area due to the fear of naval battles breaking out. This has led to firefights and sinkings of boats between Chinese fishermen and South Korean Coast Guard. On 30 January 2019, North Korean and South Korean military officials signed a landmark agreement that would open the Han River Estuary to civilian vessels for the first time since the Armistice Agreement in 1953. The agreement was scheduled to take place in April 2019 but the failure of the 2019 Hanoi Summit indefinitely postponed these plans.

In 1962, the International Court of Justice had ordered the creation of a "provisional demilitarised zone" around Preah Vihear whose ownership is claimed by both Cambodia and Thailand.

During the Japanese occupation of Manchuria, when they administered as the puppet state of Manchukuo, the Tanggu Truce of May 1933 was concluded between China and Japan, establishing a demilitarised zone between Manchukuo and China. In 1937 Japan violated this truce with an invasion of the remainder of China. In 1945, after the fall of the Japanese empire at the end of the Asia-Pacific theatre of World War II, Manchuria was re-incorporated into China. Similarly, during the Vietnam War, there was a demilitarised zone between North Vietnam and South Vietnam. The zone was established in July 1954 as a result of the Geneva Conference ending the war between the Viet Minh and France. The DMZ in Vietnam officially lay at the 17th parallel but, in reality, extended about 1.5 km on either side of the Bến Hải River and west to east from the Lao border to the South China Sea. The Vietnamese demilitarised zone was abolished following the reunification of the country in 1976.

=== Europe and the Middle East ===
Demilitarised zones are common in Europe and the Middle East, especially in areas with territorial disputes in the aftermath of military conflicts.

Contemporary:

- The Green Line separating Southern Cyprus and Northern Cyprus is a demilitarised border zone operated by the United Nations Peacekeeping Force in Cyprus (Note: The peacekeeping force currently has its headquarters at the abandoned Nicosia International Airport, where the majority of peacekeepers are based and where talks between the two governments are held.) The buffer zone was established in 1974 due to ethnic tensions between Greek and Turkish Cypriots. The green line is similar in nature to the 38th parallel separating the Republic of Korea and North Korea.
- Åland – The Åland Convention of 1921, which was concluded following a decision of the League of Nations in response to the Åland crisis, mandates that the Finnish government maintain the territory as a demilitarised area.
- Ceuta border fence and Melilla border fence – A de facto demilitarised zone exists between the Spanish territories of Ceuta and Melilla and Morocco. Perimeter fences around both cities have been constructed by Spanish and Moroccan authorities, creating a demilitarised zone between the Spanish and Moroccan fences.
- Transnistria – The Joint Control Commission peacekeeping mission monitors a demilitarised security zone roughly outlining the Dniester between Moldova and the unrecognized Transnistria created by the ceasefire agreement ending the Transnistria War.
- Kuwait–Iraq barrier – The United Nations Security Council approved the creation of a demilitarised zone between Iraq and Kuwait in Resolution 689 after the Persian Gulf War. Although the demilitarised zone is no longer mandated by the council, it continues to exist.
- Sinai Peninsula – The Egypt–Israel peace treaty sets a limit to the amount of forces Egypt can place in the Sinai Peninsula. Parts of the peninsula are demilitarised to various degrees, especially within 20–40 kilometres of Israel. Israel also agreed to limit its forces within 3 kilometres of the Egyptian border. The areas are monitored by the Multinational Force and Observers. Because of the Sinai insurgency all sides agreed and encouraged Egypt to send large amounts of military forces into the area, including tanks and helicopters, to fight Islamist groups.
- Sudan – A 10 km demilitarised zone along the Sudan – South Sudan border.
- United Nations Disengagement Observer Force Zone – The United Nations Security Council approved the creation of a demilitarised zone in a portion of the Israeli-occupied territory of the Golan Heights in Syria in Resolution 350 after the Yom Kippur War. The zone is monitored by the United Nations Disengagement Observer Force.
- United Nations Interim Force in Lebanon – Created by the United Nations with the adoption of Security Council Resolution 425 and 426, to confirm Israeli withdrawal from Lebanon which Israel had invaded in 1978, to restore international peace and security, and help the Government of Lebanon restore its effective authority in the area.

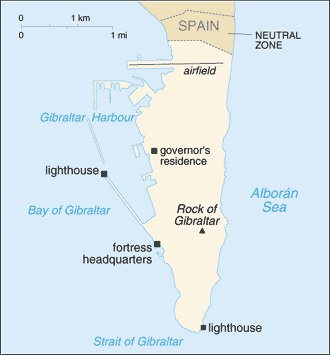
Historical map of the promontory of Gibraltar.

Historical:

- A neutral territory was established between the British Overseas Territory of Gibraltar and Spain after the end of the 1727 siege. A strip of land 600 toises (about 1.2 km) long, more than two cannon shots' distance between the British and Spanish guns, was called "the neutral ground" and shown as such on older maps. In 1908, the British built a fence in a portion claimed to be the British half of the neutral territory. Spain does not recognise British sovereignty over the isthmus (including the border), asserting it is Spanish soil. Although both the United Kingdom and Spain used to be part of the European Union (before the United Kingdom's exit), the border was a de facto international frontier with customs and immigration checks; Spain does not formally recognise it as a "frontier", referring to it as a "fence".
- Rhineland – The Treaty of Versailles designated the Rhineland as a demilitarised zone after World War I, prohibiting the Weimar Republic from deploying its military there. It was re-occupied and re-militarised in 1936 by Nazi Germany in violation of international treaties.
- Saudi–Iraqi neutral zone – The Uqair Protocol of 1922 established a demilitarised zone between the Sultanate of Nejd and the Kingdom of Iraq, which at the time was a League of Nations mandate administered by the British Empire. Nejd was later incorporated into the Kingdom of Saudi Arabia. The zone was partitioned in 1981 but the treaty was not filed with the United Nations. The zone was finally officially abolished during the Persian Gulf War, when Iraq and Saudi Arabia cancelled all international agreements with each other.
- Saudi–Kuwaiti neutral zone – The Uqair Protocol established a neutral zone between the Sultanate of Nejd and the British protectorate of Kuwait in 1922. It was partitioned by mutual agreement in 1970.
- Israel and Egypt:
  - Following the 1948 Arab–Israeli War, a demilitarised zone (the El Auja Zone) was created by the 1949 Armistice Agreements between Israel and Egypt.
- Israel and Jordan:
  - The Israeli enclave and Jordanian area on Mt. Scopus was designated as a DMZ.
  - The area around the Latrun salient.
- Israel and Syria: Following the 1948 Arab-Israeli War, three demilitarised zone were created by the 1949 Armistice Agreements between Israel and Syria.
- Norway and Sweden established a demilitarised zone of 1 km on each side of their border after the dissolution of the union between Norway and Sweden in 1905. The zone was abolished by mutual agreement in 1993.
- Northern Syria Buffer Zone – A 115 km demilitarised zone in northern Syria straddling portions of the Syria–Turkey border. It was established between Turkey and the United States, both NATO allies, during the Syrian Civil War to prevent clashes between Kurdish and Turkish forces. The DMZ collapsed in October 2019, after Turkey dismissed the agreement and the United States ordered a withdrawal of US forces from northern Syria, allowing the 2019 Turkish offensive into north-eastern Syria to go ahead.
- Ground Safety Zone – A 5 km demilitarised area between Serbia and Kosovo was created under the Kumanovo Agreement following the Kosovo War that existed between 1999 and 2001. Following the Insurgency in the Preševo Valley, Serbian forces were allowed to enter GSZ.
- Idlib demilitarisation agreement zone (2018–2019) – A 15 km demilitarised zone, created by agreement between Russian and Turkish government, splitting the last major stronghold of the Syrian rebels from the Syrian government controlled area amidst the Syrian Civil War. The zone was never fully implemented.

=== South America ===
Martin García Island – The Rio de la Plata Boundary Treaty of 1973 between Argentina and Uruguay established that the island would remain under Argentinean sovereignty but could only be used as a natural reserve of flora and fauna.

The El Caguán Demilitarised zone was established in southern Colombia between 1999 and 2002, during the failed peace process that involved the Government of President Andrés Pastrana and the Revolutionary Armed Forces of Colombia (FARC).

== Antarctica ==
Under the Antarctic Treaty, Antarctica is administered as an international zone. The treaty forbids military activity in Antarctica, such as "the establishment of military bases and fortifications, the carrying out of military maneuvers, as well as the testing of any type of weapon", although it does provide for the "use of military personnel or equipment for scientific research or for any other peaceful purpose". The treaty establishes the continent as a preserve for scientific research, suspends (Note: The treaty neither affirms nor rejects territorial claims previously asserted by parties but provides that no new territorial claims shall be asserted while it is in force and provides for the continent to by administered as an international zone during that time. The majority of Antarctica is claimed by one or more countries, but most countries do not explicitly recognise those claims. The area on the mainland between 90 degrees west and 150 degrees west is the only major land on Earth not claimed by any country. Until 2015 the interior of the Norwegian Sector, the extent of which had never been officially defined, was considered to be unclaimed. That year, Norway formally laid claim to the area between its Queen Maud Land and the South Pole.) all territorial claims over the continent, and permits all states to establish research stations on the continent.

Antarctica currently has no permanent population and therefore it has no citizenship nor government. Personnel present on Antarctica at any time are almost always citizens or nationals of some sovereignty outside Antarctica, as there is no Antarctic sovereignty. Consequently, individuals who commit crimes in Antarctica are typically subject to the jurisdiction of their country of nationality, the victim's country of nationality (if applicable), or the country administering the base in or expedition during which the crime occurred.

Governments that are party to the Antarctic Treaty and its Protocol on Environmental Protection implement the articles of these agreements, and decisions taken under them, through national laws. These laws generally apply only to their own citizens, wherever they are in Antarctica, and serve to enforce the consensus decisions of the consultative parties: about which activities are acceptable, which areas require permits to enter, what processes of environmental impact assessment must precede activities, and so on. The Antarctic Treaty is often considered to represent an example of the common heritage of mankind principle.

== Outer space ==
Outer space is generally regarded as an international zone insofar as it falls outside the national jurisdiction of any state. Article II of the Outer Space Treaty expressly forbids states from claiming celestial bodies such as the Moon or a planet as their own territory, whether by declaration, occupation, or "any other means". However, the state that launches a space object, such as a satellite or space station, retains jurisdiction and control over that object; by extension, a state is also liable for damages caused by its space object. Additionally, the treaty limits the use of the Moon and other celestial bodies to peaceful purposes and prohibits their use for testing weapons of any kind, conducting military manoeuvres, or establishing military bases, installations, and fortifications (Article IV). However, the treaty does not prohibit the placement of conventional weapons in orbit, and thus some highly destructive attack tactics, such as kinetic bombardment, are still potentially allowable. Furthermore, the treaty explicitly allows the use of military personnel and resources to support peaceful uses of space, mirroring the Antarctic Treaty's position on military deployment in that continent.

While most satellites and space stations are administered by the state that deployed them, the International Space Station is governed by an international framework established by the Agreement Concerning Cooperation on the Civil International Space Station. Under the agreement, each state is responsible for any liability associated with the components it contributes to the station and for the management of their programmes and use of the station. Furthermore, each participating state exercises criminal jurisdiction over its personnel on the station except where the victim of a crime is a national of another participating state and the perpetrator's state of nationality does not prosecute the offence.

== Other examples ==
- In 2024, Egypt announced the construction of a buffer zone around the Egypt-Gaza border.
- The Free City of Danzig was an international League of Nations protectorate that contained the Baltic Sea port of Danzig (now Gdańsk, Poland) and nearly 200 surrounding towns and villages that had a predominantly German population. It was created on 15 November 1920 in accordance with the 1919 Treaty of Versailles that ended World War I, which excluded the area from Weimar Germany and the new Second Polish Republic. The Free City had a customs union with Poland. The free city was dissolved on September 1st 1939 during the invasion of Poland.
- During the allied occupation of Vienna between 1945 and 1955, a small international zone in the historical city centre was governed in rotation by American, British, French, and Soviet troops.
- During the Cold War, the Friedrichstraße station was served by West Berlin S-Bahn and U-Bahn trains despite being located entirely in East Berlin. (Note: West Berliners could transfer between the S-Bahn, U-Bahn and long-distance trains to the West without passing through East German border control. The station featured an East German government-run Intershop, which sold duty-free and high-quality items at lower prices compared to the West.) The station also served as a border crossing between West Berlin and East Germany.
- Under the 1947 United Nations Partition Plan for Palestine, the city of Jerusalem was supposed to become an international corpus separatum. This was never implemented; the city was the scene of fierce fighting in the 1948 war which culminated in its partition between West Jerusalem (Israel) and East Jerusalem (Jordan). In the 1967 war, East Jerusalem was captured and unilaterally annexed by Israel, in a move that has not been recognised by the international community. The idea of an international zone in Jerusalem, encompassing at least the highly sensitive Old City, continues to feature in many proposals to resolve the Israeli-Palestinian conflict.
- The Free Territory of Trieste was an international zone around the Adriatic Sea port of Trieste, under direct responsibility of the United Nations Security Council. The area was established on 10 February 1947 by a protocol of the Treaty of Peace with Italy to accommodate an ethnically and culturally mixed population in a neutral environment free from the rule of either Italy or Yugoslavia, which made competing claims on the territory. The Free Territory was de facto given to its two neighbours in 1954 and this was formalised much later by the bilateral Treaty of Osimo of 1975, ratified in 1977.

== Gallery ==
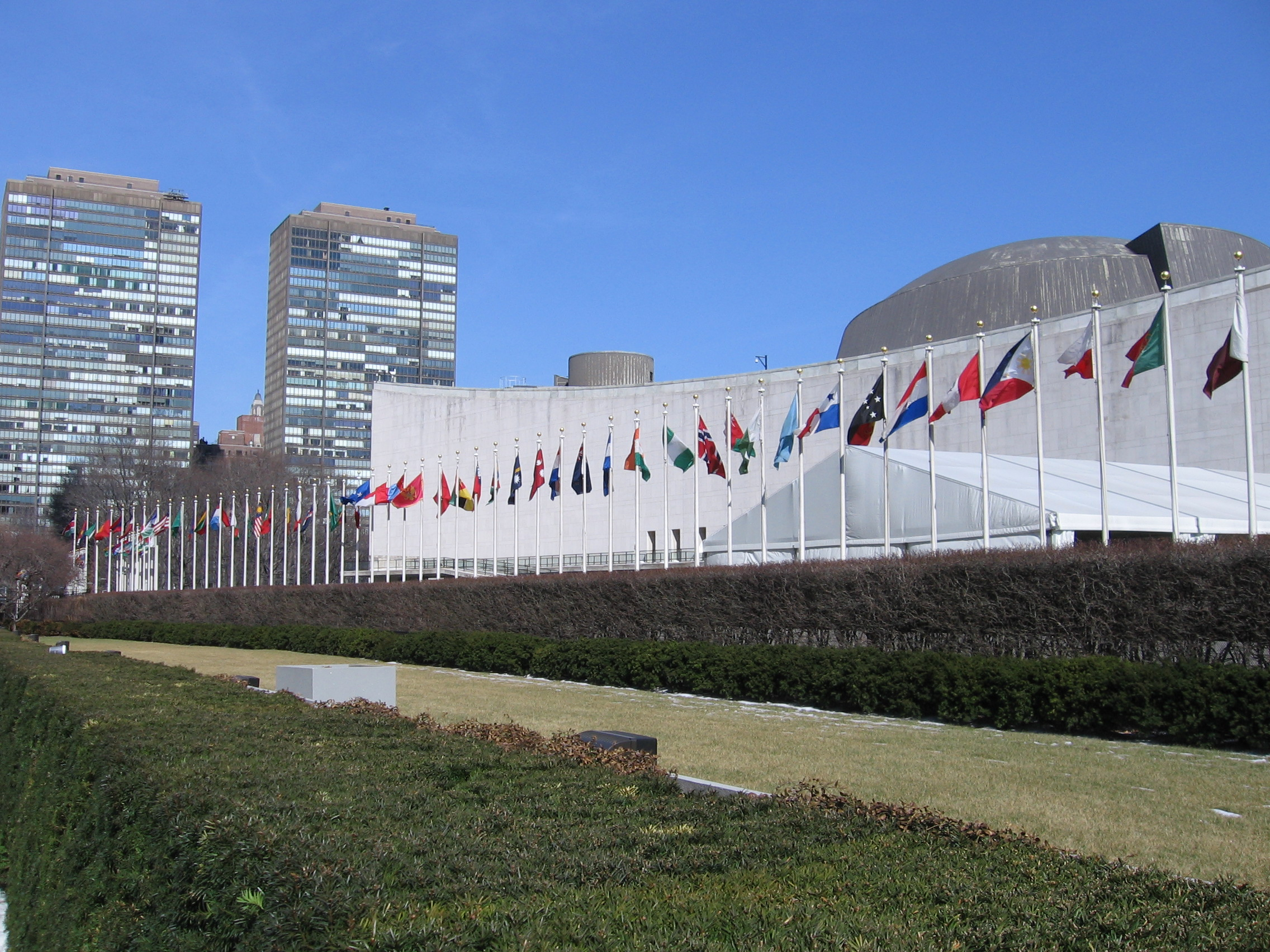
Flags of United Nations member states flying outside the United Nations Headquarters complex in New York City.

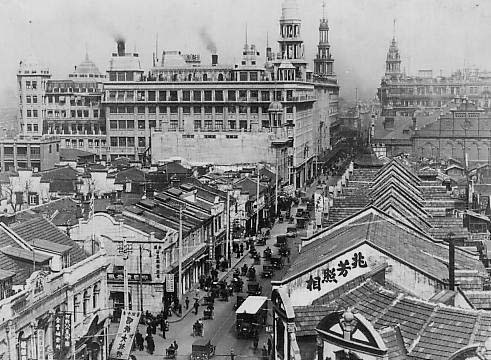
Nanjing Road in Shanghai, within the Shanghai International Settlement, a concession administered by multiple foreign powers during the late Qing Dynasty.

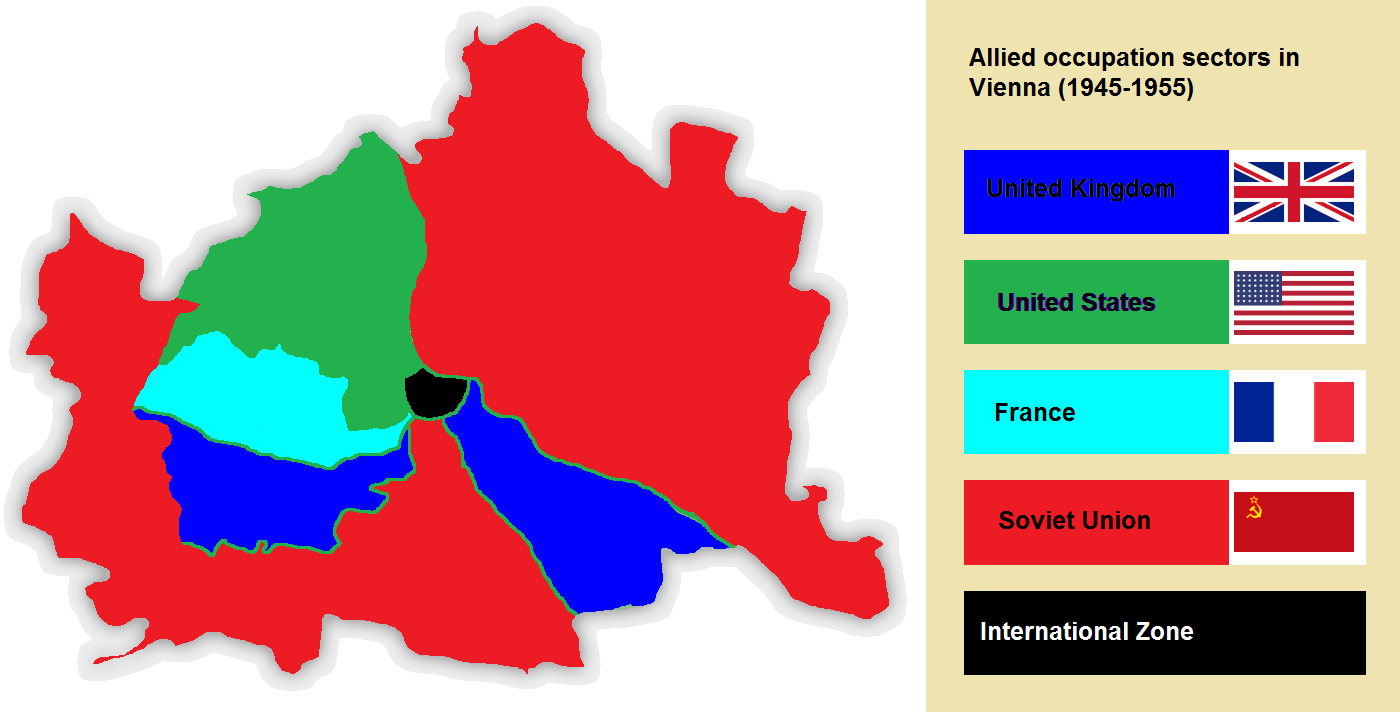
The four sectors of occupation in Vienna between 1945 and 1955.

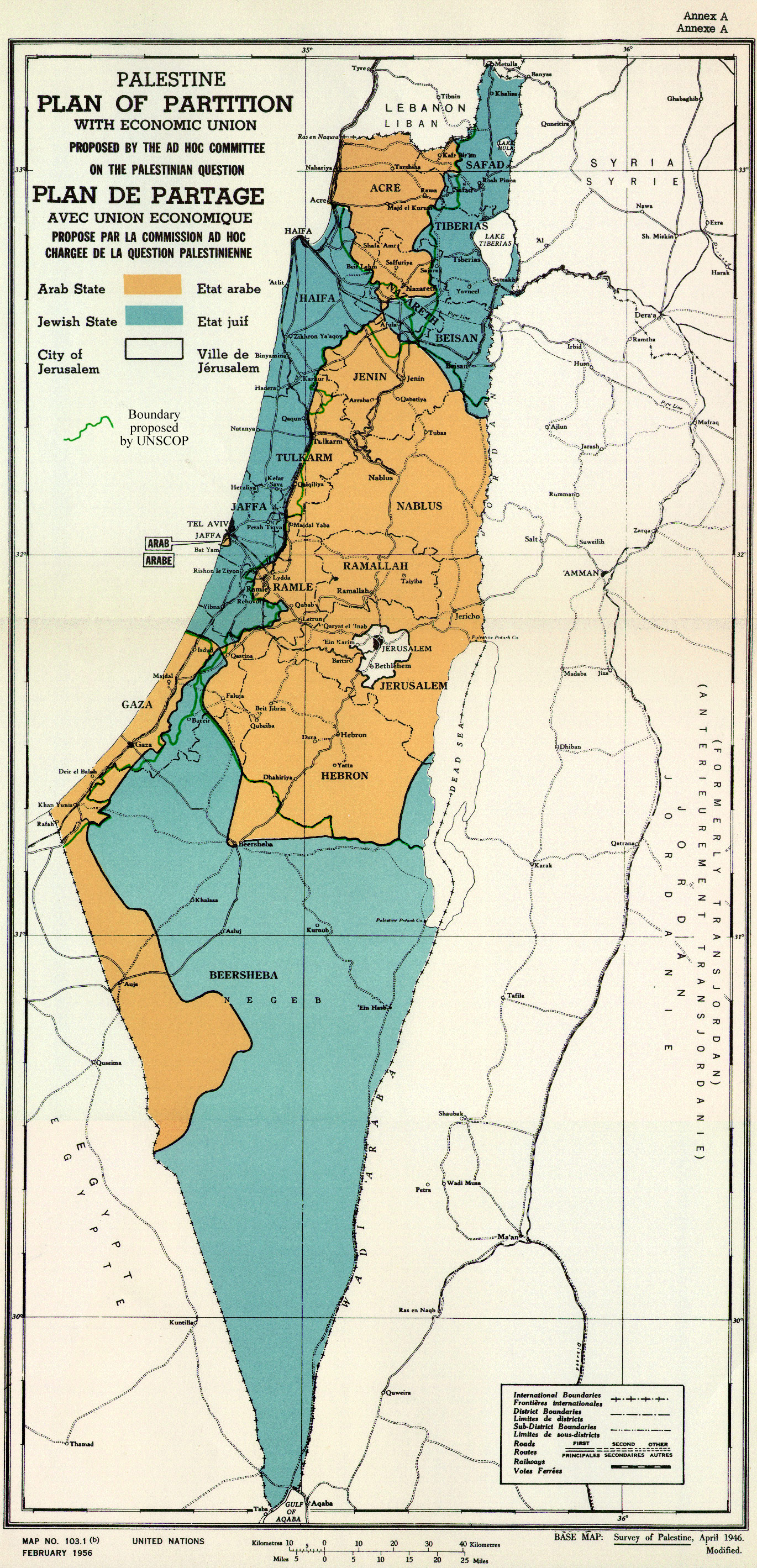
United Nations Partition Plan for Palestine, showing the city of Jerusalem as an international zone

Map of the Free Territory of Trieste, showing its two administrative zones, one of which was later absorbed by each of its two neighbours (Slovenia and Croatia were both part of Yugoslavia at the time).

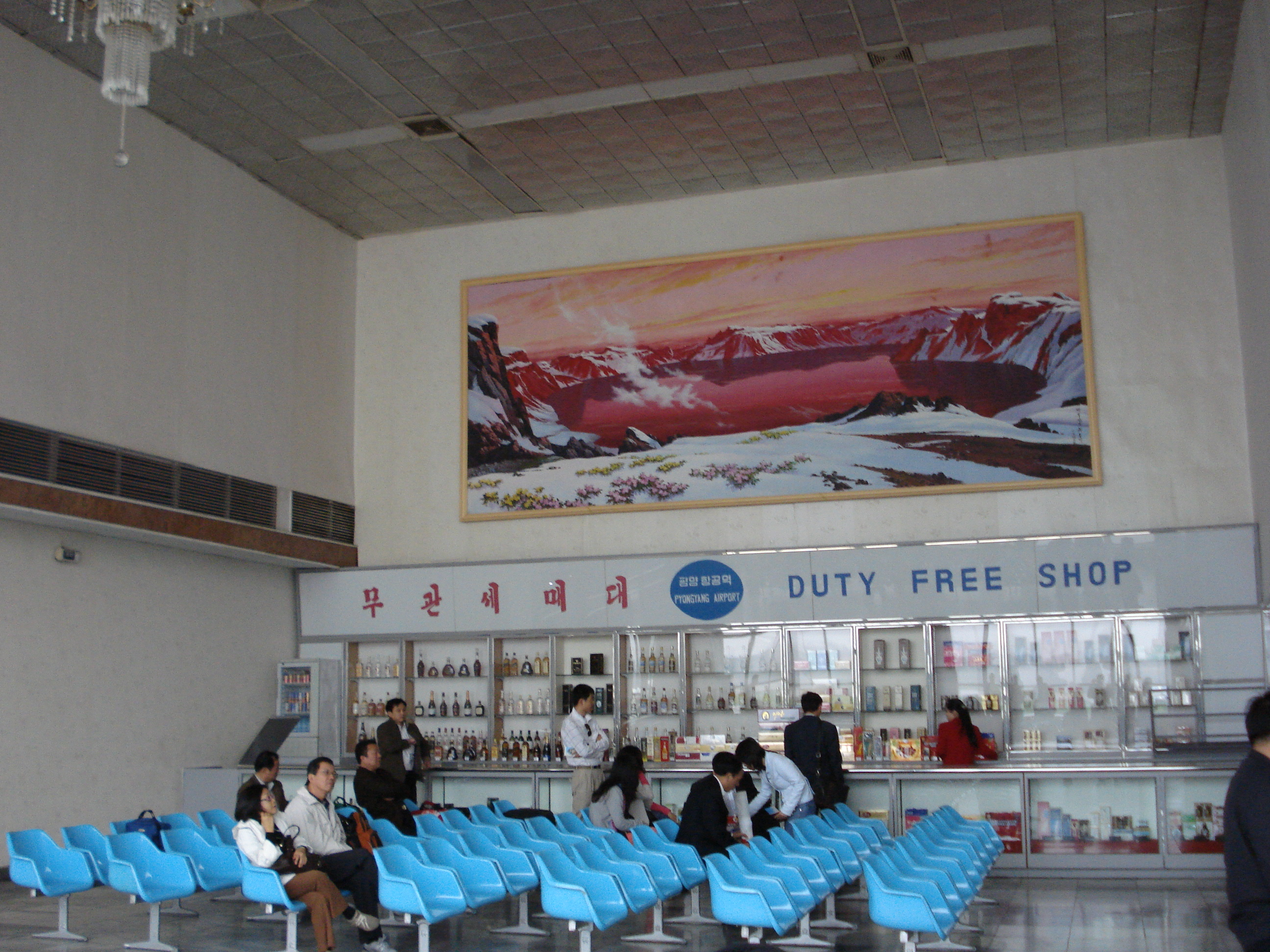
Duty Free Shop in the sterile zone of Pyongyang Sunan International Airport

== Sources ==
- Cassel, Pär (2012). Grounds of Judgment. New York: Oxford UP. ISBN 978-0-19-979205-4.
- Department of State, United States of America (1998). "AGREEMENT AMONG THE GOVERNMENT OF CANADA, GOVERNMENTS OF MEMBER STATES OF THE EUROPEAN SPACE AGENCY, THE GOVERNMENT OF JAPAN, THE GOVERNMENT OF THE RUSSIAN FEDERATION, AND THE GOVERNMENT OF THE UNITED STATES OF AMERICA CONCERNING COOPERATION ON THE CIVIL INTERNATIONAL SPACE STATION" (PDF).
