= Romaña (guerrilla leader) =

Colombian guerilla leader (1965–2021)

Henry Castellanos Garzón, a.k.a. "Romaña", (20 March 1965 – 5 December 2021) was a Colombian guerrilla commander of the Revolutionary Armed Forces of Colombia. Castellanos Garzón was a member of the Estado Mayor and the Commander of several Eastern Bloc of the FARC-EP fronts.

According to the United States government, Castellanos Garzón was involved in drug trafficking for the FARC since the mid-1980s.

== Reported death in September 2010 ==
On 23 September 2010, the Colombian press reported that Romaña was killed on 22 September during "Operation Sodom"- the same military operation that was credited with killing FARC commander Mono Jojoy. Colombian authorities could not confirm his death nor find his body.

In May 2011, Colombian president Juan Manuel Santos confirmed on his presidential website that Romana survived the attack.

In October 2014, Romana went to Cuba as part of the negotiating team involved in successful peace talks with the Colombian government.

== Death ==
In December 2021, Venezuelan and Colombian media reported that Romaña was killed in Venezuela's western department of Apure, alongside one of his closest allies, Hernán Darío Velásquez, better known as "El Paisa." This news was later confirmed by Colombia's Defense Minister as photos of Romaña's body circulated online.
