= Luis Fernando Ramírez =

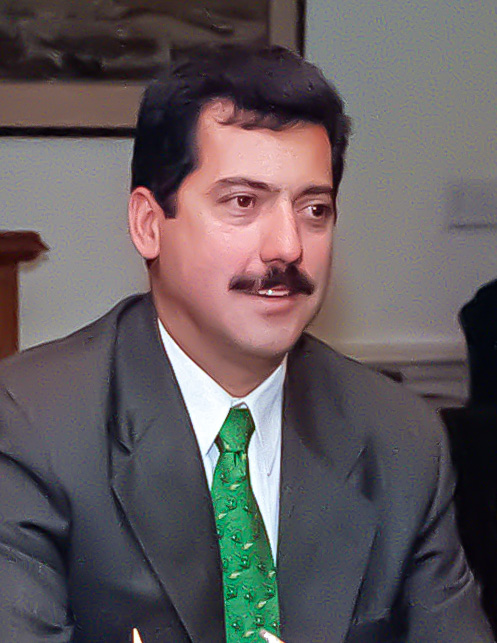
- Ramírez in 2001

Minister of National Defence
- In office 30 May 1999 – 25 May 2001
- President: Andrés Pastrana
- Preceded by: Rodrigo Lloreda
- Succeeded by: Gustavo Adolfo Bell

Minister of Labour and Social Protection
- In office 4 July 1992 – 19 March 1994
- President: César Gaviria
- Preceded by: José Elías Melo Acosta
- Succeeded by: Gerardo Hernández Correa

Personal details
- Born: November 23, 1959 (age 66) Suaita, Santander, Colombia
- Party: New Democratic Force
- Education: Jorge Tadeo Lozano University
- Profession: Accountant

Luis Fernando Ramírez Acuña (born November 23, 1959) is a Colombian public accountant, former defense and labor minister and vice presidential candidate. Ramírez led the Ministry of Defense during President Andrés Pastrana's government and had to deal with the peace process (1999–2002) between the government and the Revolutionary Armed Forces of Colombia (FARC). In May 2001 Ramirez quit his job as defense minister. As Minister of Labor he was the leader of the Social Security Reform that introduced in Colombia the capitalization system run by private pension Funds. Ramirez also served as Vice Minister of Finance and was also director of the Internal Revenue System.

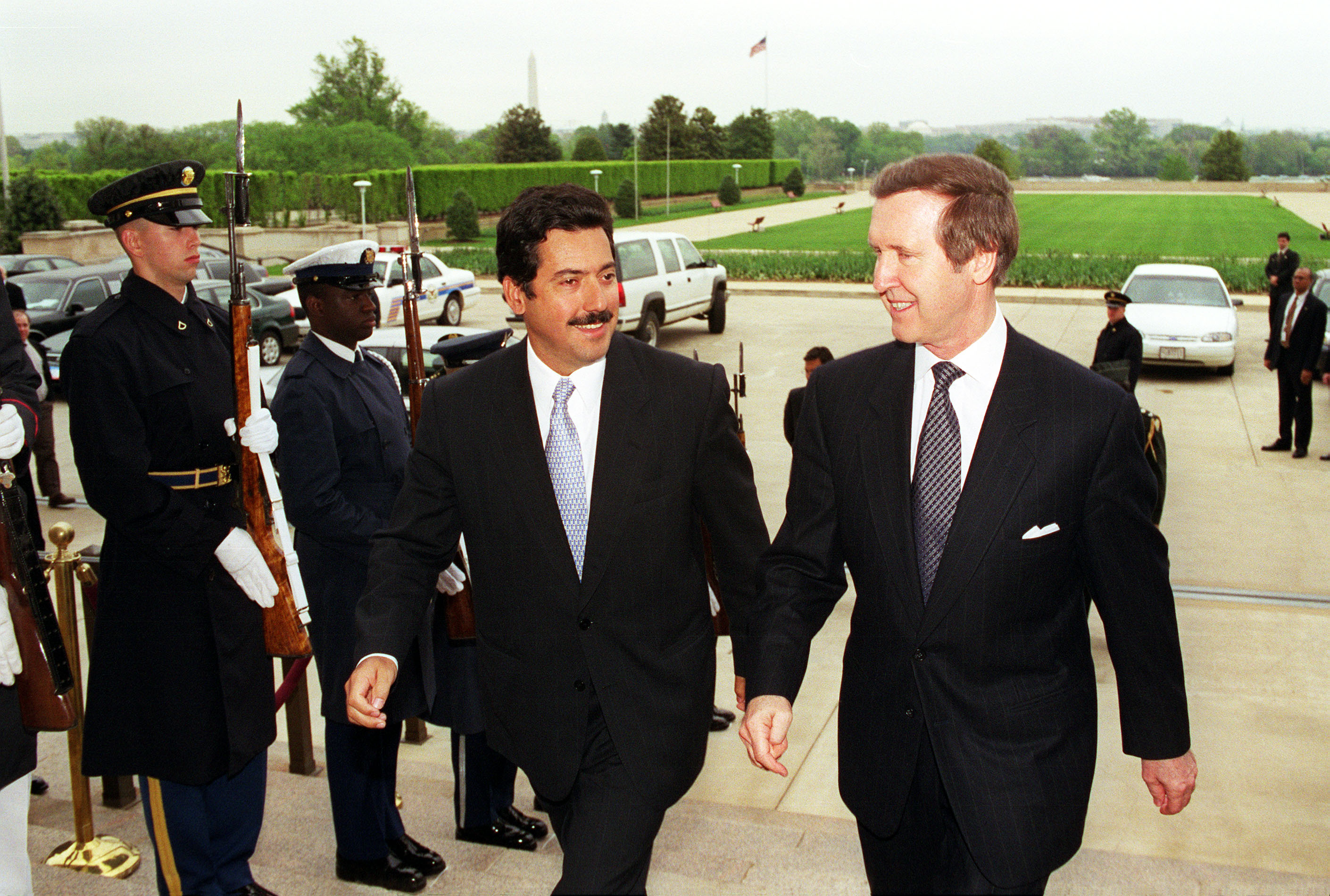
Minister Ramírez with his counterpart, United States Secretary of Defense William Cohen during an official visit to Washington, D.C. in 2000.
