= Eastern Bloc of the FARC-EP =

Colombian guerrilla faction

The Eastern Bloc of the Revolutionary Armed Forces of Colombia, from September 2010 known as Bloque Comandante Jorge Briceño, in honour of the slain guerrilla leader, was considered to be the strongest military faction of the guerrilla group. It was divided into groups of 50–400 combatants in each group, which patrolled and controlled different areas of Colombia's Eastern and Central-Eastern territory, as well as helped to carry out the killings, taxation, and arrests necessary to advance the organization's financial and political goals.

The specific divisions of the group are arguable. Some of the believed divisions or 'fronts', as they were commonly called, are shown below. Many of these fronts sometimes worked together towards a certain mission, while others were further divided into 'columns' and 'companies' with a smaller number of members. For more general information see FARC Chain of Command.

== Commanders ==
This group of commanders was called the "EMBO" (Estado Mayor del Bloque Oriental).

Alias	Name	Note
"El Simio"	Juan Esteban Arias Robayo	Commands Bloque Jorge Briceño
"El picha corta"	Juan Camilo Pita Gordillo	
"Pipilin/Felipelotas"	Felipe Avella Rincón	"si cae una caen tres"
Carlos Antonio Lozada		Injured by a Colombian army attack in August 2007.
"Romaña"	Henry Castellanos Garón	
"Manuel" or "Pata Palo"	Pablo Emilio Rodríguez	After the death of "Mono Jojoy", he took over the finances of the Eastern Bloc, under the orders of his brother Noe Suarez Rojas, alias "Grannobles". Captured in April 2011.
Andrés París		
Alexandra	Tanja Nijmeijer	
"Brian", "Braian", or "Brayan"	Fardy Edilson Para Parra	Involved in extortion on behalf of FARC. He belonged to the front 27, 31, 40 and 53, respectively. Captured on September 2, 2011.

== 1st Front ==
Also known as the Armando Ríos Front, it was composed of around to 400 people. It operated mostly in the Guaviare Department.

Alias	Name	Note
Reynaldo		
César	Gerardo Aguilar Ramírez	Arrested in 2008 during Operation Jaque.
Doris Adriana	Luz Dary Conde	Arrested in 2008.
Alfredo		Handed himself over to the Army in April 2010 with "Jair" and a hostage girl.
Jair		Handed himself over to the Army in April 2010 with "Alfredo" and a hostage girl.

== 7th Front ==
Also known as the Jacobo Prías Alape Front, it was composed of up to 400 people. It operated mostly in the Meta Department.

Alias	Name	Note
Nancy	Astrid Conte Gutierrez	One of the leaders of the Front, captured in June 2012.

== 10th Front ==
Also known as the Guadalupe Salcedo Front, it was composed of up to 300 people. It operated mostly in the Arauca Department.

Several police officers infiltrated one of the FARC’s 10th front camp in early 2008, preparing an attack on the camp by a police squadron. The attack came on July 29, killing 'Jurga Jurga', FARC commander and friend of FARC head ‘Mono Jojoy’. The ground offensive was follow by an airforce attack, killing 20 guerrillas, unofficial sources said. On October 22, 2011, members of the front killed 10 Colombians soldiers in an ambush in Arauca. On March 17, 2012, alleged members of the 10th front killed 11 members of the Colombian army. Security forces launched an offensive few days after the attack: on March 20, 3 alleged member of the FARC are killed and 4 captured by the army. On March 21, 33 FARC members were allegedly killed and 5 others captured.

Alias	Name	Note
"El Marrano"	Carlos Julio Ávila	Accused of executing three US citizens in 1999.
"Jurga Jurga"		Killed by Colombian security forces on July 29, 2008
"Camilo Tuerto"		Captured by Colombian security forces on April 11, 2009. Also second in command for the Reinel Mendez Company.
"Lorena"		Captured on May 16, 2010, member of the Reinel Mendez Company.
"Milton Díaz"	Jhon Javier Ariza Gil	Also second in command for the Mobile Column Afonso Castellanos. Killed by Colombian security forces in August, 2010
"Fabian"		Killed by Colombian security forces on October 8, 2010, he had replaced "Milton".
"Katerine"	María Johana Arias Jáuregui	Killed by Colombian security forces on October 8, 2010 She was lover of alias "Grannobles".
"Viviana"		Alleged guerrilla girlfriend of 10th Front commander "Efren". Wounded and captured in July 2011.
"Perico"		One of the head front commander, captured on October 25.
"Misael		Second front commander. Killed on March 21st, 2012.
"Carracho"	Danielo Benavidez	Financial and logistical head of the front. Captured on August 18, 2012.
"Yudi"		Alleged "Carracho" daughter. Medics of the front. Captured on August 18, 2012.
"David" and "Chocha Linda"	William Alexander Salazar Acosta	Front commander. Killed on September 23, 2012.

== 16th Front ==
Also known as the Jose A. Paez Front, it was composed of up to 300 people. It operated mostly in the Vichada Department.

Alias	Name	Note
Guillermo		
"El Negro Acacio"	Tomás Medina Caracas	Killed in 2007.
Gentil Alvis Patiño, "El Chigüiro"	Juan José Martínez Vega	Captured in Venezuela in 2005.
"Octavio Cocopi"		Killed on January 1, 2011.

== 22nd Front ==
Also known as the Simón Bolívar Front, it was composed of up to 120 people. It operated mostly in the Cundinamarca Department.

Alias	Name	Note
Hugo	Wílmer Antonio Marín Cano	Captured in 2003.
"Géner Lara Muñoz", "Lucio" or "Lucio 40"	Néstor Ramírez Muñoz	He is a nephew of Luis Alberto Morantes, alias "Jacobo Arenas" (Founder and leader of FARC). Captured in April 2011.
Judith	Paola Andrea Arévalo	Captured in April 2011.

== 26th Front ==
Also known as the Hermogenes Maza Front, it was composed of up to 130 people. It operated mostly in the Meta Department. As of 2011 this front operated in La Uribe, Vista Hermosa, La Macarena and other municipalities.

Alias	Name	Note
Hugo Sandóval Ruiz	Ángel Oviedo Yara	Killed in 2007.
Hermidas	Wálter Flórez Candil	Captured in 2004.
Pablo Neruda	Fabián Bedoya Salamanca	Captured on April 10, 2010.
Kevin		Demobilized in April 2010.
Gabino		Demobilized in April 2010.
"Jaime Guey" or "Guaimaro"		Captured in April 2010, by the Police in Engativá (Cundinamarca).

== 27th Front ==
It was composed of up to 500 people and operated mostly in the Meta Department.

Alias	Name	Note
Arcesio Niño		Killed on 22-03-12.
Efrén	Luis Eduardo López Méndez	
"Jhon 40"	Gener García Molina	
"El médico" or "el tío"	Elver Uriel Rodriguez	Captured on March 27, 2008
El Pija	Rodrigo Gaitán Rincón	Captured on April 5, 2010.
Pitufo	Bertulfo Caicedo Garzón	Captured. Jailed in the Cómbita prison.
Mariela		Handed herself to the Army on October 28, 2010.

== 28th Front ==
Also known as the José María Córdoba Front, it was composed of up to 120 people. It operated mostly in the Casanare and Boyacá Departments.

Alias	Name	Note
Julián Arévalo	Aristipo Aponte Alvarado	Killed in April 2014.
Alberto Guevara	José Nelson Garzón	Captured in 2003.
Pirinolo	Alexánder Beltrán	Warder of the US hostages Gonsalves, Stansell and Howes. Captured in February 2011.

== 31st Front ==
This front was composed by up to 120 combatants and operated mostly in the Meta Department. Its activity diminished notoriously after its head, Duván Alberto Cartagena, was captured.

== 38th Front ==
Also known as the Ciro Trujillo Castaño Front, it was composed of up to 100 people. It operated mostly in the Casanare and the Boyacá Departments.

Alias	Name	Note
Rogelio		Front leader
Karen		Bodyguard of Efraín Méndez, killed in April 2012
Sandra		Bodyguard of Efraín Méndez, killed in April 2012
Sucre		Bodyguard of Efraín Méndez, killed in April 2012
Yaír	Félix Antonio Lara Cifuentes	Captured in 2004.

== 39th Front ==
Also known as the Joaquin Ballen Front, it was composed of anything between 40 and 300 people. It operated mostly in the Vichada Department. The front was led by El Cadete.

Alias	Name	Note
"Jacinto", "El Danto"		Killed in 2003.
"El Topo"	Octavio Ruiz	Earlier he had belonged to the 16th Front. Killed on August 10, 2010.

== 40th Front ==
Also known as the Jacobo Arenas Front, it was composed of up to 350 people. It operated mostly in the Meta Department.

Alias	Name	Note
"El Flaco Iván"	Rodrigo Alberto Salazar Montoya	Captured in 2005.
Chucho	Gilberto de Jesús Jaramillo Arias	Captured in 2005.
Tocayo, El Negro		Demobilized in April 2010. (Son of John Freddy Balcázar alias “El Negro Antonio”)
Santiago		Handed himself over to the Army in July 2010.
Caballo		Demobilized on October 26, 2010.

== 42nd Front ==
Also known as the Combatientes de Cundinamarca Front, it was composed of up to 110 people. It operated mostly in the Cundinamarca Department.

Alias	Name	Note
Javier Jota		Front leader since February 2012. Killed in March 2012.
Eduardo Robayo	Wilson Correa Trujillo	Front leader since May 2011. Killed in February 2012.
Mono Jojoy	Victor Rojas Suarez	Front leader, killed in May 2011.
"El Campesino"	José Nerup Reyes Peña	Killed in 2007.
"Serrucho"	Pedro León García	Captured in 2003.

== 43rd Front ==
It was composed of up to 300 people and operated mostly in the Meta Department.

Alias	Name	Note
"John 40"	Gener García Molina	Believe to be wounded after police attack in September 2008
Efrén	Luis Eduardo López Méndez	

== 44th Front ==
Also known as the Antonio Ricaurte Front, it was composed of up to 350 people. It operated mostly in the Meta Department.

Alias	Name	Note
Miguel	Luis Fernando Bustos	
Albeiro Córdoba	Élmer Mata Caviedes	Killed in 2005.
"Ciro Pereza", "Ciro Cañón"		Handed himself to the Army on October 28, 2010.
Demaris		Handed herself to the Army on October 28, 2010.
Bricelda		Handed herself to the Army on October 28, 2010.
"Ricardo Pompis"		Handed himself to the Army on October 28, 2010.
Omar		Handed himself to the Army on October 28, 2010.
Angie		Killed in combat on October 28, 2010.

== 45th Front ==
Also known as the Atanasio Girardot Front, it was composed of up to 150 people. It operated mostly in the Boyacá and Norte de Santander Departments.

Alias	Name	Note
Rafael Gutierrez	Luis Eduardo Marín	
"Che"	Jesús María Piedrahita	Killed in 2005.

== 51st Front ==
Also known as the Jaime Pardo Leal Front, it was composed of up to 80 people. It operated mostly in the Cundinamarca Department.

Alias	Name	Note
"R1"	Second in command	KIA on August 15, 2011.
"Hermides", "El Quemado"	José Parménides Castro	Captured in 2002.
	Pedro Orjuela	Explosive expert. Captured on May 5, 2011.
"Indio" or "César"	Neil Russel González Garay	Second commander of this front. He was under direct orders of alias "Mono Jojoy". Captured in September, 2011.

== 52nd Front ==
Also known as the Juan de la Cruz Front, it was composed of up to 120 people. It operated mostly in the Cundinamarca and Boyacá Departments.

Alias	Name	Note
"El Zarco"	Manuel Sierra	Also commands 53rd Front.
Arcesio Angarilla		Killed in 2004.

== 53rd Front ==
Also known as the Jose A. Anzoategui Front, it was composed of up to 120 people. It operated mostly in the Meta and Cundinamarca Departments.

Alias	Name	Note
"El Zarco"	Manuel Sierra	Also commands 52nd Front.
"Romaña"	Henry Castellanos Garzón	Commander of several FARC Fronts.
Eliécer	Bertulfo García	Captured in 2005.
Dionilde		Handed herself to the Army on October 28, 2010.

== 54th Front ==
Also known as the Angel Bonilla, it was composed of up to 50 militants. It operated mainly in the Meta Department.

Alias	Name	Note
Flaminio Gómez	Jesús Vargas Gamboa	Killed in 2002.
Silverio	Salvador Vargas León	Killed in 2003.

== 55th Front ==
Also known as the Teófilo Forero Front, it was composed of around 150 militants, although the members of its urban network were much greater. It operated mostly in the Cundinamarca Department, and was considered the FARC's base in Bogotá. It was considered responsible for much of the terrorist activity that occurred in and around the capital.

Alias	Name	Note
Nelson Robles	Julio Enrique Rincón Rico	
Rubén	Armando Barbosa Tovar	
Patricia		Demobilized in April 2010.
Conejo		Demobilized in April 2010.
El Flaco		Demobilized in April 2010.
Chaño		Demobilized in April 2010.
Luz Dary	Maryuri Sáenz	Killed in April 2010.
“Efren” or “Patequeso”	Marco Elvis Patiño	second-in-command, captured in July 2012.

== 56th Front ==
It was composed by up to 80 people and operated mostly in the Casanare and Boyacá Departments.

Alias	Name	Note
Jerónimo Aljure	Jorge Eliécer Jiménez Martínez	Captured in 2004.

== 62nd Front ==
Also known as the Yarí Front. Operated in the Meta Department. On February 14, 2012, alias Dumar, his lover alias Gisella and two other rebels were killed by the army. Four other have been captured.

Alias	Name	Note
Victor Tirado	Rigoberto Lozano	First commander.
Dumar		Killed on February 14, 2012.
Yira	Devora Meza Velazco	She was third commander and chief of finance of this front. Killed in September 2011.

== Antonio Nariño Front ==
It was an urban network composed of up to 50 individuals, and operated in Bogotá.

Alias	Name	Note
Negro Antonio	Bernardo Mosquera Machado	Arrested in 2009.
Chucho	Jose Marvel Zamora	Arrested in 2008.
La Mona	Luz Delia Hincapié Gaviria	Arrested on October 20, 2010, while she was overseeing a car bomb preparation.

== Urías Rondón Front ==
Alias	Name	Note
"Elver Patón"	Néstor Raúl González Restrepo	Fifth head of the Urías Rondón Front and its chief financial officer. Arrested on September 24, 2011.
Nayibe	Edna Margarita Lozada Forero	Part of the security ring of alias "Elver Patón". Arrested on September 24, 2011.
	Sebastián Castaño Mojica	Part of the security ring of alias "Elver Patón". Arrested on September 24, 2011.

== Columns and Companies ==
The following columns and companies also were part of the Eastern Bloc:

- Compañía Marquetalia: Formed in January 2011. Operated in the Meta department. 54 members. According to a report in El Espectador, the column's medics treated the local population, providing basic health services where the state presence was nonexistent.
- Mobile Column Alfonso Castellanos: Faction of the 10th front, composed by up to 120 members. Operated in the Arauca Department. His leader, "Gabino", was killed on August 24, 2008, by the Colombian Military. The second-in-command, John Javier Ariza Gil, alias "Milton Diaz, has been killed on August 19, 2010.
- Mobile Column Juan José Rondón: It was composed by up to 250 members and operated mostly in the Guaviare Department. Its last known leader, Octavio Salamanca, alias "Urias Cuéllar", was killed in 2001.
- Special Forces: It is composed by up to 80 men and operated in what used to be the demilitarized zone.
- Company Reinel Méndez: It was composed by up to 80 men and operated in what used to be the demilitarized zone.
- Company Esteban Ramírez: It was composed by up to 80 men and operated in what used to be the demilitarized zone.
- Company Manuela Beltrán: It was composed by up to 50 men and operated in the Cundinamarca Department. Its leader, Neftaly Murcia Vargas, known as “Camilo Tabaco”, was killed on September 3, 2008, according to the Colombian Army.
- Company Abelardo Romero: It is composed by up to 40 men and operates in the Cundinamarca Department. On March 26, 2012, tens of member of the front were killed by an offensive of the army including the Company leader "Alonso Rivas". Yesid Borracho, the successor of Alonso Rivas, was killed on July 30.
- Company Joaquín Ballén: It was composed by up to 140 men and operated in the Cundinamarca Department.
- Company Che Guevara: Faction of the Eastern and Caribbean Blocs, composed by up to 120 members. Operated in what used to be the demilitarized zone.

== See also ==
- Western Bloc of the FARC-EP
- Southern Bloc of the FARC-EP
- Northwestern Bloc of the FARC-EP
