= Andrés París =

Andrés París is a Colombian guerrilla fighter, member of the FARC-EP and a high-ranking chief of the Eastern Bloc of the FARC-EP. According to El Espectador he is a possible candidate to the FARC's ruling seven member secretariat.
