= Tello, Huila =

Coordinates: 3°04′N 75°08′W

- Municipality and town
- Flag Coat of arms

- Location of the municipality and town of Tello, Huila in the Huila Department of Colombia.
- Country: Colombia
- Department: Huila Department

Area
  - Total: 494 km^{2} (191 sq mi)
- Elevation: 575 m (1,886 ft)

Population (Census 2018)
  - Total: 10,273
  - Density: 20.8/km^{2} (53.9/sq mi)
- Time zone: UTC-5 (Colombia Standard Time)

Tello is a town and municipality in the Huila Department, Colombia. It is characterized by its extensive plain between the Magdalena River and the foot of the Cordillera Oriental mountain range up to its peaks, with the Fortalecillas and Villavieja rivers located nearby. Its territorial extension is 589 km², its altitude is 575 meters above sea level and its climate is warm with an average temperature of 26°C.

It has a population of 14,536 inhabitants according to the DANE projection for 2019. The urban area of the municipality is located in the northeast part of the department (Sub-North Region). Its economy is based on agricultural production and livestock activity. Fruits such as grapes and bananas, from which 91% of the total output is produced in the department, stimulate its economy, which is considered the basis of the development of the region. It is known as "El Viñedo del Huila".

== History ==
In 1811, Don Juan José Mesa donated the necessary land, on his farm "Matarredonda" for the settlement that was called the hacienda. In 1925, it was elevated to the category of municipality with the name of Tello, in honor of the war hero José María Tello.

Within its history, the period of political rivalry between liberals and conservatives in 1848 stands out. With monumental events, such as the burning of the San Andrés Town Center in 1950, and the hundreds of homicides in the still existing place El Puente De Los Decapitales, where more than 500 inhabitants were shot, beheaded, and hanged, most of them men who could be of voting or fighting age. The massacre was done in order to avoid their incorporation into the growing Colombian Guerrillas of the time. The bodies were quartered at the hands of the Goths, a faction of the conservatives, and placed the parts in a row, embedded in the sand on the side of the road to remind the Liberals of the power that the conservative party had in Tello at that time. Other memories of the crumbling history, including Huila's red squares in 1950, is compiled in the literary work La Carnicería written in 2010.

== Climate ==
Climate data for Tello (Portal El), elevation 1,300 m (4,300 ft), (1981–2010)
Month	Jan	Feb	Mar	Apr	May	Jun	Jul	Aug	Sep	Oct	Nov	Dec	Year
Mean daily maximum °C (°F)	26.2 (79.2)	26.5 (79.7)	26.3 (79.3)	25.9 (78.6)	25.9 (78.6)	26.1 (79.0)	26.2 (79.2)	27.2 (81.0)	27.6 (81.7)	26.4 (79.5)	25.1 (77.2)	25.3 (77.5)	26.2 (79.2)
Daily mean °C (°F)	22.2 (72.0)	22.4 (72.3)	22.2 (72.0)	22.0 (71.6)	22.0 (71.6)	22.1 (71.8)	22.0 (71.6)	22.5 (72.5)	22.8 (73.0)	22.1 (71.8)	21.6 (70.9)	21.7 (71.1)	22.1 (71.8)
Mean daily minimum °C (°F)	18.8 (65.8)	18.8 (65.8)	18.7 (65.7)	18.6 (65.5)	18.7 (65.7)	18.6 (65.5)	18.4 (65.1)	18.7 (65.7)	18.9 (66.0)	18.5 (65.3)	18.2 (64.8)	18.5 (65.3)	18.6 (65.5)
Average precipitation mm (inches)	94.4 (3.72)	106.7 (4.20)	170.8 (6.72)	176.2 (6.94)	142.6 (5.61)	70.6 (2.78)	60.7 (2.39)	41.7 (1.64)	67.6 (2.66)	200.2 (7.88)	214.6 (8.45)	141.4 (5.57)	1,487.5 (58.56)
Average precipitation days	12	14	18	21	23	19	18	16	17	21	21	18	215
Average relative humidity (%)	79	78	80	81	81	78	77	72	72	77	82	83	79
Source: Instituto de Hidrologia Meteorologia y Estudios Ambientales
