= Puerto Lleras =

Coordinates: 3°16′10″N 73°22′30″W

- Municipality and town
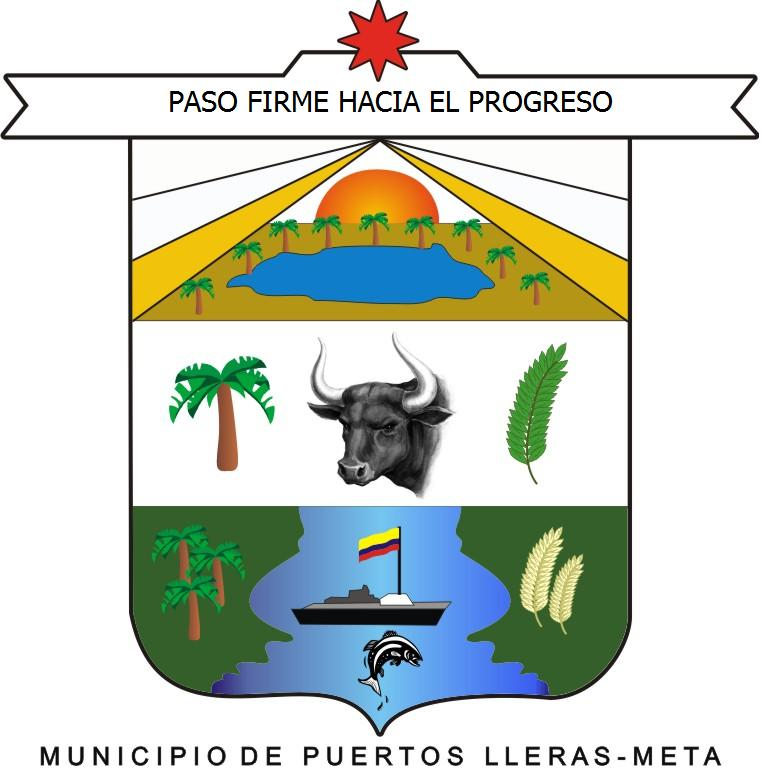
- Flag Coat of arms

- Location of the municipality and town of Puerto Lleras in the Meta Department of Colombia.
- Country: Colombia
- Department: Meta Department

Area
  - Total: 2,061 km^{2} (796 sq mi)
- Elevation: 450 m (1,480 ft)

Population (Census 2018)
  - Total: 8,982
  - Density: 4.358/km^{2} (11.29/sq mi)
- Time zone: UTC-5 (Colombia Standard Time)
- Climate: Am

Puerto Lleras is a town and municipality in the Meta Department, Colombia.

The town is on the Ariari River, and is served by Puerto Lleras Airport.

== Climate ==
Climate data for Puerto Lleras (Pto Lleras), elevation 245 m (804 ft), (1981–2010)
Month	Jan	Feb	Mar	Apr	May	Jun	Jul	Aug	Sep	Oct	Nov	Dec	Year
Mean daily maximum °C (°F)	33.2 (91.8)	33.6 (92.5)	32.9 (91.2)	31.4 (88.5)	31.1 (88.0)	30.4 (86.7)	30.2 (86.4)	30.8 (87.4)	31.6 (88.9)	31.9 (89.4)	31.8 (89.2)	32.1 (89.8)	31.7 (89.1)
Daily mean °C (°F)	26.6 (79.9)	27.0 (80.6)	26.7 (80.1)	26.1 (79.0)	25.8 (78.4)	25.2 (77.4)	24.9 (76.8)	25.3 (77.5)	25.7 (78.3)	26.0 (78.8)	25.9 (78.6)	26.3 (79.3)	25.9 (78.6)
Mean daily minimum °C (°F)	20.6 (69.1)	20.9 (69.6)	21.7 (71.1)	22.1 (71.8)	22.1 (71.8)	21.6 (70.9)	21.3 (70.3)	21.4 (70.5)	21.6 (70.9)	21.8 (71.2)	21.9 (71.4)	21.4 (70.5)	21.5 (70.7)
Average precipitation mm (inches)	22.5 (0.89)	78.8 (3.10)	193.7 (7.63)	349.1 (13.74)	411.1 (16.19)	408.4 (16.08)	296.4 (11.67)	247.7 (9.75)	225.1 (8.86)	246.8 (9.72)	199.1 (7.84)	79.1 (3.11)	2,756.6 (108.53)
Average precipitation days	4	6	12	19	21	22	20	17	15	16	14	8	173
Average relative humidity (%)	75	75	77	81	82	84	84	83	82	80	80	78	80
Mean monthly sunshine hours	198.4	158.1	117.8	99.0	108.5	93.0	105.4	124.0	141.0	145.7	141.0	176.7	1,608.6
Mean daily sunshine hours	6.4	5.6	3.8	3.3	3.5	3.1	3.4	4.0	4.7	4.7	4.7	5.7	4.4
Source: Instituto de Hidrologia Meteorologia y Estudios Ambientales
