= San Juan de Arama =

- Municipality and town
- Flag

- Location of the municipality and town of San Juan de Arama in the Meta Department of Colombia.
- Coordinates: 3°22′25″N 73°52′36″W
- Country: Colombia
- Department: Meta Department

Area
  - Total: 1,163 km^{2} (449 sq mi)
- Elevation: 510 m (1,670 ft)
- Time zone: UTC-5 (Colombia Standard Time)
- Climate: Am

San Juan de Arama is a town and municipality in the Meta Department, Colombia.
