= Víctor Julio Suárez Rojas =

Colombian guerrilla commander

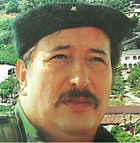
- Born: Víctor Julio Suárez Rojas; 2 January 1953; Icononzo, Tolima, Colombia
- Died: 22 September 2010 (aged 57); La Macarena, Meta, Colombia
- Military career
- Allegiance: FARC
- Rank: Secretariat member, Bloc commander
- Nicknames: "Mono Jojoy" "Jorge Briceño Suárez"
- Commands: Eastern Bloc
- Conflicts: Colombian armed conflict

Víctor Julio Suárez Rojas (2 January 1953 – 22 September 2010)—a.k.a. Jorge Briceño Suárez a.k.a. Mono Jojoy—was a high-ranking member of the Revolutionary Armed Forces of Colombia (FARC), a Colombian guerrilla organization. He was second-in-command to Alfonso Cano and top military commander. Suárez Rojas commanded the Eastern Bloc of the FARC and was a member of the FARC Secretariat. His nom de guerre was Jorge Briceño Suárez; to the Colombian army he was known as Mono Jojoy (mono is the word for monkey in Spanish, but it also means cute/pretty in Spain, and blond in Colombia).

== Biography ==
Suárez Rojas was born in Cabrera, Cundinamarca and joined the FARC in 1975 at age 22. He grew up without a father and received little education.

Suárez Rojas was one of the most important Colombian guerrilla leaders. The U.S. Attorney General requested his extradition if he were to have been captured.

Suárez Rojas was under indictment in the United States for killing three US citizens, terrorism and narcotics trafficking activities. The Colombian government also indicted Suárez Rojas on charges of rebellion, narcotrafficking, terrorism, kidnapping and extortion, among other crimes. He was indicted by the United States in 2002 for killing three US citizens in 1999. He was also accused of participating in the kidnapping of three US contractors. A proof of life video of the three released by the FARC in 2003 showed Mono Jojoy telling them that they were "prisoners . . . in the power of the FARC," and that the governments of Colombia and the United States have "abandoned and forgotten you." The three were rescued in July 2008.

=== Alleged assassination plot ===
On 11 May 2008 a Colombian military commander told the press several rogue bodyguards of "Mono Jojoy" had been plotting to murder the FARC commander to collect the US$5 million reward on his head. Three bodyguards were executed after "Mono Jojoy" found out about the plot, and another three of them are known to have escaped. One turned himself in to the authorities.

=== Chase ===
On 24 May 2008 the Colombian President Álvaro Uribe announced national forces were pursuing him: "The man called 'Mono Jojoy'--we are after him. He is the picture of health: fat, puffy, wrinkle-free, smartly dressed. But the heroic soldiers and policemen of this country are on to him. Generals, soldiers, policemen of the fatherland: let's get this man on a diet. Make him feed on roots so that this country may rid itself of this 40 year-old headache."

=== Operation Sodoma ===
Colombian authorities announced the death of Mono Jojoy on 23 September 2010. According to President Juan Manuel Santos the FARC commander was killed in an operation that began in the early hours of 21 September in the department of Meta, 190 km south of the capital Bogotá.

According to the GPS device of one of the soldiers who took part in the military operation, the location of the FARC camp where Mono Jojoy was killed is N02° 48' 14.0", W073° 58'19.4", as can be seen in the minute 02:54 of the Colombian army video released by Noticias Uno. The United States government refused to pay the reward to the informant.

== Aftermath ==
On 21 September 2010, experts in Colombia tried to crack the codes to 15 computers and almost 100 USB memory sticks belonging to Colombia's largest rebel group. One of the laptops is believed to have belonged to its military leader, Mono Jojoy, who was killed in the attack. Its screen was reportedly shattered by bullets, but its hard drive was still intact. The computers were examined by 40 experts from the police criminal investigation unit in the capital, Bogota. About 10,000 extra police officers were deployed to Colombia's main cities to prevent retaliatory attacks by the Farc. In the FARC's first public statement since the death of military leader "Mono Jojoy," the guerrilla group says it is "calling for a chance at peace, not for surrender," reports EFE.

=== Santos approval ratings and reaction ===
The urban approval rating of Colombian President Juan Manuel Santos increased to 88% following the military operation that killed 'Mono Jojoy". Colombian President Juan Manuel Santos compared the death of FARC leader "Mono Jojoy" to killing Osama bin Laden, and announced that the army found fourteen computers and 60 USB flash drives in the camp where the guerrilla was killed. On 24 September 2010, US President Obama praised the killing.

=== Vida y muerte del Mono Jojoy ===
In November 2010, El Tiempo reporter Jineth Bedoya Lima released her book Vida y muerte del Mono Jojoy (English: "Life and Death of Mono Jojoy"). The book alleged that Mono Jojoy had ordered the assassination -never carried out- of Caracol Radio journalist Néstor Morales. In response, the FARC-aligned news agency Noticias Nueva Colombia posted a headline on its website accusing her of being a military intelligence agent, causing the Colombian-based Foundation for Press Freedom and Canadian Journalists for Free Expression to issue statements of concern for her safety.

== Popular culture ==
In TV series Tres Caínes is portrayed by Alberto Pujol as the character of Comandante Briñez 'Morrocoy' y por el también actor Juan Pablo Franco en la serie Comando Élite del canal RCN.
