= Mesetas =

Coordinates: 3.37806°N 74.0447°W

- Municipality and town
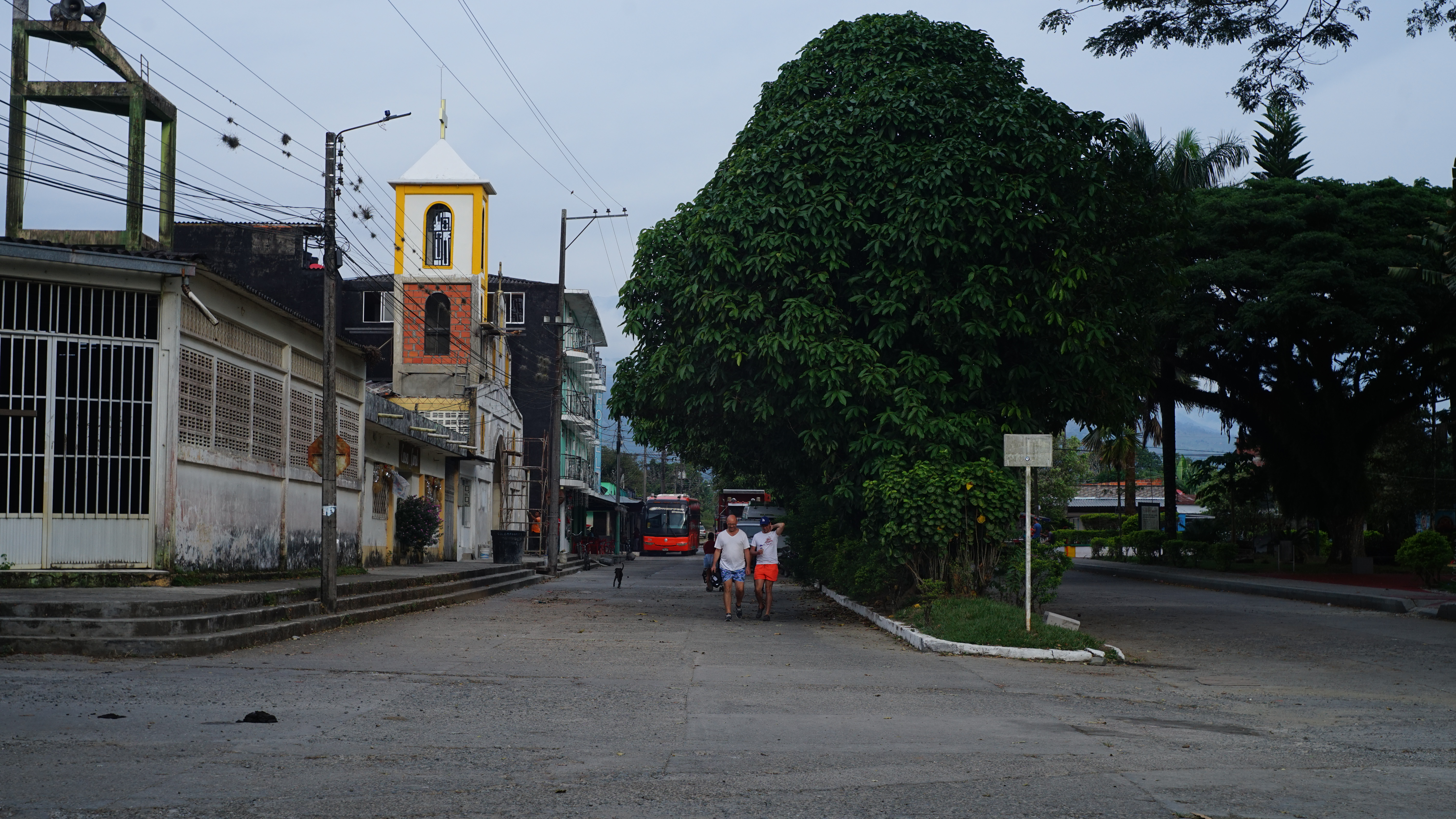
- Calle 9 in Mesetas Colombia

- Flag

- Location of the municipality and town of Mesetas in the Meta Department of Colombia.
- Country: Colombia
- Department: Meta Department

Area
  - Total: 1,980 km^{2} (760 sq mi)
- Elevation: 827 m (2,713 ft)

Population (Census 2018)
  - Total: 9,751
  - Density: 4.92/km^{2} (12.8/sq mi)
- Time zone: UTC-5 (Colombia Standard Time)
- Climate: Am

Mesetas is a town and municipality in the Meta Department, Colombia.

== Climate ==
Mesetas has a tropical rainforest climate (Köppen: Af). The period from March to November is very rainy, while December through February sees somewhat drier weather.

Climate data for Mesetas, elevation 620 m (2,030 ft), (1981–2010)
Month	Jan	Feb	Mar	Apr	May	Jun	Jul	Aug	Sep	Oct	Nov	Dec	Year
Mean daily maximum °C (°F)	30.1 (86.2)	30.7 (87.3)	30.0 (86.0)	29.1 (84.4)	28.5 (83.3)	27.7 (81.9)	27.4 (81.3)	28.4 (83.1)	29.1 (84.4)	29.2 (84.6)	29.0 (84.2)	29.6 (85.3)	29.1 (84.4)
Daily mean °C (°F)	25.3 (77.5)	25.5 (77.9)	25.2 (77.4)	24.5 (76.1)	24.1 (75.4)	23.6 (74.5)	23.2 (73.8)	23.6 (74.5)	24.2 (75.6)	24.5 (76.1)	24.6 (76.3)	24.9 (76.8)	24.4 (75.9)
Mean daily minimum °C (°F)	18.4 (65.1)	18.6 (65.5)	19.3 (66.7)	19.8 (67.6)	19.9 (67.8)	19.5 (67.1)	19.1 (66.4)	19.1 (66.4)	19.2 (66.6)	19.5 (67.1)	19.8 (67.6)	19.3 (66.7)	19.3 (66.7)
Average precipitation mm (inches)	60.4 (2.38)	100.4 (3.95)	170.8 (6.72)	357.5 (14.07)	386.7 (15.22)	402.7 (15.85)	354.0 (13.94)	297.9 (11.73)	285.5 (11.24)	281.7 (11.09)	208.9 (8.22)	90.5 (3.56)	2,932.4 (115.45)
Average precipitation days	7	8	13	21	24	25	24	22	20	20	17	10	206
Average relative humidity (%)	77	76	79	85	86	88	88	86	85	85	85	81	84
Mean monthly sunshine hours	179.8	141.2	108.5	105.0	114.7	108.0	111.6	124.0	141.0	145.7	147.0	173.6	1,600.1
Mean daily sunshine hours	5.8	5.0	3.5	3.5	3.7	3.6	3.6	4.0	4.7	4.7	4.9	5.6	4.4
Source: Instituto de Hidrologia Meteorologia y Estudios Ambientales
