= La Macarena, Meta =

Coordinates: 2°10′58″N 73°47′5″W

- Municipality and town
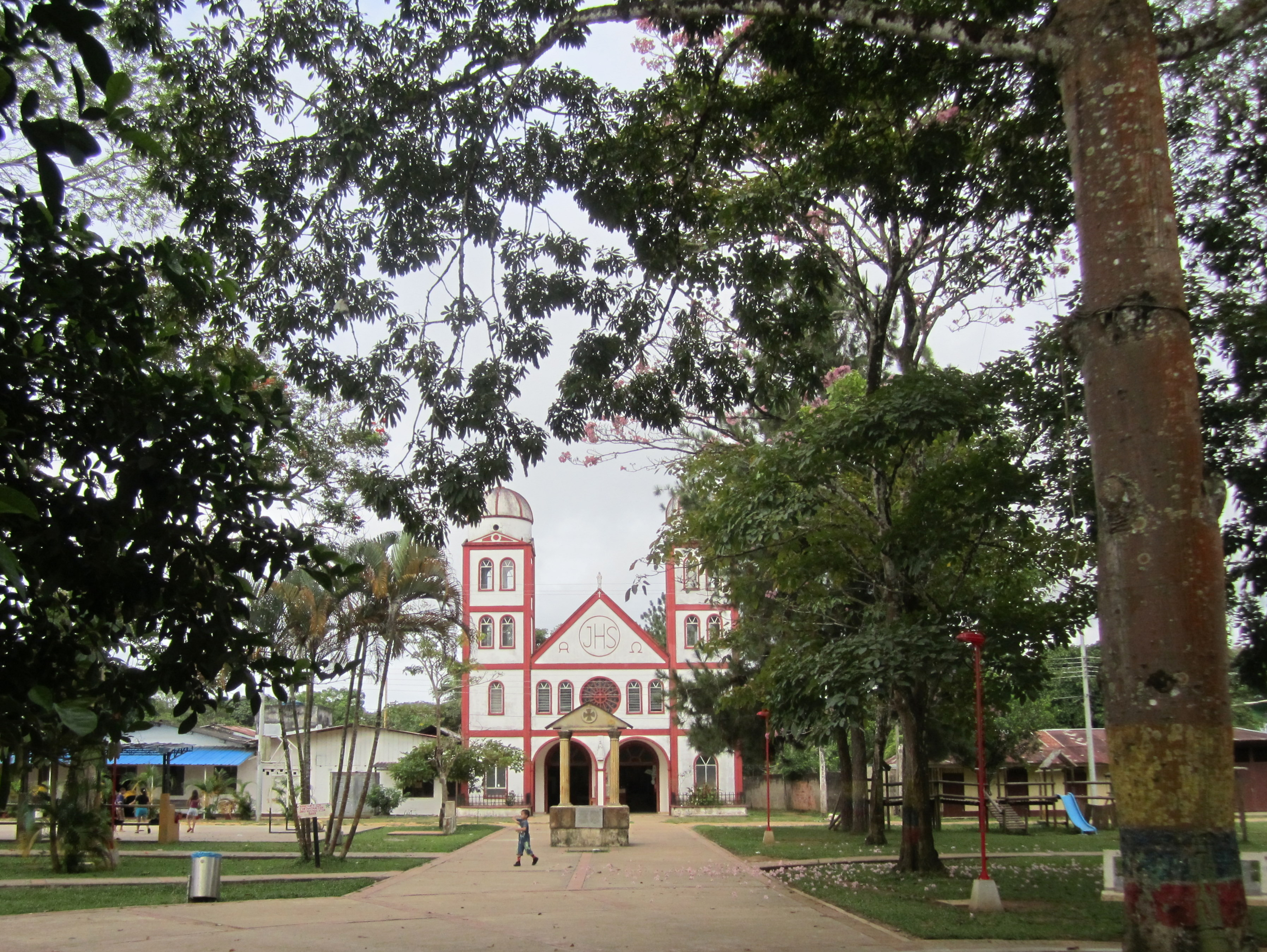

- Flag

- Location of the municipality and town of La Macarena, Meta in the Meta Department of Colombia.
- Country: Colombia
- Department: Meta Department
- Founded: November 1954

Government
  - Mayor: Cesar Augusto Sanchez

Area
  - Municipality and town: 11,229 km^{2} (4,336 sq mi)
- Elevation: 233 m (764 ft)

Population (2015)
  - Municipality and town: 32,861
  - Urban: 4,458
- Time zone: UTC-5 (Colombia Standard Time)
- Climate: Am

La Macarena is a town and municipality in the Meta Department, located about 280 km (170 m) south of Bogotá, Colombia.

The town was included in the former El Caguan DMZ. Now, back in the control of Colombian Army and Police Force, the town is a growing ecotourism destination, particularly for the five coloured river Caño Cristales considered one of the most beautiful in the world. La Macarena is served by La Macarena Airport.

== Unidentified corpses and allegations of a mass grave ==
In January 2010, El Nuevo Herald reported that local villagers had announced the discovery of a mass grave allegedly containing almost 2,000 unidentified corpses in the La Macarena cemetery, apparently containing bodies that had been taken there by the Colombian Army and presented as guerrilla combat casualties. Villagers interviewed by the newspaper suspected that relatives who had previously disappeared during the last few years would have been buried at the site and denied that they were guerrillas. Colombian officials and prosecutors called for further inquiries into the matter. The Inspector General sent investigators into the area and the Attorney General's Office announced an additional probe.

In August 2010, Tribune Magazine reported that an international delegation made up of politicians, lawyers and labor unionists led by the UK-based Justice for Colombia NGO visited the site to take part in a public hearing. According to Justice for Colombia, locals provided reports and evidence of extrajudicial killings by the Colombian military. Colombian President Álvaro Uribe rejected the delegation's presence and accused its members of slandering the Colombian Army.

In September 2010, the Office of the United Nations High Commissioner for Human Rights visited the La Macarena site and confirmed 446 unidentified bodies that had been reported as guerrillas killed in combat since 2002 were buried in a graveyard but did not find signs of a mass grave nor of any clandestine burials. A report by UN officials called for the identification of the bodies and confirming whether or not human rights violations had been committed. The Office of the High Commissioner for Human Rights expressed its concerns "about the lack of effective controls and adequate records regarding reports of people killed in combat, which raises questions about the circumstances surrounding their deaths." The Colombian Defense Ministry acknowledged the UN's findings and stated that it would support any subsequent investigations.

== Climate ==
Climate data for La Macarena (Macarena La), elevation 350 m (1,150 ft), (1981–2010)
Month	Jan	Feb	Mar	Apr	May	Jun	Jul	Aug	Sep	Oct	Nov	Dec	Year
Mean daily maximum °C (°F)	32.3 (90.1)	32.7 (90.9)	31.9 (89.4)	30.7 (87.3)	30.3 (86.5)	29.3 (84.7)	29.1 (84.4)	30.0 (86.0)	30.7 (87.3)	31.1 (88.0)	31.0 (87.8)	31.3 (88.3)	30.9 (87.6)
Daily mean °C (°F)	26.8 (80.2)	26.7 (80.1)	26.4 (79.5)	25.6 (78.1)	25.3 (77.5)	24.5 (76.1)	24.2 (75.6)	24.8 (76.6)	25.3 (77.5)	25.5 (77.9)	25.9 (78.6)	26.2 (79.2)	25.6 (78.1)
Mean daily minimum °C (°F)	21.9 (71.4)	21.7 (71.1)	22.2 (72.0)	22.2 (72.0)	22.0 (71.6)	21.6 (70.9)	21.1 (70.0)	21.3 (70.3)	21.5 (70.7)	21.9 (71.4)	22.3 (72.1)	22.2 (72.0)	21.8 (71.2)
Average precipitation mm (inches)	43.5 (1.71)	92.0 (3.62)	175.7 (6.92)	319.3 (12.57)	321.5 (12.66)	358.9 (14.13)	315.5 (12.42)	239.7 (9.44)	236.3 (9.30)	198.3 (7.81)	151.7 (5.97)	89.3 (3.52)	2,504.9 (98.62)
Average precipitation days	5	8	14	19	21	23	21	20	16	17	14	9	179
Average relative humidity (%)	78	77	82	87	88	90	90	88	87	86	86	82	86
Mean monthly sunshine hours	223.2	160.9	139.5	108.0	114.7	99.0	114.7	136.4	147.0	158.1	162.0	198.4	1,761.9
Mean daily sunshine hours	7.2	5.7	4.5	3.6	3.7	3.3	3.7	4.4	4.9	5.1	5.4	6.4	4.8
Source: Instituto de Hidrologia Meteorologia y Estudios Ambientales

Climate data for La Macarena (Balsora La), elevation 372 m (1,220 ft), (1981–2010)
Month	Jan	Feb	Mar	Apr	May	Jun	Jul	Aug	Sep	Oct	Nov	Dec	Year
Mean daily maximum °C (°F)	32.5 (90.5)	33.1 (91.6)	31.4 (88.5)	30.0 (86.0)	29.4 (84.9)	28.9 (84.0)	28.9 (84.0)	29.7 (85.5)	30.5 (86.9)	31.0 (87.8)	31.1 (88.0)	31.2 (88.2)	30.5 (86.9)
Daily mean °C (°F)	26.2 (79.2)	26.4 (79.5)	25.8 (78.4)	25.3 (77.5)	24.7 (76.5)	24.1 (75.4)	23.8 (74.8)	24.3 (75.7)	24.8 (76.6)	25.2 (77.4)	25.6 (78.1)	26.2 (79.2)	25.2 (77.4)
Mean daily minimum °C (°F)	20.2 (68.4)	20.7 (69.3)	21.1 (70.0)	21.3 (70.3)	21.0 (69.8)	20.7 (69.3)	20.1 (68.2)	20.2 (68.4)	20.5 (68.9)	20.9 (69.6)	21.4 (70.5)	21.3 (70.3)	20.7 (69.3)
Average precipitation mm (inches)	28.9 (1.14)	90.8 (3.57)	187.0 (7.36)	331.0 (13.03)	339.3 (13.36)	387.8 (15.27)	320.6 (12.62)	227.6 (8.96)	264.0 (10.39)	236.4 (9.31)	169.1 (6.66)	67.5 (2.66)	2,551.1 (100.44)
Average precipitation days	4	8	14	20	22	24	23	21	20	17	15	7	188
Average relative humidity (%)	78	78	84	90	91	91	90	89	88	87	86	80	87
Mean monthly sunshine hours	192.2	141.2	99.2	78.0	80.6	69.0	80.6	96.1	102.0	117.8	129.0	145.7	1,331.4
Mean daily sunshine hours	6.2	5.0	3.2	2.6	2.6	2.3	2.6	3.1	3.4	3.8	4.3	4.7	3.7
Source: Instituto de Hidrologia Meteorologia y Estudios Ambientales
