= Thomas Hargrove =

Kidnapped American agricultural scientist (1944–2011)

- Born: Thomas Rex Hargrove; 3 March 1944
- Died: 22 January 2011 (aged 66)

Thomas Rex Hargrove (3 March 1944 – 22 January 2011) was an American agricultural scientist and journalist who was kidnapped in Colombia by FARC narco-guerillas in 1994. Throughout the 11 months he was captive, Hargrove secretly kept a diary, which was published as Long March To Freedom: Tom Hargrove's Own Story of His Kidnapping by Colombian Narco-Guerrillas. The 2000 film Proof of Life starring Meg Ryan and Russell Crowe was heavily based on Hargrove and his ordeal.

== Education and career ==
Hargrove obtained a double degree in agricultural science and journalism from Texas A&M University in 1966. He later earned a Ph.D. from Iowa State University.

During the Vietnam War, he served as an officer in the United States Army and worked for the Military Assistance Command, introducing the high-yield IR8 rice cultivar in Chương Thiện. Hargrove subsequently learned that the Viet Cong had targeted him, but decided to let him live because of the good he was doing.

After his military service, he became a writer and editor at the International Rice Research Institute.

== Kidnapping ==
In 1991, Hargrove began working for the International Center for Tropical Agriculture (CIAT) in Cali, Colombia. While driving to work on 23 September 1994, he encountered a roadblock set up by FARC guerrillas who kidnapped him at gunpoint. Hargrove was considered a high-value prisoner because the semi-literate guerrillas thought his CIAT identification badge was proof that he was working for the CIA.

Hargrove was held captive by FARC-associated guerrillas in several different primitive campsites in the Colombian Andes for a total of 11 months. During this time, he secretly kept a detailed diary on checkbooks and other scraps of paper he either had on him at the time of his kidnapping or that he scavenged. Mainly being illiterate and uneducated youths from farming backgrounds, his captors either did not comprehend or ignored the implications of Hargrove's meticulous documentation of his experience.

FARC's reluctance to admit that Hargrove was not a CIA operative, combined with the difficulties communicating with the various FARC factions, made negotiating his release difficult. Despite being illegal in Colombia, his family paid two separate ransoms, which eventually resulted in his release. Hargrove's captors gave him 10,000 Colombian Pesos ($USD12) and marched him two days before releasing him in or near Los Nevados National Natural Park at 10:47am, August 22, 1995. Hargrove walked for several more hours before encountering a park ranger, who walked him over a mountain range to a village where he was surprised to learn that people knew his name and of his kidnapping. The villagers drove him back to his house in Cali, where he waited for his family and surprised them upon their return.

Hargrove compiled his notes and published them as Long March To Freedom in 2001. The book contains a transcription of his notes (where legible) as well as scanned copies of some pages and his "proof of life" ransom Polaroid. The book served as the premise for the Taylor Hackford movie Proof of Life, in which David Morse played the Hargrove-inspired character.

== Post-kidnapping ==
Following his release and return to the US, Hargrove became a kidnapping and anti-terrorism consultant. He conducted training courses at the U.S. Joint Special Operations University and the USAF Special Operations School, where he held the title of adjunct professor of Dynamics of International Terrorism. He was also awarded the academic title of Senior Fellow for Terrorism Analysis, and when on assignment, held the protocol rank of 07: Brigadier General (one star). Hargrove also testified before the U.S. House of Representatives Committee on International Relations on kidnappings, drugs, and Colombian narco-guerrillas.

== Publications ==
- Hargrove, Thomas R. (1991). The Mysteries of Taal: A Philippine Volcano and Lake, Her Sea Life and Lost Towns. Manila: Bookmark Pub. ISBN 971569019X.
- Hargrove, Thomas R. (1994). A Dragon Lives Forever: War and Rice in Vietnam's Mekong Delta, 1969-1991, and Beyond. New York: Ivy Books. ISBN 080410672X.
- Hargrove, Thomas R. (2001). Long March To Freedom: Tom Hargrove's Own Story of His Kidnapping by Colombian Narco-Guerrillas. 1st Books Library. ISBN 0-7596-0518-1.

== Death ==
Hargrove died of heart failure in Galveston, Texas, on 22 January 2011. Ten years later, his son, Miles Hargrove, would release a documentary about the kidnapping, Miracle Fishing.

== See also ==
- List of kidnappings
- Lists of solved missing person cases
