= Revolutionary Armed Forces of Colombia =

Former Colombian guerrilla movement

Revolutionary Armed Forces of Colombia – People's Army
- Fuerzas Armadas Revolucionarias de Colombia – Ejército del Pueblo
- Leaders: Timochenko; Iván Márquez; Joaquín Gómez; Pablo Catatumbo; Mauricio Jaramillo; Alfonso Cano ^{†}; Manuel Marulanda ^{†}; Jacobo Arenas ^{†}; Efraín Guzmán ^{†}; Raúl Reyes ^{†}; Iván Ríos ^{†}; Mono Jojoy ^{†}
- Dates active: 27 May 1964 – 27 June 2017 (53 years, 31 days); Small numbers of FARC dissidents still active
- Headquarters: Casa Verde (1965–1990); Los Pozos
- Active regions: Concentrated in north-western, south-western, southern, and eastern Colombia.; Incursions into Peru, Venezuela, Brazil, Panama, and Ecuador.; Sporadic presence in other Latin American countries, predominantly Mexico, Paraguay and Bolivia.
- Ideology: Communism; Marxism–Leninism; Guevarism; Foquismo; Bolivarianism; Left-wing nationalism; Revolutionary socialism
- Political position: Far-left
- Size: 7,000–10,000 (2013)
- Part of: Simón Bolívar Guerrilla Coordinating Board
- Wars: the Colombian conflict

The Revolutionary Armed Forces of Colombia – People's Army (Spanish: Fuerzas Armadas Revolucionarias de Colombia – Ejército del Pueblo, FARC–EP or FARC) was a far-left Marxist–Leninist guerrilla group involved in the continuing Colombian conflict starting in 1964. The FARC–EP was officially founded in 1966 from peasant self-defense groups formed from 1948 during La Violencia as a peasant force promoting a political line of agrarianism and anti-imperialism. They were known to employ a variety of military tactics, in addition to more unconventional methods, including terrorism.

The operations of the FARC–EP were funded by kidnap and ransom, mining, extortion, and taxation of various forms of economic activity, and the production and distribution of drugs. They are only one actor in a complex conflict where atrocities have been committed by the state, right-wing paramilitaries, and left-wing guerrillas not limited to FARC, such as ELN, M-19, and others. Colombia's National Centre for Historical Memory, a government agency, has estimated that between 1981 and 2012 paramilitary groups have caused 38.4% of the civilian deaths, while the Guerillas are responsible for 16.8%, the Colombian Security Forces for 10.1%, and other non-identified armed groups for 27.7%. The National Centre for Historical Memory has also concluded that of the 27,023 kidnappings carried out between 1970 and 2010, the Guerillas were responsible for 90.6% of them.

The strength of the FARC–EP forces was high; in 2007, the FARC said they were an armed force of 18,000 men and women; in 2010, the Colombian military calculated that FARC forces consisted of about 13,800 members, 50 percent of whom were armed guerrilla combatants; and in 2011 the president of Colombia, Juan Manuel Santos, said that FARC–EP forces comprised fewer than 10,000 members. The Colombian Ministry of Defense reported 19,504 deserters, or individually demobilized members, from the FARC between August 2002 and their collective demobilization in 2017, despite potentially severe punishment, including execution, for attempted desertion in the FARC.

FARC made 239 attacks on the energy infrastructure; however, they showed signs of fatigue. By 2014, the FARC were not seeking to engage in outright combat with the army, instead concentrating on small-scale ambushes against isolated army units. Meanwhile, from 2008 to 2017, the FARC opted to attack police patrols with home-made mortars, sniper rifles, and explosives, as they were not considered strong enough to engage police units directly. This followed the trend of the 1990s during the strengthening of Colombian government forces.

In June 2016, the FARC signed a ceasefire accord with President Santos in Havana. This accord was seen as an historic step to ending the war that has gone on for fifty years. Santos announced that four years of negotiation had secured a peace deal with FARC and that a national referendum to ratify the deal would take place on 2 October. The referendum failed with 50.24% voting against. In November 2016, the Colombian government and the FARC signed a revised peace deal, which was approved by Congress.

On 27 June 2017, FARC ceased to be an armed group, disarming itself and handing over its weapons to the United Nations. A month later, FARC announced its reformation as a legal political party, later renamed the Commons, in accordance with the terms of the peace deal. However, about 2,000 to 2,500 FARC dissidents still take on FARC's original doctrine and continue with drug trafficking, though far smaller than the group at its peak.

A small faction of FARC leaders announced a return to armed activity on 29 August 2019, stating that the Colombian government did not respect peace agreements, a position Colombian officials disagreed with. The Colombian government responded with preemptive strikes, killing FARC members planning to lead rearmament activities. In October 2023, the Colombian government engaged in peace talks with the FARC splinter group and agreed to a ceasefire. In January, both sides agreed to extend the ceasefire to June 2024.

As of February 2024, the vast majority of former FARC members have honored the 2016 peace agreement. However, in August 2024 the government announced an end to a ceasefire with the smaller dissident FARC faction the Estado Mayor Central, EMC, who reject the 2016 peace deal. In October 2024, the EMC agreed to a new ceasefire with the government.

== Background ==
=== La Violencia and the National Front ===
"There is more repression of individual freedom here, than in any country we've been to; the police patrol the streets, carrying rifles, and demand your papers every few minutes ... the atmosphere, here, is tense, and it seems a revolution may be brewing. The countryside is in open revolt, and the army is powerless to suppress it."

— Diary of Ernesto "Che" Guevara, 6 July 1952

In 1948, in the aftermath of the assassination of the populist politician Jorge Eliécer Gaitán, a decade of large-scale political violence erupted throughout Colombia. This unrest eventually culminated in a Conservative–Liberal civil war, killing more than 200,000 people. In Colombian history and culture, the killings are known as La Violencia (The Violence, 1948–58); most of the people killed were peasants and laborers in rural Colombia. In 1957–1958, the political leadership of the Liberal Party and the Conservative Party agreed to establish a bipartisan political system known as the National Front (Frente Nacional, 1958–74). The Liberal and the Conservative parties agreed to alternate in the exercise of government power by presenting a joint National Front candidate to each election and restricting the participation of other political movements.

The pact was ratified as a constitutional amendment by a national plebiscite on 1 December 1957 and was supported by the Church as well as Colombia's business leaders. The initial power-sharing agreement was effective until 1974; nonetheless, with modifications, the Liberal–Conservative bipartisan system lasted until 1990. The 16-year extension of the bipartisan power-sharing agreement permitted the Liberal and Conservative elites to consolidate their socioeconomic control of Colombian society, and to strengthen the military to suppress political reform and radical politics proposing alternative forms of government for Colombia.

=== Accelerated Economic Development ===
During the 1960s, the Colombian government effected a policy of Accelerated Economic Development (AED), the agribusiness plan of Lauchlin Currie, a Canadian-born U.S. economist who owned ranching land in Colombia. The plan promoted industrial farming that would produce great yields of agricultural and animal products for worldwide exportation, while the Colombian government would provide subsidies to large-scale private farms. The AED policy came at the expense of the small-scale family farms that only yielded food supplies for local consumption. Based on a legalistic interpretation of what constituted "efficient use" of the land, thousands of peasants were forcefully evicted from their farms and migrated to the cities, where they became part of the industrial labor pool. In 1961, the dispossession of farmland had produced 40,000 landless families and by 1969 their numbers amounted to 400,000 throughout Colombia. By 1970, the latifundio type of industrial farm (more than 50 hectares) occupied more than 77 per cent of arable land in the country. The AED policy increased the concentration of land ownership among cattle ranchers and urban industrialists, whose businesses expanded their profits as a result of reductions in the cost of labor wages after the influx of thousands of displaced peasants into the cities. During this period, most rural workers lacked basic medical care and malnutrition was almost universal, which increased the rates of preventable disease and infant mortality.

== History ==
=== PCC and self-defense communities ===
Communists were active throughout rural and urban Colombia in the period immediately following World War I. The Colombian Communist Party (Partido Comunista Colombiano, PCC) was formally accredited by the Comintern in 1930. The PCC began establishing "peasant leagues" in rural areas and "popular fronts" in urban areas, calling for improved living and working conditions, education, and rights for the working class. These groups began networking together to present a defensive front against the state-supported violence of large landholders. Members organized strikes, protests, seizures of land, and organized communist-controlled "self-defense communities" in southern Colombia that were able to resist state military forces, while providing for the subsistence needs of the populace. Many of the PCC's attempts at organizing peasants were met with violent repression by the Colombian government and the landowning class. U.S. military intelligence estimated that in 1962, the size of the PCC had grown to 8,000 to 10,000 active members, and an additional 28,000 supporters.

In 1961, a guerrilla leader and long-time PCC organizer named Manuel Marulanda Vélez declared an independent "Republic of Marquetalia". The Lleras government attempted unsuccessfully to attack the communities to drive out the guerrillas, due to fears that "a Cuban-style revolutionary situation might develop". After the failed attacks, several army outposts were set up in the area.

In October 1959, the United States sent a "Special Survey Team" composed of counterinsurgency experts to investigate Colombia's internal security situation. Among other policy recommendations the U.S. team advised that "to shield the interests of both Colombian and US authorities against 'interventionist' charges any special aid given for internal security was to be sterile and covert in nature". In February 1962, three years after the 1959 "US Special Survey Team", a Fort Bragg top-level U.S. Special Warfare team headed by Special Warfare Center commander General William P. Yarborough, visited Colombia for a second survey.

In a secret supplement to his report to the Joint Chiefs of Staff, Yarborough encouraged the creation and deployment of a US-backed force to commit "paramilitary, sabotage and/or terrorist activities against known communist proponents".

The new counter-insurgency policy was instituted as Plan Lazo in 1962 and called for both military operations and civic action programs in violent areas. Following Yarborough's recommendations, the Colombian military recruited civilians into "civil defense" groups which worked alongside the military in its counter-insurgency campaign, as well as in civilian intelligence networks to gather information on guerrilla activity. Doug Stokes argues that it was not until the early part of the 1980s that the Colombian government attempted to move away from the counterinsurgency strategy represented by Plan Lazo and Yarborough's 1962 recommendations.

=== Creation of FARC ===
The Colombian government began attacking many of the communist groups in the early 1960s, attempting to re-assimilate the territories under the control of the national government. FARC was formed in 1964 by Manuel Marulanda Vélez and other PCC members, after a military attack on the community of Marquetalia. 16,000 Colombian troops attacked the community, which only had 48 armed fighters. Marulanda and 47 others fought against government forces at Marquetalia and then escaped into the mountains along with the other fighters. These 48 men formed the core of FARC, which later grew in size to hundreds of fighters.

=== Betancur and Barco presidencies (1982–1990) ===
==== Seventh Guerrilla Conference of the FARC–EP ====
In 1982, FARC–EP held its Seventh Guerrilla Conference, which called for a major shift in FARC's strategy. FARC had historically been doing most of its fighting in rural areas and was limited to small-scale confrontations with Colombian military forces. By 1982, increased income from the "coca boom" allowed them to expand into an irregular army, which would then stage large-scale attacks on Colombian troops. They also began sending fighters to Vietnam and the Soviet Union for advanced military training. They also planned to move closer to middle-sized cities, as opposed to only remote rural areas, and closer to areas rich in natural resources, in order to create a strong economic infrastructure. It was also at this conference that FARC added the initials "EP", for "Ejército del Pueblo" or "People's Army", to the organization's name.

==== La Uribe Agreement and Union Patriótica ====
In the early 1980s, President Belisario Betancur began discussing the possibility of peace talks with the guerrillas. This resulted in the 1984 La Uribe Agreement, which called for a cease-fire, which ended up lasting from 1984 to 1987.

In 1985, members of the FARC–EP, along with a large number of other leftist and communist groups, formed a political party known as the Union Patriótica ("Patriotic Union", UP). The UP sought political reforms (known as Apertura Democratica) such as constitutional reform, more democratic local elections, political decentralization, and ending the domination of Colombian politics by the Liberal and Conservative parties. They also pursued socioeconomic reforms such land redistribution, greater health and education spending, the nationalization of foreign businesses, Colombian banks, and transportation, and greater public access to mass media. While many members of the UP were involved with the FARC–EP, the large majority of them were not and came from a wide variety of backgrounds such as labor unions and socialist parties such as the PCC. In the cities, the FARC–EP began integrating itself with the UP and forming Juntas Patrióticas (or "solidarity cells")—small groups of people associated with labor unions, student activist groups, and peasant leagues, who traveled into the barrios discussing social problems, building support for the UP, and determining the sociopolitical stance of the urban peasantry.

The UP performed better in elections than any other leftist party in Colombia's history. In 1986, UP candidates won 350 local council seats, 23 deputy positions in departmental assemblies, 9 seats in the House, and 6 seats in the Senate. The 1986 presidential candidate, Jaime Pardo Leal, won 4.6% of the national vote.

Since 1986, thousands of members of the UP and other leftist parties were murdered (estimates range from 4,000 to 6,000). In 1987, the President of the UP, Jaime Pardo, was murdered. In 1989 a single large landholder had over 400 UP members murdered. Over 70% of all Colombian presidential candidates in 1990—and 100% of those from center-left parties—were assassinated.

=== Gaviria and Samper presidencies (1990–1998) ===
During this period, the Colombian government continued its negotiations with the FARC–EP and other armed groups, some of which were successful. Some of the groups which demobilized at this time include the EPL, the ERP, the Quintín Lame Armed Movement, and the M-19.

On 10 August 1990, senior leader Jacobo Arenas, an ideological leader and founder of FARC–EP, died of a heart attack at the Casa Verde compound in Colombia's eastern mountains.

Towards the end of 1990, the Colombian army, with no advance warning and while negotiations were still ongoing with the group, attacked and seized four linked bases. The last of these a compound known as Casa Verde, which housed the National Secretariat of the FARC–EP, was seized on 15 December 1990. The Colombian government argued that the attack was caused by the FARC–EP's lack of commitment to the process, demonstrated by continuing its criminal activities and FARC attacks in November.

On 3 June 1991, dialogue resumed between the Simón Bolívar Guerrilla Coordinating Board and the government on neutral territory in Caracas, Venezuela and Tlaxcala, Mexico. However, the war did not stop, and armed attacks by both sides continued. The negotiation process was broken off in 1993 after no agreement was reached. The Coordinating Board disappeared not long after that time, and guerrilla groups continued their activities independently.

Before the break off of dialogue, a letter written by a group of Colombian intellectuals (among whom were Nobel laureate Gabriel García Márquez) to the Simón Bolívar Guerrilla Coordinating Board was released denouncing the approach taken by the FARC–EP and the dire consequences that it was having for the country.

In the early 1990s, the FARC–EP had between 7,000 and 10,000 fighters, organized into 70 fronts spread throughout the country. From 1996 to 1998 they inflicted a series of strikes on the Colombian Army, including a three-day offensive in Mitú (Vaupés department), taking a large number of soldiers prisoner.

On 23 September 1994, the FARC kidnapped American agricultural scientist Thomas Hargrove and held him captive for 11 months. After his release, Hargrove wrote a book about his ordeal which inspired the 2000 film Proof of Life starring Meg Ryan and Russell Crowe.

Over this period in Colombia, the cultivation of different drugs expanded and there were widespread coca farmers' marches. These marches brought to a halt several major arteries in southern Colombia. Government officials said that FARC–EP had forced the protesters to participate. According to social anthropologist María Clemencia Ramírez, the relationship between the guerrillas and the marches was ambivalent: FARC–EP promoted the 1996 protests as part of their participatory democracy policies yet also exercised authoritarianism, which led to tensions and negotiations with peasant leaders, but the cocalero movement brought proposals on behalf of the coca growers and defended its own interests.

French sociologist Alain Labrousse, who has conducted extensive research on the illicit narcotics industry in Latin America and Central Asia, has noted similarities in the reliance on the drug trade by both the FARC–EP and the Taliban. In his thesis, Labrousse asserts that the FARC–EP leadership, like that of the Taliban, explicitly bans the use of drugs by its membership and within the local population, but vigorously advocates for legalization of drug trafficking as a tool to finance its military objectives. In both cases, the insurgency groups manage to garner significant political support of farmers who serve to benefit from the illicit drug trade, prompting grassroots mobilization, political activism, and agitation to demand legalization by the government.

=== Pastrana presidency (1998–2002) ===
In March 1999 members of a local FARC contingent killed three United States–based indigenous rights activists, who were working with the U'Wa people to build a school for U'Wa children, and were fighting against encroachment of U'Wa territory by multinational oil corporations. The killings were questioned by many and condemned by many others, and led the United States to increase pressure on the Pastrana administration to crack down on FARC guerrillas.

==== 1998–2002 peace process ====
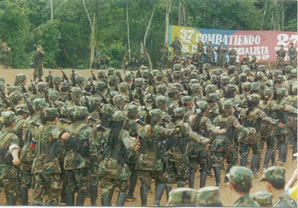
FARC guerrillas marching in formation during the Caguan peace talks (1998–2002)

With the hope of negotiating a peace settlement, on 7 November 1998, President Andrés Pastrana granted FARC–EP a 42,000 km^{2} (16,200 sq mi) safe haven meant to serve as a confidence building measure, centred on the San Vicente del Caguán settlement.

After a series of high-profile guerrilla actions, including the hijacking of an aircraft, the attack on several small towns and cities, the arrest of the Irish Colombia Three (see below) and the alleged training of FARC–EP militants in bomb making by them, and the kidnapping of several political figures, Pastrana ended the peace talks on 21 February 2002 and ordered the armed forces to start retaking the FARC–EP controlled zone, beginning at midnight. A 48-hour respite that had been previously agreed to with the rebel group was not respected as the government argued that it had already been granted during an earlier crisis in January, when most of the more prominent FARC–EP commanders had apparently left the demilitarized zone. Shortly after the end of talks, the FARC–EP kidnapped Oxygen Green Party presidential candidate Íngrid Betancourt, who was travelling in Colombian territory. Betancourt was rescued by the Colombian government on 2 July 2008 (see Operation Jaque below).

==== The Colombia Three case ====
On 24 April 2002, the U.S. House of Representatives Committee on International Relations published the findings of its investigation into IRA activities in Colombia. Their report alleged a longstanding connection between the IRA and FARC–EP, mentioned at least 15 IRA members who had been travelling in and out of Colombia since 1998, and estimated that the IRA had received at least $2 million in drug proceeds for training FARC–EP members. The IRA/FARC–EP connection was first made public on 11 August 2001, following the arrest in Bogotá of two IRA explosives and urban warfare experts and of a representative of Sinn Féin who was known to be stationed in Cuba. Jim Monaghan, Martin McCauley and Niall Connolly (known as the Colombia Three), were arrested in Colombia in August 2001 and were accused of teaching bomb-making methods to FARC–EP.

On 15 February 2002, the Colombia Three were charged with training FARC–EP members in bomb-making in Colombia. The Colombian authorities had received satellite footage of the men with FARC–EP in an isolated jungle area, where they were thought to have spent five weeks. They could have spent up to 20 years in gaol if the allegations were proved.

During October 2001, a key witness in the case against the three Irish republicans disappeared. This came as Sinn Féin President Gerry Adams admitted one of the men was the party's representative in Cuba. The missing witness, a former police inspector, said he had seen Mr McCauley with FARC–EP members in 1998. Without his testimony, legal sources said the chances of convicting the three men were reduced.

They were eventually found guilty of travelling on false passports in June 2004 but were acquitted of training FARC–EP members. That decision was reversed after an appeal by the Attorney General of Colombia and they were sentenced to 17-year terms. However, they vanished in December 2004 while on bail and returned to Ireland. Tánaiste Mary Harney said no deal had been done with Sinn Féin or the IRA over the three's return to Ireland adding that the Irish government would consider any request from the Colombian authorities for their extradition. Colombian vice-president Francisco Santos Calderón did not rule out allowing them to serve their sentences in Ireland.

=== Uribe presidency (2002–2010) ===
==== 2002–2007 ====
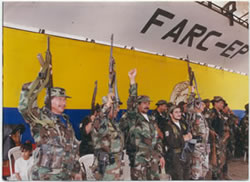
FARC commanders during the Caguan peace talks (1998–2002)

For most of the period between 2002 and 2005, the FARC–EP was in a strategic withdrawal due to the increasing military and police actions of new president Álvaro Uribe, which led to the capture or desertion of many fighters and medium-level commanders. Uribe ran for office on an anti-FARC–EP platform and was determined to defeat FARC–EP in a bid to create "confidence" in the country. Uribe's own father had been killed by FARC–EP in an attempted kidnapping in 1983.

In 2002 and 2003, FARC broke up 10 large ranches in Meta, an eastern Colombian province, and distributed the land to local subsistence farmers.

During the first two years of the Uribe administration, several FARC–EP fronts, most notably in Cundinamarca and Antioquia, were broken by the government's military operations.

On 5 May 2003, the FARC assassinated the governor of Antioquia, Guillermo Gaviria Correa, his advisor for peace, former defence minister Gilberto Echeverri Mejía, and eight soldiers. The FARC had kidnapped Mr. Gaviria and Mr. Echeverri a year earlier, when the two men were leading a march for peace from Medellín to Caicedo in Antioquia.

On 13 July 2004, the office of the United Nations' High Commissioner for Human Rights publicly condemned the group, given evidence that FARC–EP violated article 17 of the additional Protocol II of the Geneva Convention and international humanitarian law, as a result of the 10 July massacre of seven peasants and the subsequent displacement of 80 individuals in San Carlos, Antioquia.

In early February 2005, a series of small-scale actions by the FARC–EP around the southwestern departments of Colombia, resulted in an estimated 40 casualties. The FARC–EP, in response to government military operations in the south and in the southeast, displaced its military centre of gravity towards the Nariño, Putumayo and Cauca departments.

The FARC–EP originally said that they would only release the police and military members they held captive (whom they considered to be prisoners of war) through exchanges with the government for imprisoned FARC–EP members. During the duration of the DMZ negotiations, a small humanitarian exchange took place.

The group demanded a demilitarized zone including two towns (Florida and Pradera) in the strategic region of Valle del Cauca, where much of the current military action against them has taken place. This region is also an important way of transporting drugs to the Pacific coast and was even the primary location for Norte del Valle Cartel and Cali Cartel. This demand was rejected by the Colombian government based on previous experience during the 2002 peace talks.

On 2 December 2004, the government announced the pardon of 23 FARC–EP prisoners, to encourage a reciprocal move. The prisoners to be released were all of low rank and had promised not to rejoin the armed struggle. In November 2004, the FARC–EP had rejected a proposal to hand over 59 of its captives in exchange for 50 guerrillas imprisoned by the government.

In a communique dated 28 November but released publicly on 3 December, the FARC–EP declared that they were no longer insisting on the demilitarization of San Vicente del Caguán and Cartagena del Chairá as a precondition for the negotiation of the prisoner exchange, but instead that of Florida and Pradera in the Valle department. They state that this area would lie outside the "area of influence" of both their Southern and Eastern Blocks (the FARC–EP's strongest) and that of the military operations being carried out by the Uribe administration.

They requested security guarantees both for the displacement of their negotiators and that of the guerrillas that would be freed, which were stated to number as many as 500 or more, and ask the Catholic Church to coordinate the participation of the United Nations and other countries in the process.

The FARC–EP also mention in the communique that Simón Trinidad's extradition, would be a serious obstacle to reaching a prisoner exchange agreement with the government. On 17 December 2004, the Colombian government authorized Trinidad's extradition to the United States, but stated that the measure could be revoked if the FARC–EP released all political hostages and military captives in its possession before 30 December. The FARC–EP rejected the demand.

On 25 March 2006, after a public announcement made weeks earlier, the FARC–EP released two captured policemen at La Dorada, Putumayo. The release took place some 335 miles (539 km) southwest of Bogotá, near the Ecuadorean border. The Red Cross said the two were released in good health. Military operations in the area and bad weather had prevented the release from occurring one week earlier.

In a separate series of events, the German government and a foreign ministry crisis team negotiated the release of civilian hostage and German citizen Lothar Hintze on 4 April 2006 after five years in captivity. Hintze had been kidnapped from a tourist center in Prado on 16 March 2001 for extortion purposes. His wife had paid multiple ransom payments with no result.

One prisoner, Julian Ernesto Guevara Castro, a police officer, died of tuberculosis on 28 January 2006. He was a captain and was captured on 1 November 1998. On 29 March 2009, the FARC–EP announced that they would give Guevara's remains to his mother. The FARC handed over Guevara's remains on 1 April 2010.

Another civilian hostage, Fernando Araújo, later named Minister of Foreign Relations and formerly Development Minister, escaped his captors on 31 December 2006. Araújo had to walk through the jungle for five days before being found by troops in the hamlet of San Agustin, 350 miles (560 km) north of Bogotá. He was kidnapped on 5 December 2000 while jogging in the Caribbean coastal city of Cartagena. He was reunited with his family on 5 January 2007.

Another prisoner, Frank Pinchao, a police officer, escaped his captors on 28 April 2007 after nine years in captivity. He was reunited with his family on 15 May 2007.

==== 2007 death of 11 hostage deputies ====
On 28 June 2007, the FARC–EP reported the death of 11 out of 12 provincial deputies from the Valle del Cauca Department whom the guerrillas had kidnapped in 2002. The guerrillas claimed that the deputies had been killed by crossfire during an attack by an "unidentified military group." The Colombian government stated that government forces had not made any rescue attempts and that the FARC–EP executed the hostages. FARC did not report any other casualties on either side and delayed months before permitting the Red Cross to recover the remains. According to the government, the guerrillas delayed turning over the corpses to let decomposition hide evidence of how they died. The Red Cross reported that the corpses had been washed and their clothing changed before burial, hiding evidence of how they were killed. The Red Cross also reported that the deputies had been killed by multiple close-range shots, many of them in the backs of the victims, and even two by shots to the head.

In February 2009, Sigifredo López, the only deputy who survived and was later released by FARC, accused the group of killing the 11 captives and denied that any military rescue attempt had taken place. According to López, the unexpected arrival of another guerrilla unit resulted in confusion and paranoia, leading the rebels to kill the rest of the Valle deputies. He survived after previously being punished for insubordination and was held in chains nearby but separated from the rest of the group.

==== Early-2008 prisoner events ====
On 10 January 2008, former vice presidential candidate Clara Rojas and former congresswoman Consuelo González were freed after nearly six years in captivity. In a Venezuela-brokered deal, a helicopter flew deep into Colombia to pick up both hostages. The women were escorted out of the jungle by armed guerrillas to a clearing where they were picked up by Venezuelan helicopters that bore International Red Cross insignias. In a statement published on a pro-rebel Web site, the FARC–EP said the unilateral release demonstrated the group's willingness to engage the Colombian government in talks over the release of as many as 800 people who are still being held. In a televised speech, Colombia's U.S.-allied president, Álvaro Uribe, thanked Chávez for his efforts.

During the period she was held kidnapped in the jungle in 2004, Clara Rojas gave birth to her son by Caesarean. At eight months old, the baby was removed from the area and Rojas did not hear of the boy again until 31 December, when she heard Colombian President Álvaro Uribe say on the radio that the child was no longer with her captors. DNA tests later confirmed the boy, who had been living in a Bogotá foster home for more than two years under a different name, was hers. She reclaimed her son. Asked about her opinion of the FARC–EP as group, Rojas called it "a criminal organisation", condemning its kidnappings as "a total violation of human dignity" and saying some captive police and soldiers are constantly chained.

On 31 January 2008, the FARC–EP announced that they would release civilian hostages Luis Eladio Perez Bonilla, Gloria Polanco, and Orlando Beltran Cuellar to Venezuelan President Hugo Chávez as a humanitarian gesture. On 27 February 2008, the three hostages and Jorge Eduardo Gechem Turbay (who was added to the list due to his poor health) were released by FARC–EP. With the authorization of the Colombian government and the participation of the International Red Cross, a Venezuelan helicopter transported them to Caracas from San José del Guaviare. The FARC–EP had called its planned release of the hostages a gesture of recognition for the mediation efforts of Chávez, who had called on the international community to recognize the rebels as belligerents a month prior. Colombian President Álvaro Uribe, who had tense relations with Chávez, thanked the socialist leader and called for the release of all hostages. He said Colombia was still in a fight "against terrorist actions" but was open to reconciliation.

==== Anti-FARC rallies ====
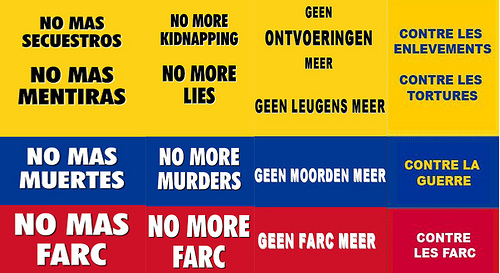
Banner of the February 2008 anti-FARC rallies with slogans in Spanish, English, Dutch, and French. In the French version "contre la torture" and "contre la guerre" mean "against torture" and "against the war" respectively.

On 4 February 2008, anti-FARC protests were held in 45 Colombian cities and towns, with an estimated 1.5 million people coming out in Bogotá alone. Solidarity rallies were held in some 200 cities worldwide including Berlin, Barcelona, London, Madrid, Toronto, Dubai, Miami, New York, Brisbane, and La Paz. The protests were originally organised through Facebook and were also supported by local Colombian media outlets as well as the Colombian government. Participation estimates vary from the hundreds of thousands to several millions of people in Colombia and thousands worldwide.

Shortly before the rallies took place 13 demobilised AUC paramilitary leaders, including Salvatore Mancuso, had expressed their support of the protest through a communique. However, this move was rejected by organiser Carlos Andrés Santiago, who stated that such an endorsement was harmful and criticised the AUC's actions.

On 20 July 2008, a subsequent set of rallies against FARC included thousands of Colombians in Bogotá and hundreds of thousands throughout the rest of the country.

==== Deaths of Raúl Reyes and Manuel Marulanda Vélez ====
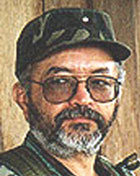
Raúl Reyes

On 1 March 2008, Raul Reyes, a member of FARC's ruling Secretariat, was killed just across the border from Colombia, in the small village of Santa Rosa, Ecuador, after Colombian planes bombarded a FARC camp there. The bombardment was "followed by troops in helicopters who recovered the bodies of Reyes and another 16 rebels." Reyes was the former FARC chief negotiator during the unsuccessful 1998–2002 peace process, and was also a key FARC hostage release negotiator. Reyes' demise marked the first time that a FARC Secretariat member had been killed in combat.

This incident led to a breakdown in diplomatic relations between Ecuador and Colombia, and between Venezuela and Colombia. Ecuador condemned the attack. The incident also resulted in diplomatic strains between the United States and Ecuador, following revelations that the Central Intelligence Agency provided intelligence that allowed the Colombian military to locate the FARC–EP commander and ordnance used in the attack.

It has been considered the biggest blow against FARC–EP in its more than four decades of existence. This event was quickly followed by the death of Iván Ríos, another member of FARC–EP's seven-man Secretariat, less than a week later, by the hand of his own bodyguard. It came as a result of heavy Colombian military pressure and a reward offer of up to $5 million from the Colombian government.

After the attack, the Colombian military forces managed to secure six laptop computers belonging to Reyes, in which they found information linking several left-wing Colombian personalities, such as politicians, journalists and human rights activists with terrorist activities.

Manuel Marulanda Vélez died on 26 March 2008 after a heart attack. His death would be kept a secret, until Colombian magazine Semana published an interview with Colombian defence minister Juan Manuel Santos on 24 May 2008 in which Santos mentions the death of Manuel Marulanda Vélez. The news was confirmed by FARC–EP commander Timochenko on Latin American television station teleSUR on 25 May 2008. Timochenko announced the new commander in chief was Alfonso Cano After speculations in several national and international media about the "softening up" of the FARC and the announcement of Colombian President Álvaro Uribe that several FARC leaders were ready to surrender and free their captives, the secretariat of the FARC sent out a communiqué emphasizing the death of their founder would not change their approach towards the captives or the humanitarian agreement.

==== Late-2008 prisoner events ====
On 11 January 2008 during the annual State of the Nation in the Venezuelan National Assembly, Venezuelan President Hugo Chávez referred to the FARC as "a real army that occupies territory in Colombia, they're not terrorists ... They have a political goal and we have to recognise that". However, on 13 January 2008, Chávez stated his disapproval of the FARC–EP strategy of armed struggle and kidnapping, saying "I don't agree with kidnapping and I don't agree with armed struggle". On 7 March at the Cumbre de Rio, Chávez stated again that the FARC–EP should lay down their arms "Look at what has happened and is happening in Latin America, reflect on this (FARC–EP), we are done with war ... enough with all this death". On 8 June Chavez repeated his call for a political solution and an end to the war, "The guerrilla war is history ... At this moment in Latin America, an armed guerrilla movement is out of place".

On 2 July 2008, under a Colombian military operation called Operation Jaque, the FARC–EP was tricked by the Colombian Government into releasing 15 captives to Colombian Intelligence agents disguised as journalists and international aid workers in a helicopter rescue. Military intelligence agents infiltrated the guerrilla ranks and led the local commander in charge of the captives, Gerardo Aguilar Ramírez, alias Cesar, to believe they were going to take them by helicopter to Alfonso Cano, the guerrillas' supreme leader. The rescued included Íngrid Betancourt (former presidential candidate), U.S. military contractors Marc Gonsalves, Thomas Howes, and Keith Stansell, as well as eleven Colombian police officers and soldiers. The commander, Cesar and one other rebel were taken into custody by agents without incident after boarding the helicopter. On 4 July, some observers questioned whether or not this was an intercepted captive release made to look like a rescue. In a 5 July communique, FARC itself blamed rebels Cesar and Enrique for the escape of the captives and acknowledged the event as a setback but reiterated their willingness to reach future humanitarian agreements. Immediately after the captive rescue, Colombian military forces cornered the rest of FARC–EP's 1st Front, the unit which had held the captives. Colombian forces did not wish to attack the 1st Front but instead offered them amnesty if they surrender. Colombia's Program for Humanitarian Attention for the Demobilized announced in August 2008 that 339 members of Colombia's rebel groups surrendered and handed in their weapons in July, including 282 guerrillas from the Revolutionary Armed Forces of Colombia.

Óscar Tulio Lizcano, a Colombian Conservative Party congressman, was kidnapped 5 August 2000. On Sunday, 26 October 2008, the ex-congressman escaped from FARC–EP rebels. Tulio Lizcano was a hostage for over eight years, and escaped with a FARC–EP rebel he convinced to travel with him. They evaded pursuit for three days as they trekked through mountains and forests, encountering the military in the western coastal region of Colombia. Tulio Lizcano is the first hostage to escape since the successful military rescue of Íngrid Betancourt, and the longest-held political hostage by the organization. He became the 22nd Colombian political hostage to gain freedom during 2008.

During his final days in captivity, Lizcano told Santos, they had nothing to eat but wild palm hearts and sugar cane. With the military tightening the noose, a FARC–EP rebel turned himself in and provided Colombian authorities with Lizcano's exact location in the northwest state of Choco. As police and army troops prepared to launch a rescue operation, Lizcano escaped alongside one of his guerrilla guards who had decided to desert. The two men hiked through the rain forest for three days and nights until they encountered an army patrol. Speaking from a clinic in the western city of Cali, Mr Lizcano said that when soldiers saw him screaming from across a jungle river, they thought he was drunk and ignored him. Only when he lifted the FARC–EP rebel's Galil assault rifle did the soldiers begin to understand that he was escaping from the FARC–EP rebels. "They jumped into the river, and then I started to shout, 'I'm Lizcano'", he said.

Soon after the liberation of this prominent political hostage, the Vice President of Colombia Francisco Santos Calderón called Latin America's biggest guerrilla group a "paper tiger" with little control of the nation's territory, adding that "they have really been diminished to the point where we can say they are a minimal threat to Colombian security", and that "After six years of going after them, reducing their income and promoting reinsertion of most of their members, they look like a paper tiger." However, he warned against any kind of premature triumphalism, because "crushing the rebels will take time". The 500,000 square kilometers (190,000 sq mi) of jungle in Colombia makes it hard to track them down to fight.

==== 2009 prisoner events ====
On 21 December 2008, The FARC–EP announced that they would release civilian hostages Alan Jara, Sigifredo López, three low-ranking police officers and a low-ranking soldier to Senator Piedad Córdoba as a humanitarian gesture. On 1 February 2009, the FARC–EP proceeded with the release of the four security force members, Juan Fernando Galicio Uribe, José Walter Lozano Guarnizo, Alexis Torres Zapata and William Giovanni Domínguez Castro. All of them were captured in 2007. Jara (kidnapped in 2001) was released on 3 February and López (kidnapped in 2002) was released on 5 February.

On 17 March 2009, The FARC–EP released Swedish hostage Erik Roland Larsson. Larsson, paralyzed in half his body, was handed over to detectives in a rugged region of the northern state of Córdoba. Larsson was kidnapped from his ranch in Tierralta, not far from where he was freed, on 16 May 2007, along with his Colombian girlfriend, Diana Patricia Pena while paying workers. She escaped that same month following a gun battle between her captors and police. Larsson suffered a stroke while in captivity. The FARC–EP had sought a $5 million ransom. One of Larsson's sons said that the ransom was not paid.

On 22 December 2009, the body of Luis Francisco Cuéllar, the Governor of Caquetá, was discovered, a day after he had been kidnapped from his house in Florencia, Caquetá. Officials said the abduction and execution had been carried by the FARC. According to officials, he had been killed soon after the abduction. The kidnappers cut the governor's throat as they evaded security forces. In a statement broadcast on radio, the acting governor, Patricia Vega, said, "I no longer have any doubts that FARC has done it again." The FARC claimed responsibility for Cuéllar's kidnapping and murder in January 2010. The group said that they kidnapped him in order to "put him on trial for corruption" and blamed his death on an attempt to rescue him by force.

On 16 April 2009, the FARC–EP announced that they would release Army Corporal Pablo Emilio Moncayo Cabrera to Piedad Córdoba as a humanitarian gesture. Moncayo was kidnapped on 21 December 1997. On 28 June 2009, the FARC announced that they would release soldier Josue Daniel Calvo Sanchez. Calvo was kidnapped on 20 April 2009. Calvo was released on 28 March 2010. Moncayo was released on 30 March 2010.

On 13 June 2010, Colombian troops rescued Police Colonel Luis Herlindo Mendieta Ovalle, Police Captain Enrique Murillo Sanchez and Army Sergeant Arbey Delgado Argote in an event known as Operation Chameleon, twelve years after the individuals were captured; Argote was kidnapped on 3 August 1998. Ovalle and Sanchez were kidnapped on 1 November 1998. On 14 June, Police Lieutenant William Donato Gomez was also rescued. He was also kidnapped on 3 August 1998.

=== Santos presidency (2010–2018) ===
==== 2010–2011: Increased violence ====
President Juan Manuel Santos began his term with a suspected FARC bomb-blast in Bogotá. This followed the resolution of the 2010 Colombia–Venezuela diplomatic crisis which erupted over outgoing President Álvaro Uribe's allegations of active Venezuelan support for FARC.

In early September 2010, FARC–EP attacks in the Nariño Department and Putumayo Department in southern Colombia killed some fifty policemen and soldiers in hit-and-run assaults.

According to a December report by the Corporación Nuevo Arco Iris NGO, 473 FARC–EP guerrillas and 357 members of the Colombian security forces died in combat between January and September 2010. An additional 1,382 government soldiers or policemen were wounded during the same period, with the report estimating that the total number of casualties could reach 2,500 by the end of the year. Nuevo Arco Iris head León Valencia considered that FARC guerrillas have reacted to a series of successful military blows against them by splitting up their forces into smaller groups and intensifying the offensive use of anti-personnel land mines, leading to what he called a further "degradation" of the conflict. Valencia also added that both coca crops and the drug trade have "doubled" in areas with FARC–EP presence. Researcher Claudia López considered that the Colombian government is winning the strategic and aerial side of the war but not the infantry front, where both the FARC–EP and ELN continue to maintain an offensive capacity.

The International Crisis Group claimed that the military offensives carried out under former President Álvaro Uribe and President Juan Manuel Santos had led to the number of FARC-EC combatants being reduced to around 7,000, less than half the 20,000 combatants estimated to have been employed by the FARC-EC in the early 2000s. The same organization also stated that the military offensive had been able to reduce FARC territorial control and push guerillas to more remote and sparsely populated regions, often close to territorial or internal borders.

Colombian authorities announced the death of Víctor Julio Suárez Rojas, also known as Mono Jojoy, on 23 September 2010. President Juan Manuel Santos stated that the FARC commander was killed in an operation that began in the early hours of 21 September in the department of Meta, 200 miles (320 km) south of the capital Bogotá. According to Santos, he was "the impersonation of terror and a symbol of violence". After this event, the FARC–EP released a statement saying that defeating the group would not bring peace to Colombia and called for a negotiated solution, not surrender, to the social and political conflict.

In January 2011 Juan Manuel Santos admitted that FARC–EP had killed 460 government soldiers and wounded over 2,000 in 2010. In April 2011 the Colombian congress issued a statement saying that FARC has a "strong presence" in roughly one third of the municipalities in Colombia, while their attacks have increased. Overall FARC operations, including attacks against security forces as well as kidnappings and the use of land mines, have increased every year since 2005. In the first six months of 2011 the FARC carried out an estimated 1,115 actions, which constitutes a 10% increase over the same period in 2010.

By early 2011 Colombian authorities and news media reported that the FARC and the clandestine sister groups had partly shifted strategy from guerrilla warfare to "a war of militias", meaning that they were increasingly operating in civilian clothes while hiding amongst sympathizers in the civilian population. In early January 2011 the Colombian army said that the FARC has some 18,000 members, with 9,000 of those forming part of the militias. The army says it has identified at least 1,400 such militia members in the FARC strongholds of Valle del Cauca and Cauca in 2011. In June 2011 Colombian chief of staff Edgar Cely claimed that the FARC wants to "urbanize their actions", which could partly explain the increased guerrilla activity in Medellín and particularly Cali. Jeremy McDermott, co-director of Insight Crime, estimates that FARC may have some 30,000 'part-time fighters' in 2011, consisting of both armed and unarmed civilian supporters making up the rebel militia network, instead of full-time fighters wearing uniforms.

According to Corporación Nuevo Arco Iris, FARC–EP killed 429 members of the Colombian government's security forces between January and October 2011. During this same period, the rebel group lost 316 of its own members. The year 2011 saw over 2,000 incidents of FARC activity, which was the highest figure recorded since 1998. The NGO has stated that while most of these incidents remain defensive in nature and were not like the large offensives from years past, FARC actions grew since 2005, and the rebel group was carrying out intense operations against small and medium-sized Colombian military units in vulnerable areas.

Colombian troops killed FARC leader Alfonso Cano in a firefight on 4 November 2011. The 6th Front of the FARC, which was in charge of Cano's security at the time of his death, retaliated by killing two policemen in Suarez and Jambaló some 24 hours after the death of Cano. After the death of Alfonso Cano, Timoleón Jiménez, nicknamed Timochenko, took over the FARC–EP leadership.

On 26 November 2011, the FARC killed Police Captain Edgar Yesid Duarte Valero, Police Lieutenant Elkin Hernández Rivas, Army Corporal Libio José Martínez Estrada, and Police Intendant Álvaro Moreno after government troops approached the guerrilla camp where they were held in an area of the Caqueta department. Police Sergeant Luis Alberto Erazo Maya managed to escape his captors and was later rescued.

The Colombian military had information indicating that there could be captives in the area and initiated Operation Jupiter in October 2011, using a 56 men Special Forces unit to carry out surveillance for preparing a future rescue mission that would involve additional troops and air support. According to the Colombian military, this same unit remained in the area for 43 days and did not find the captives until they accidentally ran into the FARC camp on the way back, which led to a shootout. Relatives of the captives, former victims and civil society groups blamed both the government and FARC for the outcome, questioning the operation as well as criticizing military rescues.

==== 2012–2015: Peace talks and end of the armed conflict ====
In 2012, FARC announced they would no longer participate in kidnappings for ransom and released the last ten soldiers and police officers they kept as prisoners, but it has kept silent about the status of hundreds of civilians still reported as hostages, and continued kidnapping soldiers and civilians. On 26 February 2012, the FARC announced that they would release their remaining ten political hostages. The hostages were released on 2 April 2012. The president of Colombia, Juan Manuel Santos, said that this incident was "not enough", and asked the FARC to release the civilian hostages they possess.

On 22 November 2012, the FARC released four Chinese oil workers. The hostages were working for the Emerald Energy oil company, a British-based subsidiary of China's Sinochem Group, when they were kidnapped on 8 June 2011. Their Colombian driver was also kidnapped, but released several hours later. Authorities identified the freed men as Tang Guofu, Zhao Hongwei, Jian Mingfu, and Jiang Shan.

Santos announced on 27 August 2012 that the Colombian government has engaged in talks with FARC in order to seek an end to the conflict:

Exploratory conversations have been held with the FARC to find an end to the conflict. I want to make very clear to Colombians that the approaches that have been carried out and the ones that will happen in the future will be carried out within the framework based on these principles: We are going to learn from the mistakes made in the past so that they are not repeated. Second, any process must lead to the end of the conflict, not making it longer. Third, operations and military presence will be maintained across the entire national territory.

He also said that he would learn from the mistakes of previous leaders, who failed to secure a lasting ceasefire with FARC, though the military would still continue operations throughout Colombia while talks continued. An unnamed Colombian intelligence source said Santos has assured FARC that no one would be extradited to stand trial in another country. Al Jazeera reported that the initiative began after Santos met with Venezuelan President Hugo Chávez and asked him to mediate. Former President Uribe has criticized Santos for seeking peace "at any cost" and rejected the idea of holding talks. Telesur reported that FARC and the Colombian government had signed a preliminary agreement in Havana the same day. The first round of the talks will take place in Oslo on 5 October and then return to Havana for approximately six months of talks before culminating in Colombia. However, Santos later ruled out a ceasefire pending the talks in Oslo and reiterated that offensive operations against FARC would continue.

ELN leader Nicolás Rodríguez Bautista, otherwise known as Gabino, added that his group was interested in joining the talks too: "Well we are open, it's exactly our proposal, to seek room for open dialogue without conditions and start to discuss the nation's biggest problems. But the government has said no! Santos says he has the keys to peace in his pocket, but I think he has lost them because there seems to be no possibility of a serious dialogue, we remain holding out for that."

Colombia's RCN Radio reported on 29 September that a preliminary draft of the proposals indicated that a resolution would involve answering FARC's historic grievances including rural development and agrarian reform; democracy development via an enhancement of the number of registered political parties; security and compensation for the victims of the conflict. In these regards, the Colombian government has already passed a series of laws that entail compensation for the victims and a return of land to the displaced. FARC also indicated a willingness to give up their arms. Former M19 member Antonio Navarro Wolff said: "If the government wants a serious peace plan they will have to take control of the coca leaf plantations that are currently owned by the FARC because if not another criminal group will take over it." Santos later told Al Jazeera that peace was possible if there was "goodwill" on both sides. Santos told the General debate of the sixty-seventh session of the United Nations General Assembly on 26 September, that Venezuela and Chile were also helping in the discussion along with Cuba and Norway.

Peace talks were formally started on 18 October in a hotel 30 miles north of the Norwegian capital Oslo with a joint-press conference by both delegations. The representatives of the government, led by Humberto de la Calle and the FARC, led by Iván Márquez, said the so-called second phase of the peace process will be inaugurated in Oslo on 15 November, after which the delegations will go to Cuba to work on the negotiation of the peace accord, which will ultimately lead to a permanent agreement and ceasefire. The Colombian government has also stated that they expect that a post-Chávez government will continue to support the peace process. In late 2012, FARC declared a two-month unilateral cease-fire and said that they would be open to extending it as a bilateral truce afterwards during the rest of the negotiations. The Colombian government refused to agree to a bilateral cease-fire, alleging violations of the truce by FARC.

Shortly after lifting the ceasefire, FARC conducted attacks on a coal transport railway, which derailed 17 wagons and forced a suspension of operations and assaulted Milán, Caquetá, a town in the southern Caquetá, killing at least seven government soldiers and injuring five others.

Santos has been far more responsive to threats against social leaders than his predecessors. He has also been decisive in combatting the New Illegal Armed Groups that emerged as a result of the paramilitary process, especially in fighting threats and violence against human rights defenders and social leaders. During Santos' presidency, private security and proclaimed self-defense movements have also lost their legitimacy.

On 27 May 2013, it was announced that one of the most contentious issues had been resolved. Land reform and compensation was tackled with promises to compensate those who had lost land. This is the first time the government and FARC have reached an agreement on a substantive issue in four different negotiating attempts over 30 years. The peace process then moved on to the issue of "political participation", during which FARC insisted on its demand for an elected Constituent Assembly to rewrite Colombia's constitution. This demand has been forcefully rejected by Colombia's lead government negotiator, Humberto de la Calle.

On 20 June 2013, FARC kidnapped American tourist Kevin Scott Sutay. He was released on 27 October 2013.

On 1 July 2013, FARC and the second-largest guerrilla group in Colombia, ELN, announced that they would be working together to find a "political solution to the social and armed conflict." The details of this partnership, however, were far from clear; Washington Office on Latin America's Adam Isacson explains that two issues central to peace accords with ELN—resource policy and kidnapping—are currently off the table in the talks in Havana with FARC, and the addition of these topics may complicate and slow down an already sluggish process.

On 6 November 2013 the Colombian government and FARC announced that they had come to an agreement regarding the participation of political opposition and would begin discussing their next issue, the illicit drug trade.

On 23 January 2014 Juan Fernando Cristo, the President of the Senate of Colombia, proposed a second Plan Colombia during a conference on the Colombian peace process in Washington, D.C. Cristo stated that this new plan should be "for the victims" and should redirect the resources from the original Plan Colombia towards supporting a post-conflict Colombia.

On 16 May 2014, the Colombian government and the FARC rebels agreed to work together against drug trafficking, added to the development of these peace talks.

On 28 June 2015, humanitarian and spiritual leader Ravi Shankar, on a three-day-visit to Cuba, had several rounds of discussions with FARC members in an exercise of confidence-building in the peace process, which had many hurdles from the past three years.

FARC requested Shankar to actively participate in the peace process. He said, "In this conflict, everyone should be considered as victims. And inside every culprit, there is a victim crying for help."

After many discussions, FARC finally agreed to embrace the Gandhian principle of non-violence. Commander Ivan Marquez declared in the press conference that they would adopt it. The FARC agreed that hatred had derailed the peace process. Marquez said, "We will work for peace and justice for all the people of Colombia."

On 8 July 2015, FARC announced a unilateral ceasefire, which began on 20 July 2015.

On 30 September 2015, Ravi Shankar accused Norway of sidetracking his effort at brokering a peace deal between the Colombian government and FARC, after Norway, which was part of a four-nation group (along with Cuba, Chile and Venezuela) acting as guarantors in the talks, released a statement saying that the peace deal was a result of "painstaking efforts undertaken by a league of Western nations".

==== 2016–2017: Ceasefire and disarming ====
On 23 June 2016 a ceasefire accord was signed between the FARC Guerilla Army and the Colombian Government, in Havana, Cuba. Leaders of several Latin American countries which contributed to the deal, including Cuba and Venezuela, were present. The final peace accord required a referendum to be approved.

Under the accord, the Colombian government will support massive investment for rural development and facilitate the FARC's reincarnation as a legal political party. FARC promised to help eradicate illegal drug crops, remove landmines in the areas of conflict, and offer reparations to victims. FARC leaders can avoid prosecution by acts of reparation to victims and other community work.

On 2 October 2016 Colombians voted and rejected the peace deal with FARC by 50.2% to 49.8%.

The government met with victims and peace opponents after the referendum was rejected, receiving over 500 proposed changes, and continued to negotiate with FARC. A revised agreement announced on 12 November 2016, which would require parliamentary approval rather than a nationwide referendum. Former President and chief peace opponent Álvaro Uribe met with President Juan Manuel Santos and thereafter issued a noncommittal statement that he awaited release of the full text. Among the reported 60 new or modified terms was a provision for FARC assets to be distributed for victim compensation. FARC members would be able to establish a political party, and would in general be granted full immunity for full confession and cooperation, although drug trafficking would be assessed on a case-by-case basis. Peace terms would be enforced by a Special Justice for the Peace, who would report to the Constitutional Court and not to an international body, and both Parliament and the Special Justice would have the ability to modify the terms of the agreement as seen necessary.

The Colombian government and the FARC on 24 November signed a revised peace deal, which Congress approved on 30 November.

On 18 February 2017, the last FARC guerrillas arrived in a designated transition zone, where they began the process of disarming. The rebels stayed in the zones until 31 May, after which they were registered and reintegrated into civilian life.

On 27 June 2017, the FARC ceased to be an armed group, with its forces disarming and handing more than 7,000 weapons to the United Nations at a ceremony hosted by the FARC leadership, and the Colombian government, which included the Cabinet and President Juan Manuel Santos. Peace observers had received the coordinates of 873 weapons caches hidden in Colombia's remote forests and mountains. The UN was able to remove 510 of these weapons caches, leaving the remaining 363 caches for the military to pick up.

The last batch of weapons belonging to former FARC rebels has been removed under UN supervision. The United Nations collected 8,112 guns, 1.3 million bullets, 22 tons of explosives, 3,000 grenades and 1,000 land mines from the FARC.

The Special Jurisdiction of Peace (Jurisdicción Especial para la Paz, JEP) would be the transitional justice component of the Comprehensive System, complying with Colombia's duty to investigate, clarify, prosecute and punish serious human rights violations and grave breaches of international humanitarian law which occurred during the armed conflict. Its objectives would be to satisfy victims' right to justice, offer truth to the public, contribute to the reparation of victims, contribute to the fight against impunity, adopt decisions which give full legal security to direct and indirect participants in the conflict and contribute to the achievement of a stable and lasting peace. At the end of a six-day visit to Colombia, on 9 October 2017 the UN Assistant Secretary-General for human rights Andrew Gilmour issued statement welcoming progress in the demobilization and disarmament of the FARC. However, he expressed, "concern about problems in the implementation of the accords which relate to the continued attacks against human rights defenders and community leaders."

=== Duque presidency (2018–2022) ===
==== Membership in Colombian Congress ====
On 20 July 2019, ten former FARC members, including former senior leader Pablo Catatumbo, were sworn in as members of the Congress of Colombia. All of these ex-rebels are members of the Common Alternative Revolutionary Force political party. Five of these ten ex-FARC rebels were sworn in as members of the House of Representatives, while the other five were sworn in as members of the Senate. As part of the peace agreement, these ten seats will remain under control of members from the Common Alternative Revolutionary Force until 2026.

==== 2019: Attempt to reinstate FARC ====
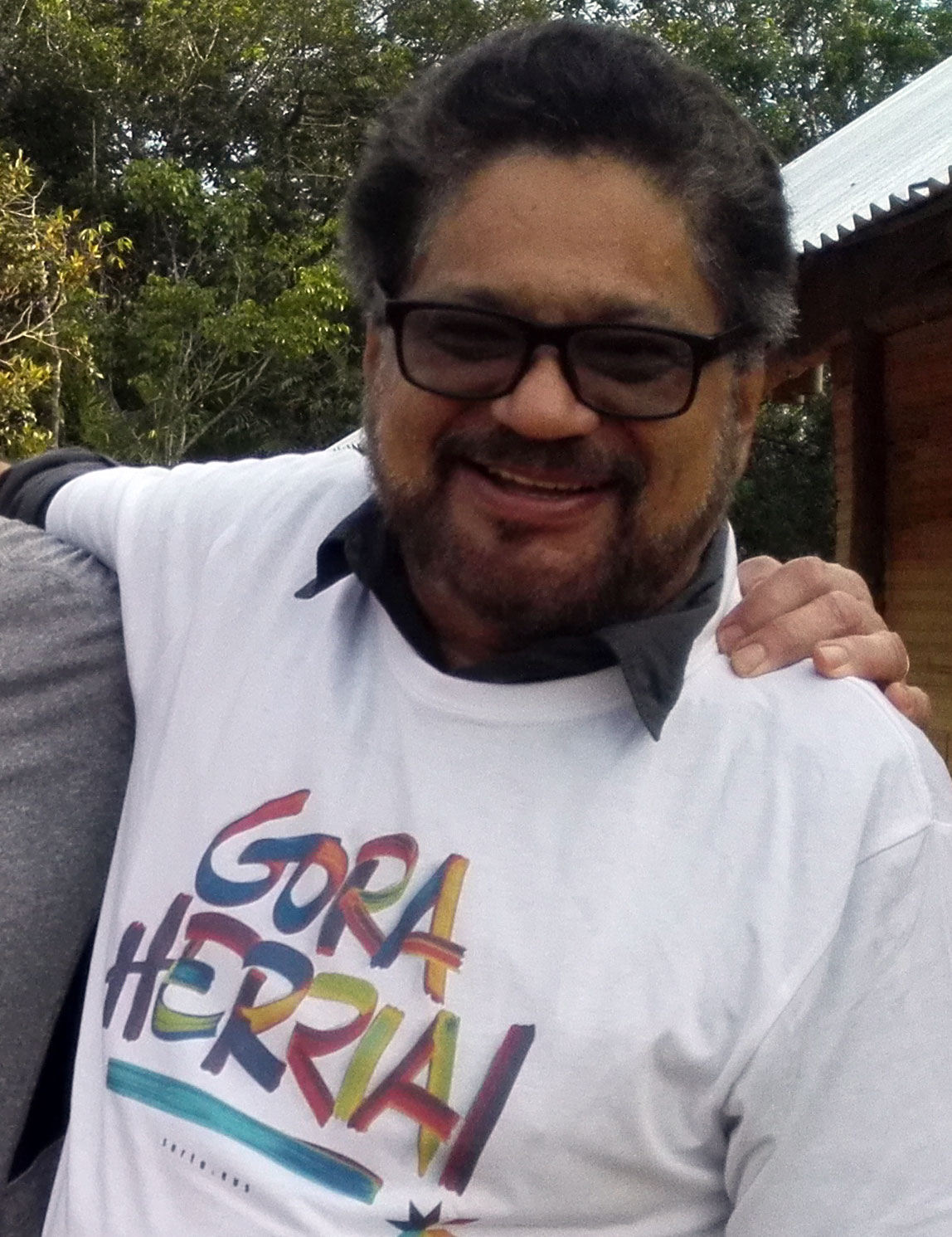
Former second-in-command FARC leader, Iván Márquez, who called for renewed actions against the Colombian government

In a video published on 29 August 2019, former second-in-command FARC leader Iván Márquez announced his return to arms in the name of the guerrilla movement. Márquez denounced that the Government did not comply with its part of the Havana accord, with 667 local activists and 150 former guerrillas killed since the peace accord was signed. This position was criticized by former FARC supreme leader Rodrigo Londoño, who assured that his party remains committed to peace agreements and that "[m]ore than 90 percent of former FARC guerrillas remain committed to the peace process". Londoño also criticized Márquez, stating that the majority of former guerrillas killed were FARC dissidents who continued armed actions.

After the announcement, President Iván Duque authorized the Joint Special Operations Command to start an offensive operation. Government forces conducted a bombing raid in San Vicente del Caguán in which twelve people identified as FARC dissidents were killed. According to Duque, one of them, Gildardo Cucho, was the leader of the group which would be joining Iván Márquez in the rearmament. Duque also accused Venezuelan president Nicolás Maduro of assisting FARC and providing a safe haven for militants in Venezuela.

A Truth Commission report released in 2022 shows that the drug trafficking charges against Jesús Santrich and his arrest in 2019 were a plot by the DEA and Colombian Attorney General Néstor Humberto Martínez to jeopardize the peace agreement, incite the FARC to take up arms again, and send a message to the public that the peace agreement had failed.

==== 2020–2021 ====
General Luis Fernando Navarro asserted on January 5, 2021, that FARC lost 1,500 members in 2020. The number includes deaths, capture, and desertions. He said the FARC still had 2,500 armed members.

== Financing ==
FARC received most of its funding—which was estimated to average some US$300 million per year—from taxation of the illegal drug trade and other activities, ransom kidnappings, bank robberies, and extortion of large landholders, multinational corporations, and agribusiness. From taxation of illegal drugs and other economic activity, FARC was estimated to receive US$60–100 million per year.

=== Means of financing ===
The guerillas's main means of financing was through the drug trade which includes both direct and indirect participation; taxation, administration or control of areas of production and trafficking. A large but often difficult to estimate portion of funding comes from the taxation of businesses and even local farmers, often lumped in with or defined by its opponents as extortion.

==== Drug trade ====
FARC was not initially involved in direct drug cultivation, trafficking, or trans-shipment prior to or during the 1980s. Instead, it maintained a system of taxation on the production that took place in the territories that they controlled, in exchange for protecting the growers and establishing law and order in these regions by implementing its own rules and regulations. During the 1990s, FARC expanded its operations, in some areas, to include trafficking and production, which had provided a significant portion of its funding. Right-wing paramilitary groups also receive a large portion of their income from drug trafficking and production operations.

A 1992 Central Intelligence Agency report "acknowledged that the FARC had become increasingly involved in drugs through their "taxing" of the trade in areas under their geographical control and that in some cases the insurgents protected trafficking infrastructure to further fund their insurgency", but also described the relationship between the FARC and the drug traffickers as one "characterized by both cooperation and friction" and concluded that "we do not believe that the drug industry [in Colombia] would be substantially disrupted in the short term by attacks against guerrillas. Indeed, many traffickers would probably welcome, and even assist, increased operations against insurgents."

In 1994, the Drug Enforcement Administration (DEA) came to three similar conclusions. First, that any connections between drug trafficking organizations and Colombian insurgents were "ad hoc 'alliances of convenience'". Second, that "the independent involvement of insurgents in Colombia's domestic drug productions, transportation, and distribution is limited ... there is no evidence that the national leadership of either the FARC or the ELN has directed, as a matter of policy, that their respective organizations directly engage in independent illicit drug production, transportation, or distribution." Third, the report determined that the DEA "has no evidence that the FARC or ELN have been involved in the transportation, distribution, or marketing of illegal drugs in the United States. Furthermore it is doubtful that either insurgent group could develop the international transportation and logistics infrastructure necessary to establish independent drug distribution in the United States or Europe ... DEA believes that the insurgents never will be major players in Colombia's drug trade."

FARC had called for crop substitution programs that would allow coca farmers to find alternative means of income and subsistence. In 1999, FARC worked with a United Nations alternative development project to enable the transition from coca production to sustainable food production. On its own, the group had also implemented agrarian reform programs in Putumayo.

In those FARC controlled territories that do produce coca, it is generally grown by peasants on small plots; in paramilitary or government controlled areas, coca is generally grown on large plantations. The FARC–EP generally made sure that peasant coca growers receive a much larger share of profits than the paramilitaries would give them, and demanded that traffickers pay a decent wage to their workers. When growers in a FARC-controlled area were caught selling coca to non-FARC brokers, they were generally forced to leave the region, but when growers were caught selling to FARC in paramilitary-controlled areas, they were generally killed. Lower prices paid for raw coca in paramilitary-controlled areas lead to significantly larger profits for the drug processing and trafficking organizations, which means that they generally prefer that paramilitaries control an area rather than FARC.

In 2000, FARC Spokesman Simon Trinidad said that taxes on drug laboratories represented an important part of the organization's income, although he did not say how much it was. He defended this funding source, arguing that drug trade was endemic in Colombia because it had pervaded many sectors of its economy.

After 21 April 2001 capture of Brazilian drug lord Luiz Fernando da Costa (a.k.a. Fernandinho Beira-Mar) in Colombia, Colombian and Brazilian authorities accused him of cooperating with FARC–EP through the exchange of weapons for cocaine. They also claimed that he received armed protection from the guerrilla group.

On 18 March 2002 the Attorney General of the United States John Ashcroft indicted leaders of the FARC after an 18-month investigation into their narcotics trafficking. Tomás Molina Caracas, the commander of the FARC's 16th Front, led the 16th Front's drug-trafficking activities together with Carlos Bolas and a rebel known as Oscar El Negro. Between 1994 and 2001, Molina and other 16th Front members controlled Barranco Minas, where they collected cocaine from other FARC fronts to sell it to international drug traffickers for payment in currency, weapons and equipment.

On 22 March 2006 the Attorney General Alberto Gonzales announced the indictment of fifty leaders of FARC for exporting more than $25 billion worth of cocaine to the United States and other countries. Several of the FARC leaders appeared on the Justice Department's Consolidated Priority Organization target list, which identifies the most dangerous international drug trafficking organizations. Recognizing the increased profits, the FARC moved to become directly involved in the manufacture and distribution of cocaine by setting the price paid for cocaine paste and transporting it to jungle laboratories under FARC control. The charged FARC leaders ordered that Colombian farmers who sold paste to non-FARC buyers would be murdered and that U.S. fumigation planes should be shot down.

On 11 October 2012 Jamal Yousef, a.k.a. "Talal Hassan Ghantou", a native of Lebanon, was sentenced to 12 years in prison for conspiring to provide military-grade weapons to the Fuerzas Armadas Revolucionarias de Colombia (the FARC), in exchange for over a ton of cocaine. Yousef pleaded guilty in May 2012 to one count of providing material support to the FARC.

==== Kidnappings ====
The FARC–EP carried out both ransom and politically motivated kidnappings in Colombia and was responsible for the majority of such kidnappings carried out in the country.

The guerrillas initially targeted the families of drug traffickers, the wealthy upper-class and foreigners but the group later expanded its kidnapping and extortion operations to include the middle-class.

During the 1984 peace negotiations, FARC pledged to stop kidnapping and condemned the practice. However, hostage-taking by FARC increased in the years following this declaration. In a 1997 interview, FARC–EP Commander Alfonso Cano argued that some guerrilla units continued to do so for "political and economic reasons" in spite of the prohibition issued by the leadership.

In 2000, the FARC–EP issued a directive called "Law 002" which demanded a "tax" from all individuals and corporations with assets worth at least US$1 million, warning that those who failed to pay would be detained by the group. In 2001, FARC Commander Simón Trinidad claimed that the FARC–EP does not engage in kidnapping but instead "retains [individuals] in order to obtain resources needed for our struggle". Commander Trinidad said he did not know how many people had been taken by FARC or how much money was collected by the organization in exchange for their freedom. In addition, FARC spokesperson Joaquín Gómez stated that the payment demanded was a tax which many people paid "voluntarily", with kidnapping undertaken because "those who have the resources must pay their share".

In 2002, Amnesty International sent a letter to FARC–EP Commander Manuel Marulanda condemning kidnapping and hostage-taking as well as rejecting the threats directed at municipal or judicial officials and their families, arguing that they are civilians who are protected by international humanitarian law as long as they do not participate in hostilities.

According to Amnesty International, the number of kidnappings decreased in the last years of the conflict, but the human rights organization estimated that FARC and ELN guerrillas continued to be behind hundreds of cases until their disarming. In 2008, press reports estimated that about 700 hostages continued to be held captive by FARC. According to the Fundación País Libre anti-kidnapping NGO, an estimated total of 6,778 people were kidnapped by FARC between 1997 and 2007. In 2009, the state's anti-kidnapping agency Fondelibertad reviewed 3,307 officially unsettled cases and removed those that had already been resolved or for which there was insufficient information. The agency concluded that 125 hostages remained in captivity nationwide of whom 66 were being held by the FARC–EP. The government's revised figures were considered "absurdly low" by Fundación País Libre, which has argued that its own archives suggest an estimated 1,617 people taken hostage between 2000 and 2008 remain in the hands of their captors, including hundreds seized by FARC. FARC claimed at the time that it was holding nine people for ransom in addition to hostages kept for a prisoner exchange.

In 2008, Venezuelan President Hugo Chávez expressed his disagreement with FARC–EP's resorting to kidnappings. Former President Fidel Castro of Cuba also criticized the use of hostage-taking by the guerrillas as "objectively cruel" and suggested that the group free all of its prisoners and hostages.

In February 2012, FARC announced that it would release ten members of the security forces, who it described as political prisoners, representing the last such captives in its custody. It further announced the repeal of Law 002, bringing to an end its support for the practice of kidnapping for ransom. However, it was not clear from the FARC statement what would happen to the civilians it still held in captivity. Colombian president Juan Manuel Santos used Twitter to welcome the move as a "necessary, if insufficient, step in the right direction".

== Women in the Revolutionary Armed Forces of Colombia ==
=== Participation and roles ===
Estimates of the number of female combatants in the FARC vary. Some sources suggest that women made up approximately 40% of the Revolutionary Armed Forces of Colombia (FARC). Furthermore, between 1985 and 2012, it was estimated that over 11,000 women had been group members. Other studies present lower figures. By 2000, according to Carey (2006), women made up one-third of FARC's members. Similarly, Gutíerrez Sanín (2008) found that female participation varied by unit. Female participation was approximately 30% within units attached to FARC's top leadership, likely due to the presence of orderlies and secretaries, while central operational units had less than 10% female participation. In contrast, women's participation was much higher on the more "typical" combat fronts, accounting for 19% of the unit's members.

According to former guerrillas, FARC–EP units typically consist of one-quarter to nearly one-half women, with some even containing girls aged eight or nine. This practice is not unique to FARC; other armed groups in Colombia also recruit girls and women as combatants. Of the 112 former child guerillas interviewed by Human Rights Watch, over a quarter were girls, most of whom were former members of FARC–EP.

Contrary to traditional gender roles, women actively engaged in combat on the frontlines alongside their male counterparts, rather than being restricted to domestic tasks such as nursing or cooking. They trained in weapon handling, intelligence gathering, and military operations, and, like their male colleagues, they faced the same risks of death and injury.

=== History of women in the FARC ===
==== Early Involvement and marginalization (1960s–1970s) ====
Women's involvement in the Revolutionary Armed Forces of Colombia (FARC) began early, with two of the group's original 48 combatants being female during the Marquetalia resistance. However, their roles were largely supportive rather than combat-oriented. In the 1960s, FARC operated as a peasant self-defense group primarily consisting of male combatants. Women and children were present daily but did not engage in combat or leadership roles. In fact, according to one guerrilla fighter,

"In the 1960s, women accompanied men and participated in activities like cooking. During the Marquetalia resistance in 1964, women were helpers, they did not carry weapons. They participated actively, but were not fundamental. In the 1960s we had a mix of people... with women, children and even dogs."

In the latter half of the 1960s, FARC transformed into a mobile guerrilla armed group from a domestic model. It became an almost all-male force; men were expected to leave behind their families to form a fully mobilized unit, while women were largely relegated to support roles like assistance and cooking.

FARC maintained ties with the pro-Soviet Communist Party (CP), which sought to promote female participation by creating specialized women's organizations, following a broader trend among communist movements worldwide. FARC, in tandem, also formed specialized female organizations; however, they were restricted to traditional roles such as cooking, food organization, and laundry. Neither the CP nor FARC expected women to engage in combat.

==== Internal debates and shifting roles (1970s–1980s) ====
As FARC expanded in the 1970s, women's involvement in the group became a topic of debate. Tirofijo, FARC's leader at the time, originally opposed women's participation in combat, citing their physical limitations for combat and lack of resilience as concerns. However, as FARC transformed into a more structured and militaristic army, it became evident that women's roles and participation needed to expand. During FARC's 7th National Conference in 1982, women's rights were added to the force's agenda; however, it only concerned women's rights within the group rather than broader gender equality.

At the same time, FARC rebranded itself as the Revolutionary Armed Forces of Colombia – People's Army (FARC–EP) and adopted a stricter hierarchical and militaristic structure. This shift emphasized strict discipline, separation from civilians, lifelong commitment, ideological instruction, continuous training, and tight control over members' personal lives. These changes stimulated a greater incentive and need to include women within its combat ranks.

==== Gender equality and military integration (1980s) ====
By 1985, FARC officially declared gender equality within its ranks and started actively recruiting women as combatants. The integration of women helped to reinforce the group's independence and autonomy by diminishing the effect of outside influences, as a members' entire lives—personal and professional—could exist within the confines of the organization.

==== FARC's 2016 declaration: women at the forefront of change ====
In 2016, FARC publicly declared to be part of a "worldwide [movement] against...patriarchy and all forms of discrimination between human beings," a stance driven mainly by women within the group.

=== Motivation of women for joining ===
Women and girls cite various reasons for joining FARC. The top motives include domestic or sexual abuse and an overall lack of meaningful options for women in Colombia. Oftentimes, in some regions, they will join armed groups as a way to avoid prostitution or working in cocoa production. This is especially true for women from rural areas who are enmeshed in poverty. However, women do not join just to avoid plights in their regions. To them, FARC often represents a way to escape restrictive gender roles and to access educational and leadership opportunities not available to women in the broader Colombian public. For example, a female FARC commander wanted to join at age 13 to learn how to read. However, she was told she could not join until she turned 14 years old. Another reason that women join is to gain the opportunity to defend their political convictions, which is especially true for wealthier, more educated women. Women essentially use their limited options to be able to safeguard and champion for female social and reproductive rights. In addition to ideological and educational motivations, some women and girls are drawn to the power that the FARC represents. Like many male recruits, female recruits are attracted to the group's militaristic elements. They like the idea of a uniform and being able to carry a gun. Female combatants also often join under the impression that they will be on the same level as their male counterparts; one of the FARC's main allures is the assertion of gender equality within its ranks. Overall, FARC functions as a "lifeline" to many girls and women, representing a space where female combatants can find "a certain degree of autonomy and personal development," which is often inaccessible to Colombian women, especially ones from rural regions.

=== Gender dynamics in FARC ===
==== Daily life and gender policies ====
During its tenure, FARC officially promoted gender equality: both men and women received the same basic military training, shared living quarters, and performed equal duties in combat. Some women even wore feminine embellishments, such as jewelry, in contrast to the group's militarized masculinity. In regions like Putumayo, FARC installed clear behavioral rules, mediating domestic disputes and punishing gender-based violence—sometimes with severe penalties, like death. FARC formally prohibited sexual harassment and rape and, unlike some other paramilitary groups, did not systematically use sexual violence to assert territorial control. Despite these regulations, significant gender-based disparities persisted in practice.

==== Exploitation and power imbalances ====
Many women and girls faced gendered exploitation. Commanders often would use their authority to start sexual relationships with underage girls in exchange for privileges, gifts, and protection. These relationships—sometimes described as consensual—occurred in a context of a stark power imbalance, where refusal was difficult, and a female combatant's safety often depended on compliance. Furthermore, many female combatants reportedly faced sexual harassment or assault.

==== Division of labor ====
A gendered division of labor was present. While women also fought, trained, and were subject to the same rules as men, women were often relegated to traditionally feminine roles, such as nursing or radio operating. Women in the FARC typically held the lowest positions in the groups, often carrying gear, marching, and caring for hostages. On that note, men rarely attended to hostages—this role was almost exclusively assigned to women. Overall, women were primarily foot soldiers with heavy workloads equal to the men.

==== Leadership and advancement ====
Opportunities for career advancement were limited. While some women led small units, only one—Elsa Nedis Mosquera, known as "Karina"—rose to the position of Front Commander. No woman reached the top decision-making body, the Secretariat. Male members overwhelmingly held higher leadership roles. Success and survival often hinged on the sexual "services" they provided, leading many women to view their bodies as tools or weapons within the group's internal power structure. Some women gained influence through relationships with male leaders, receiving privileges such as better guard shifts or informal leadership roles. Alternatively, women could rise through the ranks through ruthlessness and prowess in combat. Leadership roles, especially for women, often came at a tremendous personal cost. Success frequently depended on using their bodies for survival and dominance, with many cultivating fear to avoid being seen as weak. Karina, for example, became one of FARC's most feared commanders through her battle injuries—such as losing an eye—and her reputation of brutality, making her one of the highest-ranking guerrillas in the group.

Despite these challenges, women in the FARC received political education and public speaking training, opportunities rarely available to women in the broader Colombian society.

==== Regulations of relationships and motherhood ====
Furthermore, FARC sought to control sexual relationships between combatants, requiring commander approval for romantic pairings. This was intended to reduce disruptions to combat readiness and organizational cohesion. Female combatants were also forced to use contraception. Some girls, even aged 12 years old, had an intrauterine device (IUD) inserted. The organization also maintained strict rules about pregnancy, often forcing or coercing abortions or requiring newborns to be given away to other families. Leaders decided that motherhood was incompatible with guerilla life, fearing it would reduce the woman's effectiveness as a combatant and risk the lives of both the mother and the child.

== Human rights violations ==
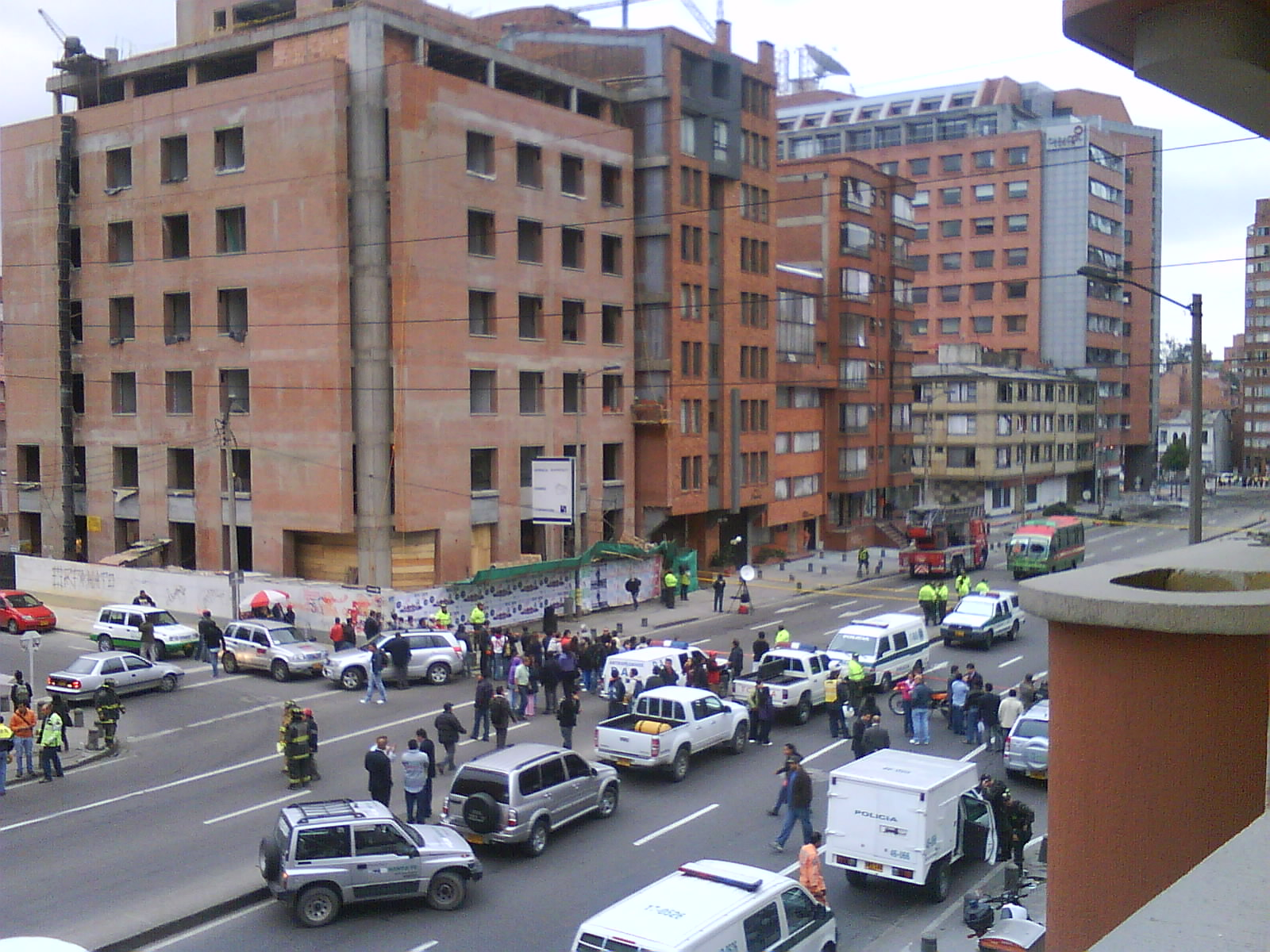
A 12 August 2010 terrorist attack by the FARC with a car bomb at the headquarters of Caracol Radio left 43 people injured.

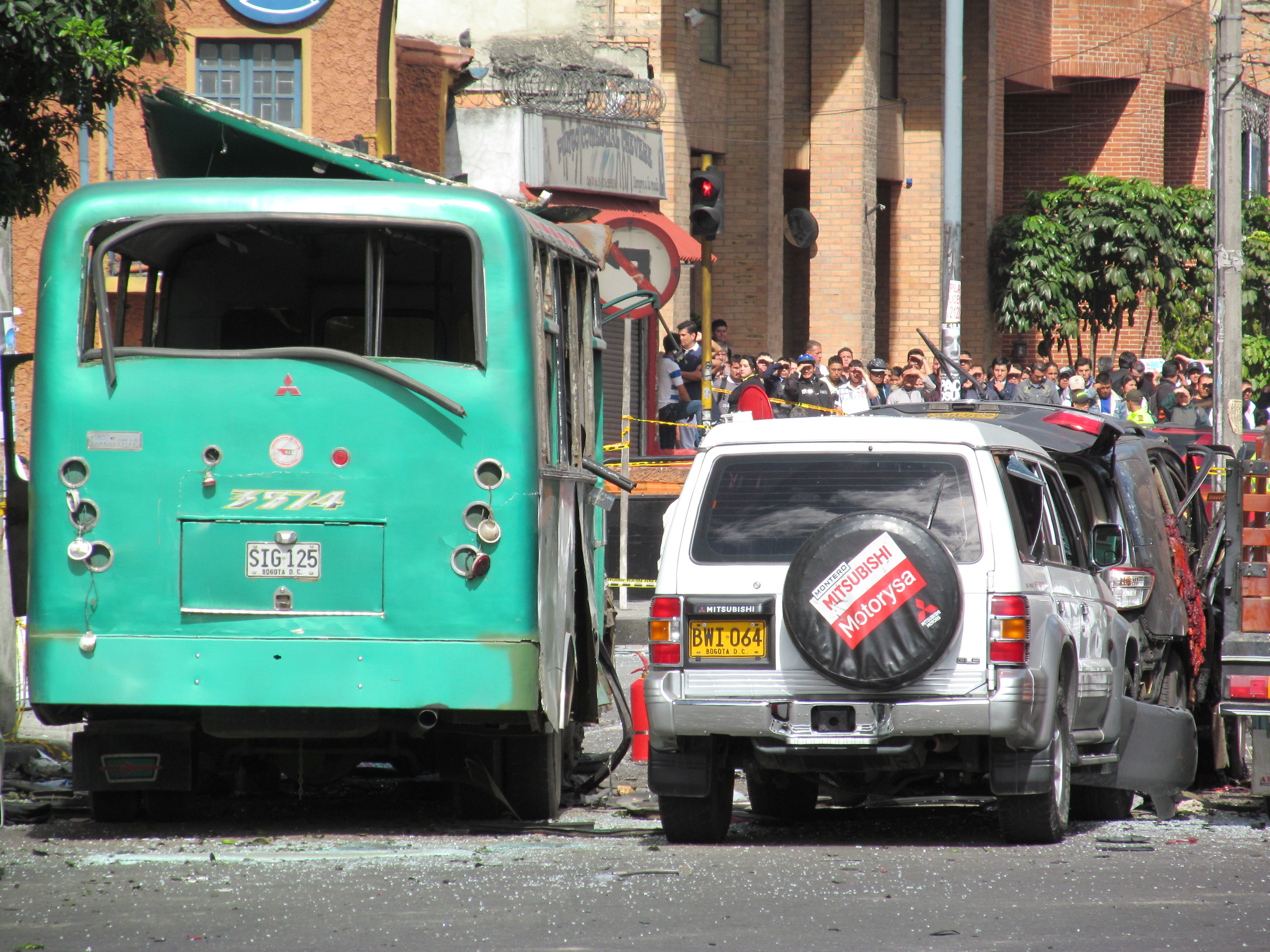
2012 car bombing targeting the former minister Fernando Londoño

FARC was accused of committing violations of human rights by numerous groups, including Human Rights Watch, Amnesty International, the United Nations as well as by the Colombian, U.S. and European Union governments.

A February 2005 report from the United Nations' High Commissioner for Human Rights mentioned that, during 2004, "FARC–EP continued to commit grave breaches [of human rights] such as murders of protected persons, torture and hostage-taking, which affected many civilians, including men, women, returnees, boys and girls, and ethnic groups."

=== Extrajudicial executions ===
FARC consistently carried out attacks against civilians specifically targeting suspected supporters of paramilitary groups, political adversaries, journalists, local leaders, and members of certain indigenous groups since at least as early as 1994. From 1994 to 1997 the region of Urabá in Antioquia Department was the site of FARC attacks against civilians. FARC has also executed civilians for failing to pay "war taxes" to their group.

In 2001, Human Rights Watch (HRW) announced that the FARC–EP had abducted and executed civilians accused of supporting paramilitary groups in the demilitarized zone and elsewhere, without providing any legal defense mechanisms to the suspects and generally refusing to give any information to relatives of the victims. The human rights NGO directly investigated three such cases and received additional information about over twenty possible executions during a visit to the zone.

According to HRW, those extrajudicial executions would qualify as forced disappearances if they had been carried out by agents of the government or on its behalf, but nevertheless remained "blatant violations of the FARC–EP's obligations under international humanitarian law and in particular key provisions of article 4 of Protocol II, which protects against violence to the life, physical, and mental well-being of persons, torture, and ill-treatment".

The Colombian human rights organization CINEP reported that FARC–EP killed an estimated total of 496 civilians during 2000.

=== Use of gas cylinder mortars and land mines ===
The FARC–EP has employed a type of improvised mortars made from gas canisters (or cylinders), when launching attacks.

According to Human Rights Watch, the FARC–EP has killed civilians not involved in the conflict through the use of gas cylinder mortars and its use of land mines.

Human Rights Watch considers that "the FARC–EP's continued use of gas cylinder mortars shows this armed group's flagrant disregard for lives of civilians...gas cylinder bombs are impossible to aim with accuracy and, as a result, frequently strike civilian objects and cause avoidable civilian casualties."

According to the ICBL Landmine and Cluster Munitions Monitor, "FARC is probably the most prolific current user of antipersonnel mines among rebel groups anywhere in the world." Furthermore, FARC use child soldiers to carry and deploy antipersonnel mines.

=== Treatment of women ===
Female membership of the group is around 30 to 40 percent and while FARC's official policy forbids sexual assault of any kind, female members have experienced rape, sex slavery, and forced abortions. In a 2011 Colombia Police report, 112 women had deserted FARC and reported instances of being forced to have sex with commanding officers which lead to the spread of sexually transmitted diseases as well as pregnancy. Members who became pregnant were forced to have abortions at any stage of gestation, with an estimated 80 to 90 percent of ex-FARC female members having had at least one abortion, some having up to four. The report also claims that girls as young as 13 were recruited by FARC to fill a quota of women because "The women are [considered] necessary to maintain the discipline of the FARC." In an interview with Reuters, Claudia Roa, who joined FARC when she was 14, told how she was unknowingly given pills to induce birth when she was 8 months pregnant, after which her child was suffocated to death. According to Roa, many other women faced similar treatment, but those who became girlfriends to commanders were awarded special privileges, including the right to have children. One Colombian newspaper, after reviewing uncovered FARC documents and speaking with investigators, estimated that 1,000 forced abortions occur each year in FARC camps. In 2015, the Colombian attorney general opened an investigation into 150 cases of ex-FARC women being forced to terminate their pregnancies.

=== Violence against indigenous people ===
FARC sometimes threatened or assassinated indigenous Colombian leaders for attempting to prevent FARC incursions into their territory and resisting the forcible recruitment by FARC of indigenous youth. Between 1986 and 2001, FARC was responsible for 27 assassinations, 15 threats, and 14 other abuses of indigenous people in Antioquia Department. In March 1999 members of a local FARC contingent killed 3 indigenous rights activists, who were working with the U'Wa people to build a school for U'Wa children, and were fighting against encroachment of U'Wa territory by multinational oil corporations. The killings were almost universally condemned, and seriously harmed public perceptions of FARC.

Members of indigenous groups have demanded the removal of military bases set up by the Colombian government and guerrilla encampments established by FARC in their territories, claiming that both the Colombian National Army and the FARC should respect indigenous autonomy and international humanitarian law. According to a 2012 research from the National Indigenous Organization of Colombia (ONIC), 80,000 members of indigenous communities have been displaced from their native lands since 2004 because of FARC-related violence. Luis Evelis, an indigenous leader and ONIC representative, has stated that "the armed conflict is still in force, causing damages to the indigenous. Our territories are self-governed and we demand our autonomy. During the year 2011, fifty-six indigenous people have been killed." The United Nations Declaration on the Rights of Indigenous Peoples has indicated that no military activities may be carried out within indigenous territories without first undertaking an "effective consultation" with indigenous representatives and authorities from the communities involved.

The Regional Indigenous Council of Cauca (CRIC) issued a statement concerning the release of two hostages taken by FARC in 2011: "Compared to past statements made by the national government, it is important to reiterate that the presence of armed groups in our territories is a fact that has been imposed by force of arms, against which our communities and their leaders have remained in peaceful resistance." The CRIC also indicated that neither the Colombian government nor the mediators and armed groups involved consulted with the indigenous people and their authorities about the hostage release, raising concerns about the application of national and international law guaranteeing their autonomy, self-determination and self-government. The indigenous organization also demanded the immediate end of all violence and conflict within indigenous territories and called for a negotiated solution to the war.

Official Colombian government statistics show that murders of indigenous people between January and May 2011 have increased 38% compared to the same timeframe in 2010. Colombia is home to nearly 1 million indigenous people, divided into around 100 different ethnicities. The Colombian Constitutional Court has warned that 35 of those groups are in danger of dying out. The Permanent Assembly for the Defense of Life and Territorial Control has stated that the armed conflict "is not only part of one or two areas, it is a problem of all the indigenous people."

== Organization and structure ==
FARC–EP was the largest and oldest insurgent group in the Americas. According to the Colombian government, FARC–EP had an estimated 6,000–8,000 members in 2008, down from 16,000 in 2001, and lost much of its fighting force since President Álvaro Uribe took office in 2002. Political analyst and former guerrilla León Valencia estimated that FARC's numbers were reduced to around 11,000 from their 18,000 peak but cautioned against considering the group a defeated force. In 2007, FARC–EP Commander Raúl Reyes claimed that their force consisted of 18,000 guerrillas.

According to a report from Human Rights Watch in 2006, approximately 10–15% of the recruits were minors, some of whom were forced to join the FARC. (Note: From the beginning of their training, both guerrilla and paramilitary child recruits were taught to treat the other side's fighters or sympathizers without mercy. Adults order children to kill, mutilate, and torture, conditioning them to the cruelest abuses. Not only do children face the same treatment should they fall into the hands of the enemy, many fear it from fellow fighters. Children who fail in their military duties or try to desert can face summary execution by comrades sometimes no older than themselves.) Women comprised around 40% of the guerilla army, according to data from the early 2000s; guerilla leaders themselves also gave a figure of 30–40% female membership. One of the factors that contribute to this high figure is the group's feminist outlook.

FARC was organized hierarchically into military units as follows:

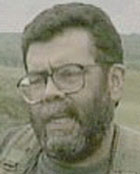
Alfonso Cano, former FARC Commander-in-Chief, killed by Colombian military forces on 4 November 2011

- Central High Command – composed of a five-member Secretariat (one of them being the Commander-in-Chief) and two "supplements". Coordinated the activities of the individual blocks, and determined overall strategy of FARC–EP.
- Estado Mayor Central – 25 members, who also coordinated the activities of blocks
- Block – 5+ fronts, with each block corresponding to one of Colombia's geographical regions: south, central, east, west, Middle Magdalena, Caribbean, and Cesar
- Front – 1+ columns. Within each front, there were combat, support, and infrastructure elements.
- Column – 2+ companies
- Company – 2+ guerrillas
- Guerrilla – 2 squads
- Squad – +/- 12 combatants

The FARC–EP secretariat was led by Alfonso Cano and six others after the death of Manuel Marulanda (Pedro Antonio Marín), also known as "Tirofijo", or Sureshot, in 2008. The "international spokesman" of the organization was Raúl Reyes, who was killed in a Colombian army raid against a guerrilla camp in Ecuador on 1 March 2008. Cano was killed in a military operation on 4 November 2011.

FARC–EP was open to a negotiated solution to the nation's conflict through dialogue with a flexible government that agreed to certain conditions, such as the demilitarization of certain areas, cessation of paramilitary and government violence against rural peasants, social reforms to reduce poverty and inequality, and the release of all jailed (and extradited) FARC–EP rebels. It said that until these conditions surfaced, the armed revolutionary struggle would remain necessary to fight against Colombia's elites. The FARC–EP said it would continue its armed struggle because it perceived the Colombian government as an enemy because of historical politically motivated violence against its members and supporters, including members of the Patriotic Union, a FARC–EP-created political party.

=== Territorial operations ===
The largest concentrations of FARC–EP guerrillas were located in the southeastern parts of Colombia's 500,000 square kilometers (190,000 sq mi) of forests and in the plains at the base of the Andean mountains. However, the FARC and the ELN lost control of much of their territory, especially in urban areas, forcing them to relocate to remote areas in the forests and the mountains.

Relations between the FARC–EP and local populations vary greatly depending on the history and specific characteristics of each region. In rural areas where the guerrillas have maintained a continuous presence for several decades, there are often organic links between the FARC and peasant communities. Such ties include shared generational membership and historical struggles dating back to the period of La Violencia. These areas have traditionally been located in the departments of Caquetá, Meta, Guaviare and Putumayo, and—to a lesser extent—portions of Huila, Tolima and Nariño. Within remote locations under FARC control and where the national government is generally absent, the group can function as a revolutionary vanguard and institutes its de facto rule of law by carrying out activities that aim to combat corruption and reduce small-scale crime.

The FARC had also been able to provide limited social services in these regions, such as health care and education, including building minor infrastructure works in the form of rural roads. Peasants who have grown up in areas under historical FARC control may become accustomed to accepting them as the local authority. The guerrillas also attempt to keep the peace between peasants and drug traffickers in addition to regulating other aspects of daily life and economics.

In other rural regions of the country, where a FARC presence had only been established within the last twenty years of the conflict and primarily remained military in nature, there was often a level of distrust between FARC rebels and the local peasant communities, which lack historical ties to the group. Civilians in these locations also tended to get caught in the middle of the conflict between FARC and its government or paramilitary opponents. In the populated urban areas where the Colombian state has maintained a solid historical presence, some FARC sympathies may have existed in the poorest neighborhoods and among certain progressive sectors of the middle class, but most city inhabitants tended to view the guerrillas as one of Colombia's main problems.

By the end of 2010, FARC–EP influence was significantly reduced in the regions where it had only carried out a recent military-focused expansion during the 1980s and 1990s, in part due to the failure to establish close social ties with local populations. Government offensives eradicated much of the visible guerrilla presence in northern and central Colombia as well as in Guainía, Vaupés and Amazonas, limiting FARC to clandestine operations. Similar military setbacks and retreats occurred even within its traditional strongholds, forcing the FARC to move towards the most remote areas, but there the guerrillas did appear to maintain popular support among the peasants that had developed organic links to the insurgency.

=== FARC dissidents ===
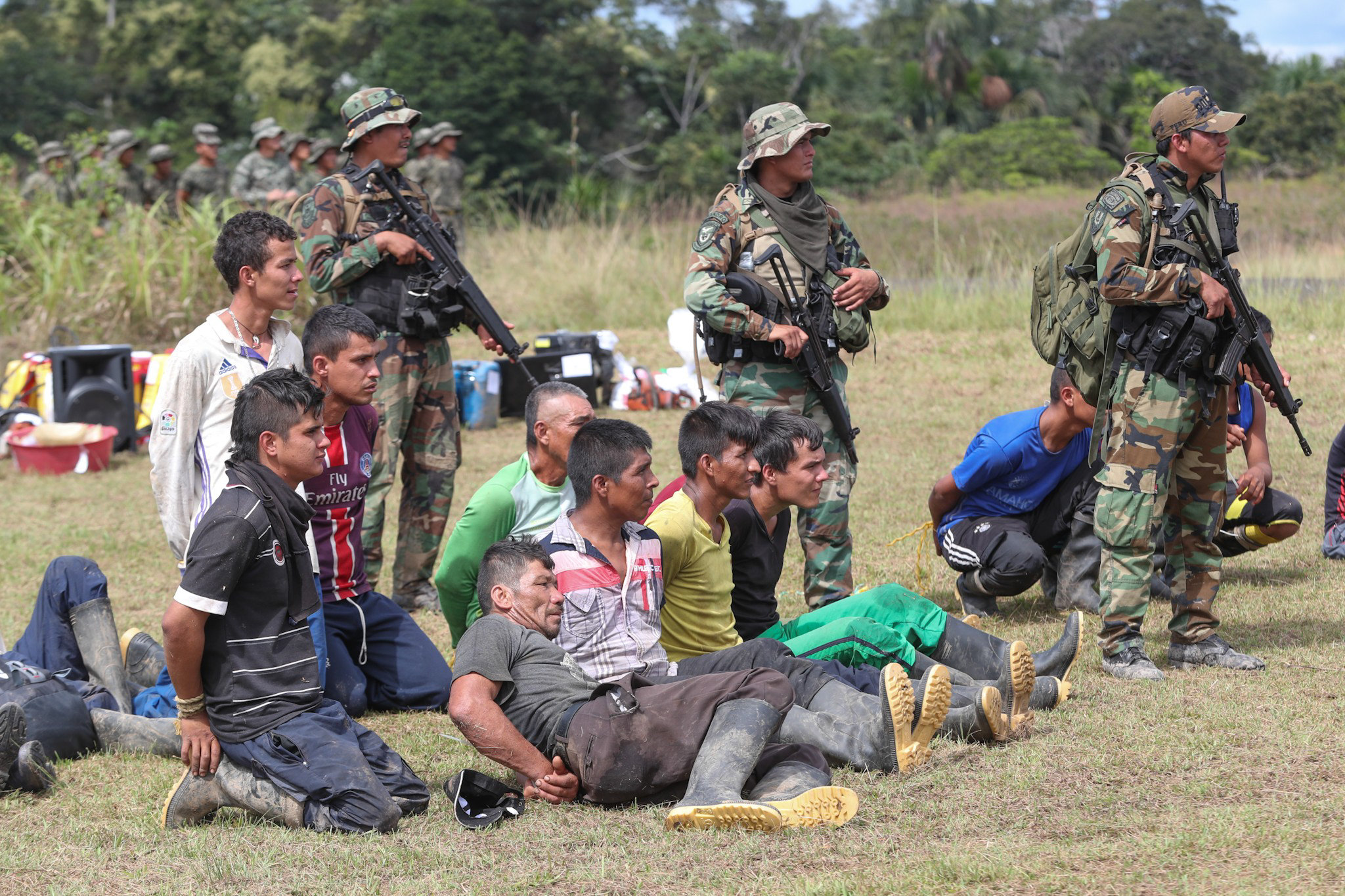
FARC dissidents arrested in Putumayo, Peru during Operation Armageddon

The FARC dissidents refers to a group formerly part of the Revolutionary Armed Forces of Colombia, who have refused to lay down their arms after the FARC-government peace treaty came into effect in 2016. The dissidents number some 1,200 armed combatants with an unknown number of civilian militia supporting them. The FARC dissidents have become "an increasing headache" for the Colombian armed forces, as they have to fight them, the EPL, ELN and Clan del Golfo at the same time. FARC dissidents are led by former mid-level commanders such as alias Gentil Duarte, alias Euclides Mora, alias John 40, alias Giovanny Chuspas y alias Julián Chollo. The FARC dissidents have been responsible for several attacks on the Colombian armed forces. Dissidents of FARC's 1st Front are located in the eastern plains of Colombia. John 40 and their dissident 43rd Front moved into the Amazonas state of western Venezuela. Venezuela has served as the primary location for many FARC dissidents.

On 15 July 2018, the Colombian and Peruvian governments launched a joint military effort known as Operation Armageddon to combat FARC dissidents. Peru issued a 60-day state of emergency in the Putumayo Province, an area bordering both Colombia and Ecuador. On the first day alone, more than 50 individuals were arrested in the operation, with the majority being Colombian nationals, while four cocaine labs were dismantled.

== International response ==
The FARC were a violent non-state actor (VNSA) whose formal recognition as legitimate belligerent forces is disputed by some organizations. As such, the FARC has been classified as a terrorist organization by the governments of Colombia, (since 1997) the United States (until 2021), Canada, Chile, (since 2010) New Zealand, and (until 2016) the European Union; whereas the governments of Venezuela (Maduro-led government), Brazil, Argentina (Cristina Kirchner and Fernandez-led governments), Ecuador, and Nicaragua did not. In 2008, Venezuelan President Hugo Chávez recognized the FARC–EP as a proper army. President Chávez also asked the Colombian government and their allies to recognize the FARC as a belligerent force, arguing that such political recognition would oblige the FARC to forgo kidnapping and terrorism as methods of civil war and to abide by the Geneva Convention. Juan Manuel Santos followed a middle path by recognizing in 2011 that there is an "armed conflict" in Colombia although his predecessor, Álvaro Uribe, strongly disagreed.

The FARC built a deep relationship with the Gaddafi government in Libya, throughout the 1990s and 2000s until the latter's overthrow in 2011. The FARC in 2000 requested a $100 million loan from Tripoli, FARC commanders were hosted in Libya and FARC soldiers were allegedly seen fighting for Gaddafi in the First Libyan Civil War.

== See also ==
- Eastern Bloc of the FARC-EP
- List of political hostages held by FARC
- Terrorism in Colombia
- Terrorism in Ecuador
- Comandos de la Frontera
