= Proof of Life =

2000 film directed by Taylor Hackford

- Theatrical release poster
- Directed by: Taylor Hackford
- Written by: Tony Gilroy
- Based on: "Adventures in the Ransom Trade" by William Prochnau; Long March to Freedom by Thomas Hargrove
- Produced by: Taylor Hackford; Charles Mulvehill
- Starring: Meg Ryan; Russell Crowe; David Morse; Pamela Reed; David Caruso
- Cinematography: Sławomir Idziak
- Edited by: Sheldon Kahn; John Smith
- Music by: Danny Elfman
- Production companies: Castle Rock Entertainment; Bel-Air Entertainment; Anvil Films
- Distributed by: Warner Bros. Pictures
- Release date: December 8, 2000
- Running time: 135 minutes
- Country: United States
- Languages: English; Italian; Spanish
- Budget: $65 million
- Box office: $62.8 million

Proof of Life is a 2000 American action thriller film directed and produced by Taylor Hackford, and starring Meg Ryan and Russell Crowe. The title refers to a phrase commonly used to indicate proof that a kidnap victim is still alive. The film's screenplay was written by Tony Gilroy, who also was an executive producer, and was inspired by William Prochnau's Vanity Fair magazine article "Adventures in the Ransom Trade", and Thomas Hargrove's book Long March to Freedom, in which Hargrove recounts how his release was negotiated by Thomas Clayton, who went on to be the founder of kidnap-for-ransom consultancy Clayton Consultants, Inc.

Proof of Life was released on December 8, 2000, by Warner Bros. Pictures. It received mixed reviews and underperformed at the box office, as it only grossed $62 million against a production budget of $65 million.

== Plot ==
Alice Bowman moves to the (fictional) South American country of Tecala because her engineer husband, Peter Bowman, has been hired to help build a new dam for oil company Quad Carbon. While driving one morning through the city, Peter is caught in traffic and then ambushed and abducted by guerrilla rebels of the Liberation Army of Tecala (ELT). Believing that Peter is working on Quad Carbon's oil pipeline, ELT soldiers lead him through the jungle.

Terry Thorne, a former member of the British Special Air Service, arrives in Tecala fresh from a successful hostage rescue in Chechnya. As an expert negotiator in kidnapping-and-ransom cases, he is assigned by his company, Luthan Risk, to bargain for Peter's safe return. Unfortunately, it is learned that Quad Carbon is on the verge of bankruptcy and takeover, and therefore has no insurance coverage for kidnapping, so they cannot afford Thorne's services. Despite Alice's pleas to stay, Thorne leaves the country. Alice is then assigned a corrupt local hostage negotiator, who immediately urges her to pay the ELT's first ransom demand: a $50,000 "good faith" payment. Not knowing what to do, Alice agrees, but the transaction is stopped by Thorne who (due to his conscience) has returned to help. He is aided by Dino, a competing negotiator and ex–Green Beret.

Over the next few months, Thorne uses a radio to speak with an ELT contact, and the two argue over terms for Peter's release—including a ransom payment that Alice and her sister-in-law, Janis, can afford. Thorne and Alice bond through the ordeal, and become intimate. They eventually negotiate a sum of $650,000.

Meanwhile, Peter has become a prisoner at the ELT's jungle base camp. There, he befriends another hostage named Kessler—a missionary and former member of the French Foreign Legion—who has lived in the camp for nineteen months. The two eventually attempt to escape but are soon tracked by the ELT. As they travel through the jungle, Peter steps on a trap and is unable to continue. Encouraged by Peter to flee, Kessler leaves him behind and later hears a shot fired. Kessler is shot in the shoulder by rebels and falls off a cliff and into a river. Kessler is found and hospitalized. Thorne's ELT contact subsequently refuses to respond to his calls. Luckily, one of Alice's young maids recognizes his voice over the radio and reveals he is a government official. Thorne confronts the contact, who confirms that Peter is alive, but because of the ELT's escalating war with the government and Peter's knowledge of the terrain, the ELT will no longer negotiate.

At Thorne's urging, Alice and Kessler convince the Tecala government that the ELT is mounting an attack on the pipeline being built through their territory. This forces the government army to mobilize, thus forcing a bulk of the camp's ELT troops to mobilize for a counter-attack. Thorne, Dino, and several associates are then inserted by helicopter and raid the weakened ELT base. They overcome the camp's soldiers, free Peter and another hostage, and then fly back to the city, where Alice happily reunites with her husband. Thorne and Alice share a final intimate moment before the latter departs with Peter on an immediate flight to the U.S..

== Cast ==
- Meg Ryan as Alice Bowman
- Russell Crowe as Terry Thorne
- David Morse as Peter Bowman
- Pamela Reed as Janis Goodman
- David Caruso as Dino
- Anthony Heald as Ted Fellner
- Michael Byrne as Lord Luthan
- Stanley Anderson as Jerry
- Gottfried John as Eric Kessler
- Alun Armstrong as Wyatt
- Michael Kitchen as Ian Havery
- Margo Martindale as Ivy
- Mario Ernesto Sánchez as Arturo Fernandez
- Pietro Sibille as Juaco
- Vicky Hernández as Maria
- Norma Martínez as Norma
- Carlos Blanchard as Carlos
- Rowena King as Pamela
- Diego Trujillo as Eliodoro
- Roberto Frisone as Calitri
- Gerard Naprous as Pierre LeNoir
- Merlin Hanbury-Tenison as Henry Thorne
- Aleksandr Baluev as Russian Colonel
- Said K. Saralijen as Chechen Rebel Leader
- Claudia Dammert as Ginger
- Tony Vazquez as Dr. Frederico De Carnedas / Marco
- Aristoteles Picho as Sandro
- Sarahi Echeverria as Cinta
- Raul Rodríguez as Tomas
- Mauro Cueva as Rico
- Alejandro Cordova as 'Rambo'
- Sandro Bellido as Mono
- Jaime Zevallos as Nino
- Gilberto Torres as Raymo
- Flora Martinez as Linda
- Laura Escobar as Cara
- Marco Bustos as Alex
- Jorge Medina as Berto

== Background ==
Although the producers wanted to film in Colombia, due to the dangers that guerrillas posed in that country at the time, the movie was mainly filmed in Ecuador. Tecala's geographic and urban appearance and its political characteristics were based loosely on a mix of several Andean countries.

The ELT's characterization appears to be primarily based on the Revolutionary Armed Forces of Colombia (FARC). Coincidentally, Colombia's second largest guerrilla group is the Ejército de Liberación Nacional or ELN.

Control Risks, a risk consulting firm, was hired to provide security for the cast and crew while filming on location. The firm also provided contacts for character inspiration for the kidnap and ransom consulting seen in the film.

=== Inspiration ===
The movie's end credits post-script says: "Inspired by the VANITY FAIR article 'Adventures in the Ransom Trade' by William Prochnau and by the book Long March to Freedom by Thomas Hargrove, whom FARC kidnapped and held for ransom in 1994. Twenty-one years after the release of Proof of Life, Thomas' son Miles would release his own documentary, Miracle Fishing, based on camcorder footage he took when his family and friends were negotiating with FARC guerillas for Thomas' safe return.

=== Tecala ===
The Republic of Tecala, where most of Proof of Life is set, is a fictional South American country. Tecala has long been the scene of an internal conflict between its government forces and the Liberation Army of Tecala (ELT). The ELT was originally a Marxist guerrilla group supported by the Soviet Union, but after the Soviet Union's dissolution in 1991, the ELT's primary source of funding fell through, and they began kidnapping people for ransom to fund their operations. A map seen in the film is that of Ecuador. The country's capital Quito was chosen along with the eastern jungle and the nearby city of Baños de Agua Santa in the Ecuadorian Andes.

== Release ==
The film opened in wide release in the United States on December 8, 2000, on 2,705 screens. The opening weekend gross was $10,207,869 and the total receipts for the U.S. run were $32,598,931. The international box-office receipts were $30,162,074, for total receipts of $62,761,005. The film was in wide release in the U.S. for twelve weeks (eighty days). In its widest release, the film was featured in 2,705 theaters across the country.

== Soundtrack ==
The score was by Danny Elfman. Several songs were written by Christian Valencia. The song "I'll Be Your Lover, Too," written and performed by Van Morrison, plays over the closing credits. The soundtrack was released on Varèse Sarabande.

== Death during filming ==
The film is dedicated to Will Gaffney, David Morse's stand-in who was killed on-set when a truck he was in went over a cliff. Morse was away at the time because of a family illness.

== Home media ==
The film was released on DVD and VHS on June 19, 2001.

== Reception ==
=== Critical response ===
Stephen Holden, film critic for The New York Times, did not think the film worked well and opined that the actors did not connect. He wrote, "[the film displays] a gaping lack of emotional connection among the characters in a romantic triangle that feels conspicuously unromantic ... what ultimately sinks this stylish but heartless film is a flat lead performance by the eternally snippy Meg Ryan ... Ms. Ryan expresses no inner conflict, nor much of anything else beyond a mounting tension. Even when her wide blue eyes well up with tears, the pain she conveys is more the frustration of a little girl who has misplaced her doll than any deep, empathetic suffering."

Critic David Ansen gave the film a mixed review, writing,

Taylor Hackford's thriller Proof of Life leaves a lot to be desired, but it's got its hands on a fascinating subject ... To be fair, Tony Gilroy's screenplay keeps the romance on the back burner ... Thorne is the most compelling aspect of Proof of Life, thanks to Crowe's quiet, hard-bitten charisma. It's a part Bogart once would have played—the amoral tough guy who rises to the moral occasion—and Crowe gives it just the right note of gravel-voiced masculinity. But neither Crowe, Ryan nor the topical subject keeps Proof of Life from feeling recycled. For all the up-to-the-minute research, the movie still gives off the musty scent of Hollywood contrivance.

Review aggregator Rotten Tomatoes gives the film an approval rating of 39% based on 117 reviews with an average rating of 5.3/10. The site's critics consensus reads: "Despite its promising premise and superstar cast, Proof of Life is just a routine thriller that doesn't offer anything new." Metacritic gave it a score of 45 out of 100 based on 29 reviews, indicating "mixed or average" reviews. Audiences polled by CinemaScore gave the film a "B" on an A to F scale.

=== Awards ===
The film was nominated for four Blockbuster Entertainment Awards; Favorite Actor – Suspense, Favorite Actress - Suspense, Favorite Supporting Actor – Suspense and Favorite Supporting Actress – Suspense. Danny Elfman was also nominated for a Satellite Award for Best Original Score at the 5th Golden Satellite Awards, but lost out to Gladiator (Hans Zimmer).

Award	Category	Nominee	Result
Blockbuster Entertainment Awards	Favorite Actor – Suspense	Russell Crowe	Nominated
Blockbuster Entertainment Awards	Favorite Actress - Suspense	Meg Ryan	Nominated
Blockbuster Entertainment Awards	Favorite Supporting Actor – Suspense	David Caruso	Nominated
Blockbuster Entertainment Awards	Favorite Supporting Actress – Suspense	Pamela Reed	Nominated
Satellite Awards	Best Original Score	Danny Elfman	Nominated

== See also ==
- Colombian armed conflict
- Kidnappings in Colombia
