= Corporación Nuevo Arco Iris =

Colombian non-governmental reparations organization

Corporación Nuevo Arco Iris (English: New Rainbow Corporation, CNAI) is a non-governmental organization for human rights in Colombia. Its purpose is to promote democracy, oppose corruption, and advocate for victims in the Colombian peace process. In 2016, Nuevo Arco Iris received support from other Colombian human rights organizations, like Unidad para la Atención y Reparación Integral a las Víctimas (Victims Union) during the 2016 Colombian peace agreement referendum..

== Overview ==
The Rainbow Corporation was created in 1994 as part of the final peace agreement between the Colombian government and Corriente de Renovación Socialista as the Colombian conflict and other tumultuous issues occurred. It supports the modernization and democratization of Colombia through peace and development of education, health, housing, employment and further economic initiatives.

Its president is León Valencia. Notable members include Fernando Cuervo, Antonio Sanguino, and Rodrigo Osorno. Most members are former Marxist rebels, notably from the National Liberation Army.

Fifteen employees have been killed in recent years. The organization is protected by 40 bodyguards. It has 200 employees, 115 of whom are former rebels. It is funded by Spain the Netherlands, the European community, the United Nations Development Program, etc., with a budget of half a million dollars. U.S. Ambassador William Brownfield has expressed moral support for the organization.

Its headquarters are in Bogotá, Colombia.

== See also ==
- Human rights in Colombia
