= Miracle Fishing =

Miracle Fishing: Kidnapped Abroad
- Directed by: Miles Hargrove
- Release date: 2020
- Country: United States
- Language: English

Miracle Fishing: Kidnapped Abroad is a 2020 documentary film directed by Miles Hargrove.
