= FARC files =

Documents seized from the Revolutionary Armed Forces of Colombia

The FARC files are computer files which were retrieved from a Revolutionary Armed Forces of Colombia (FARC) camp in Ecuador according to the Colombian government, during a Colombian raid into Ecuador which sparked the 2008 Andean diplomatic crisis. In May 2011 the Supreme Court of Colombia ruled the FARC files inadmissible as evidence due to their acquisition from abroad by the military (rather than by the Judicial Police), and in addition stated that the validity of the content could not be verified.

== Provenance and authenticity ==
The cross-border raid on the camp took place in the early hours of 1 March 2008. On the afternoon of 2 March 2008, in a short press release, General Óscar Naranjo, director of the Colombian National Police, as spokesperson of the Colombian government, announced that during the military operation on the Colombia-Ecuador border, several documents and three laptops had been retrieved along with the bodies of Raúl Reyes and one of his lieutenants. Copies of 13 documents were provided by General Naranjo to reporters on March 4. Eight electronic data sources (three laptops, two external hard drives, and three USB memory sticks) were later handed to Interpol on 10 March. During Interpol's press conference on 15 May, the Secretary General said: "The eight seized computer exhibits contained more than 600 gigabytes of data, including 37,872 written documents, 452 spreadsheets, 210,888 images, 22,481 web pages, 7,989 email addresses, 10,537 multimedia files (sound and video) and 983 encrypted files. In non-technical terms, this volume of data would correspond to 39.5 million filled pages in Microsoft Word and, if all of the seized data were in Word format, it would take more than 1,000 years to read at a rate of 100 pages per day."

=== Interpol ===
The Colombian Administrative Department of Security (DAS) reported that it had asked for Interpol's technical support in order to decipher the seized FARC computers. According to the DAS, Interpol accepted the request and sent several experts to Colombia.

The final report was presented on May 15. Interpol's report said that it found no evidence that the Colombian Government had manipulated the laptops, although the initial Colombian security force access to the data sources (between 1 and 3 March) did not conform to international standards. The laptops had been booted and hard drives or USB sticks were viewed. President Hugo Chávez dismissed Interpol's findings as "A show of clowns, ridiculous" given by a "gringo, aggressive, corrupt and vagabond policeman," about which "spending time on is not worthwhile." and threatened to revise (again) both its economic and diplomatic relations with Colombia.

On June 15, 2008 Interpol issued a new press release in response to a statement by Ecuador's Foreign Ministry that Interpol considered to be incorrect. The press release stated that "[Ecuador] inaccurately suggests that Interpol had not established whether the eight seized exhibits forensically examined by Interpol's computer forensic experts had been recovered by Colombian authorities on 1 March 2008 from a FARC camp or belonged to Raul Reyes. In fact, based on a review of all the information and material provided by Colombia, including a classified oral briefing, Interpol was able to satisfy itself, and clearly stated in its report, that the seized computer exhibits it was requested to forensically examine were taken from the FARC terrorist camp on 1 March 2008 and belonged to Raul Reyes." Interpol also added: "Validating that the contents of the computer exhibits were not manipulated after their seizure by Colombian authorities is not in any way, shape or form the same as saying that the contents of the user files are true and accurate. Interpol therefore objects to those who suggest that Interpol's report validates the source and accuracy of any particular document or user file contained therein."

According to an unnamed independent German computer expert consulted by Heise Online, there would have been a possibility of introducing potentially manipulated disk images.

=== Colombian Supreme Court ===
In May 2011 the Supreme Court of Colombia dismissed a case against Congressman Wilson Borja. The case rested on material from the FARC files. The Court ruled the material inadmissible as it had not been properly acquired by the Judicial Police, with the Prosecutor General's Office clarifying that "no other power in the country has the authority to bring evidence from abroad, even less when ignoring foreign authorities". The court also said that the validity of the content could not be verified, as the alleged emails had been copied into Microsoft Word documents and provided no indication of the sender or receiver. The ruling would affect a number of open cases where defendants were accused of FARC collaboration based on FARC files evidence.

== Allegations ==
The documents contained a letter from Reyes to the high command of FARC explaining that he had recently held meetings with the Security Minister of Ecuador, Gustavo Larrea, representing President Correa, who had indicated a desire to establish "formal relations with the FARC". In the letter, Reyes conveys the following information to the high command: the intention of the Ecuadorian government to replace police forces that do not accept the presence of the guerrilla organization in the area; the request for the release of a hostage, "perhaps the son of professor Moncayo or someone else who may increase political action"; and the decision of Ecuador to annul next year's license for the use of the Manta Air Base by the United States.

Also obtained were a series of emails from 2000 to 2003 between Reyes, Ortega and Libyan leader Muammar Gaddafi, addressed to "Comrade Colonel Muammar Gaddafi" and requesting a $100 million loan from Libya with the intent of using the money to buy missiles. Also communicated was a letter outlining Gaddafi's confidence in the FARC. After Gaddafi's death in 2011, Colombian president Juan Manuel Santos stated: “So, Gaddafi died and another supporter of the guerrillas and the narco-terrorism of the FARC and ELN died.”

Ecuador's Interior Minister Fernando Bustamante dismissed these allegations as "false". He stated that "We are not going to accept such a thing". He added "It is very easy to say something based on evidence that has not been scrutinized publicly or internationally."

The next day, another set of documents, allegedly indicating a relationship between the FARC and Venezuela, was released. According to Naranjo, the documents suggested that Chávez had given the FARC guerrillas US$300 million and was assisting the organization to obtain 50 kilograms (110 lb) of uranium. Óscar Naranjo also said there was evidence that Hugo Chávez had received 100 million pesos when he was a jailed for the 1992 Venezuelan coup d'état attempt. Some of the documents, along with photographs obtained from Reyes' laptops, were passed to the press. The Vice president of Colombia, Francisco Santos, claimed at a disarmament forum in Geneva that the FARC was planning to build a "dirty bomb", although he presented no evidence to back up his allegations. A message to Reyes subsequently found on one of the computers seems to indicate that the motive was to sell the uranium for a profit.

A letter from the FARC supremo Manuel Marulanda to the Venezuelan President was released on March 4. In this letter, Marulanda thanks the Venezuelan Government for its assistance in the war against the Colombian Government and the Álvaro Uribe presidency which was supported by the United States. FARC also offered their "modest knowledge in defense of the Bolivarian Revolution" in case of "a gringo aggression," understood to mean assistance against a possible military action from the United States.

=== Denials ===
Venezuelan Interior minister Ramón Rodríguez Chacín denied the accusations and stated that "They say that they find in that computer a letter from Marulanda to our commander in chief. Everybody already knows (the letters), the ones showed by our commander in chief. Pay attention, Venezuelan and Colombian people, how they manage the manipulation and deception, that kind of santanderist technique and now with fascism". Rodríguez Chacín also stated that months before, Venezuelan authorities had seized another computer, from the deceased narcotrafficker Wilson Varela, which in turn implicated Colombian police and General Óscar Naranjo in drug trafficking. "I deduce links of consanguinity and business between that general and that mafia capo to not reveal important information. Juan David Naranjo was one of his links and adjutants, brother of General Óscar Naranjo Trujillo." said Rodríguez Chacín. He added that he had not previously made the documents public "because of ethics". The affair that involved General Naranjo's brother in drug trafficking had been widely known since May 2006, when Naranjo himself announced it to the press.

The Colombian government stated that it would present the documents to the Organization of American States (OAS) to demonstrate that Venezuela and Ecuador were supporting the FARC, and thereby "violating international law against the harboring of terrorists". President Uribe stated that "our UN ambassador will announce that Colombia intends to denounce Hugo Chávez, President of Venezuela [to the International Criminal Court], for sponsoring and financing people that commit genocide".

On March 3, Ecuadorian security minister Gustavo Larrea admitted having met with FARC, without specifying where. Later that day, Ecuador's government announced it was in "very advanced talks" with FARC, seeking to free 12 hostages including Ingrid Betancourt. According to President Rafael Correa, the effort was thwarted by Colombia's military operation. The Colombian government rejected this argument, insisting that the captured computer documents revealed Ecuador to be engaging in "hostage trafficking for political means" and political gain, by suggesting that it would rotate military personnel on the border in order to allow the FARC to operate more freely.

=== Newspaper revelations ===
On March 4, the Colombian newsweekly Revista Semana published the second of two special editions following the death of FARC's Raúl Reyes, presenting some of the documents said to have been found on the computers seized by the Colombian government. The documents included several letters between FARC commanders and the Secretariat. On September 22, 2007, a clandestine meeting had been held between "a member or an emissary of the Secretariat" and the President of Venezuela in Caracas, as inferred from a letter from "JE" to the Secretariat. On April 8, 2007, a "Daniel" writes in a letter to members of the Secretariat Joaquín Gómez and Fabián Ramírez about a meeting with an associate of the drug lord "Chupeta", a man with "high acquisitive power" to carry out an exchange of FARC drugs for missiles. According to this document, Chupeta has "contacts" in Lebanon and his organization can handle the transport in two ways: via Europe or via Mexico. On October 4, 2007, Iván Márquez writes of a meeting with Rodríguez Chacín in which is discussed a meeting of Commanders in Venezuela (Fuerte Tiuna in Caracas, Valencia, Barinas or Trujillo), with security dealt with by Venezuelan military forces and organised by Rodríguez Chacín, an "expert on this kind of issues". If it takes place, "President Chávez will be accompanied by Presidents Ortega, Morales and Correa, which are patria o muerte." This meeting between Chávez and Marulanda became an issue following publication of these documents.

On October 8, 2007, details about secret meetings between Rodríguez Chacín and the FARC were recorded, dealing with a request for proof that Ingrid Betancourt was still alive. "He would be thankful if we send a record with the voice of the Colombian-French lady praising the intervention of him (Chávez) and Piedad." A document dated December 23, 2007 discusses the procedure for the release of two hostages in February 2008. It also refers to a request from the French President Nicolas Sarkozy to Chávez, asking Marulanda to receive his emissary Noe, whom FARC believes to be a French intelligence agent. Chávez asks for the release of Ingrid Betancourt, to which FARC responds: "we (FARC) said that if we release her, we would run out of cards".

A document dated January 18, 2008, records a meeting with Ecuadorian Security Minister Gustavo Larrea and a request for the release of Gustavo Moncayo's son. On February 8, 2008, a message from "Iván and Ricardo" to "Comrade Manuel" and the Secretariat, tells of a meeting with "Ángel" who had read a letter from "Manuel" and would send a reply, adding that "he (Ángel) has already readied the first 50 and has a time frame for completing up to 200 during the year". The letter goes on to mention possible business deals regarding the commercialization of a petroleum quota, or the sale of gasoline in Colombia, as well as "taking from the dossier, the creation of a profitable investment company in Venezuela". The document also mentions that President Chávez is willing to receive 47 guerrilla prisoners and 500 jailed guerrillas in his territory, and that he plans to create a sort of "Contadora Group," seeking to promote peace negotiations and the recognition of the FARC as a belligerent force. If they agree to his proposal, Chávez says that it would help to lessen the impact from a "manipulated march" against the FARC, and that he would be willing to promote "counter-marches" for peace and the Humanitarian Exchange in several countries. A document dated February 16, 2008, mentions a deal involving 50 kg of uranium, which was going to be sold at 2.5 million USD per kilogram.

=== Wider repercussions ===
On March 6, 2008 Viktor Bout, an ex-KGB agent turned weapons dealer, was arrested in a luxury hotel in Thailand during a raid staged by US DEA agents and carried out by Thai police forces. He was accused of supplying weapons to several militias in Asia, the Middle East and to the Colombian terrorist group FARC. Sources in Spain claimed that his arrest was made possible by information found on the captured computers, but this was contradicted by sources in Colombia.

The data found on the laptop computers included personal pictures of Raul Reyes and the guerrilla camp which was bombed in the attack. According to Colombian officials, this information not only corroborated some of their previous suspicions but also led to several important discoveries about FARC's inner activities and their entire international network. The information uncovered the way in which the FARC leadership was involved in several criminal dealings, including the deaths in captivity of the 11 Norte del Valle deputies, as well as ties with notable drug dealers and Colombian politicians. It led to the discovery of FARC funds related to Rodrigo Granda hidden in Costa Rica and to the capture of Rosario García Albert, a Spanish woman who was believed to be the representative of the guerrilla group in Spain and Portugal. On March 25, 2008, Colombian intelligence officers discovered 30 kilograms of impoverished uranium that, according to officials, corroborated the alleged deal mentioned on Reyes' captured computers. Some important Colombian figures, including Liberal opposition senator Piedad Cordoba, faced prosecution by the authorities in 2008 for incriminating emails found on these laptops. A Chilean government official offered his resignation after being tied with some of the documents found on these computers. The information that was uncovered related to the inner workings of the organization, its structure and channels of communication and was used to give the FARC its biggest blow, in an intelligence operation which led to the liberation of Ingrid Betancourt and three American contractors in July 2008.

During the diplomatic crisis caused by the 2008 unrest in Bolivia, the United States government froze the assets of several senior members of the Venezuelan Government: ex-Interior Minister Ramón Rodríguez Chacín, senior DISIP director Henry de Jesús Rangel and military intelligence chief Hugo Armando Carvajal Barrios, accusing them of "arming, supporting and financing" the FARC and their "killing of innocents", according to information discovered on Reyes' computers.
