= Valle del Cauca Deputies hostage crisis =

Victims of the Valle del Cauca deputies hostage crisis, 2007. Sigifredo López (bottom right) was the only survivor.

The Valle del Cauca Deputies hostage crisis (Spanish: Secuestro de los diputados del Valle del Cauca) refers to the kidnapping of 12 Deputies of the Assembly of Valle del Cauca, Colombia, on April 12, 2002, by members of the Revolutionary Armed Forces of Colombia (FARC) to pressure a prisoner exchange between them and the government and to negotiate the demilitarization of the municipalities of Florida and Pradera to initiate peace dialogues.

After a series of "proof of life" videos, on June 28, 2007, the FARC suddenly reported the death of 11 of the 12 kidnapped provincial deputies from Valle del Cauca Department. The Colombian government accused the FARC of executing the hostages and stated that government forces had not made any rescue attempts. FARC claimed that the deaths occurred during a crossfire, after an attack to one of its camps by an "unidentified military group". FARC did not report any other casualties on either side.

When Sigifredo Lopez, the only surviving deputy, was released on February 5, 2009, he confirmed that his colleagues were killed when the FARC mistook approaching colleagues for Colombian Army troops. He managed to survive because he was separated from his colleagues at the time as punishment for arguing with a guard.

FARC stated that their organization was willing to return the bodies to their families. The International Committee of the Red Cross was allowed to intervene by the guerrillas and the Colombian government. The efforts of the Red Cross recovery team were delayed due to difficult weather and terrain conditions upon arriving to the pick up area on September 5, 2007. The Colombian newspaper El Espectador speculated that the FARC also intended to give up the body of an alleged mercenary of the "unidentified military group" to prove their claims about an attack by such forces. On September 9, the ICRC announced that it had recovered 11 bodies and flew them to the city of Cali.

== Kidnapping operation ==
The FARC trained its guerrillas to act and dress as the military of Colombia to mislead civilians, politicians and members of the police. On April 11, 2002, the FARC mobilized its guerrillas to the Valle del Cauca Department Assembly in Cali riding in a bus and a truck. At 10:45 AM the guerrilla commando stormed the building dressed up as members of the Armed Forces of Colombia and alerting people in the building that there was a bomb threat.

The FARC ordered the 12 deputies out of the building and board the bus, while other guerrillas stabbed with knives members of the Colombian National Police who noted the false operation. One of the policemen died as a consequence of the stabbing. While on the road the 12 deputies were then informed that they had been kidnapped by the FARC to serve as aces in a possible prisoner exchange with the government.

== Hostages ==
- Sigifredo López Tobón (only survivor)
- Rufino Varela
- Carlos Barragán
- Jairo Javier Hoyos Salcedo, Vice president of the Assembly
- Alberto Quintero Herrera
- Juan Carlos Narváez, President of the Department Assembly
- Edinson Pérez
- Nacianceno Orozco
- Carlos Charry
- Francisco Giraldo
- Ramiro Echeverry
- Héctor Arismendy

== Timeline ==
=== 2002 ===
April 11
The elite unit of the FARC "Mobile Column Arturo Ruiz" kidnapped 12 deputies in Cali from the Building of the Valle del Cauca Department Assembly.

August 28
The FARC released the first evidence that the hostages were still alive.

November 15
After three months in office, President Álvaro Uribe proposed freeing and sending captured guerrillas overseas if they released all hostages.

December 3
FARC asked the government to demilitarize 115,000 km^{2} in the Departments of Putumayo and Caqueta to negotiate an exchange of prisoners.

December 27
FARC showed second survival video proof.

=== 2003 ===
April 28
FARC designated commanders Fabián Ramírez, Carlos Antonio Lozada and Felipe Rincón as negotiators for a prisoner exchange.

=== 2004 ===
January 24
FARC released a third video of the hostages.

July 23
Uribe offered to free 50 guerrilla combatants so that FARC would free the hostages. The initiative is supported by the French and Swiss governments.

September 14
FARC changed its proposal suggesting this time to demilitarize the municipalities of Cartagena del Chairá and San Vicente del Caguán, in Caquetá Department.

October 25
FARC released a fourth video of the hostages, most of it with messages for family members.

=== 2005 ===
December 13
The governments of France, Spain and Switzerland proposed both FARC and government of Colombia the demilitarization of 180 km^{2} in the corregimiento of El Retiro, municipality of Florida to negotiate the prisoner exchange

December 15
Uribe accepted the offer made by Spain, France and Switzerland.

=== 2006 ===
January 2
FARC exclaimed that a prisoner exchange with the Uribe administration would be "very difficult".

January 26
Foreign Minister of France Philippe Douste-Blazy met with the Colombian government in Bogotá to explore different ways to achieve the prisoner exchange.

October 19 and October 20
A car bomb exploded in a military installation causing no casualties. Uribe blamed the FARC and cancelled the offer to negotiate the exchange of guerrilla inmates for the hostages. Uribe then ordered a military operation to rescue the hostages.

=== 2007 ===
April 27
FARC released a fifth video of the hostages and the last one showing 11 of them alive. In the video the hostages asked Uribe for the demilitarization of Florida and Pradera municipalities.

May 25
Uribe announced a massive freedom of guerrilla inmates alleging "Reasons of State" including the notorious "FARC guerrilla chancellor" Rodrigo Granda. On June 4 it became known that the liberation of Granda was agreed upon a petition by French President Nicolas Sarkozy.

June 28
FARC announced the death of 11 of the 12 deputies in a "crossfire" with unknown forces. The only hostage survivor was deputy Sigifredo López who for security reasons was traveling with another group of guerrillas.

September 9
The Red Cross announced, after arriving in an undisclosed area using co-ordinates provided by FARC, that it had recovered 11 bodies and was returning them by helicopter to the city of Cali for identification and forensic procedures.

=== Government ===
After the kidnapping the government initiated military operations in the area.

== Execution "was a mistake" ==
According to email conversations between guerrillas, found on computers of deceased FARC-commander Raúl Reyes and quoted by several Colombian media, the murder of eleven of the abductees was "a mistake". According to one e-mail, the guards of the hostages executed the deputies when they mistook approaching fellow FARC-rebels for rebels of the National Liberation Army (ELN). "A big mistake that will cause us a lot of trouble", the e-mail says. FARC-commander 'Alfonso Cano' then allegedly ordered his troops to draw attention of military forces, so "the enemy" could be blamed for the killings.

== Deserter's testimony ==
On December 25, 2007, a female deserter from the FARC who was at one point guarding the hostages along with nine other guerrillas. Her mission in late 2005 consisted on guarding three of the hostages until they were relieved by commander 'Ezequiel', from the 'Daniel Aldana' guerrilla column.

== Alleged involvement drugs trafficker ==
Colombian television station RCN reported on May 21, 2008, the whole kidnapping operation was masterminded and financed by drug trafficker Wilson Figueroa Ordóñez, alias 'W'. The country's prosecution would be investigating Ordóñez' 2 billion peso payment to the FARC to finance the kidnapping. Sources within the General Attorney's Office denied the story to Colombian newspaper El País.

== Liberation of Sigifredo Lopez ==
On December 21, 2008, The FARC announced that they would release Sigifredo Lopez and five other political hostages to Piedad Córdoba as a humanitarian gesture. On February 5, 2009, Sigifredo Lopez was released.

After his release, Sigifredo López accused the guerrilla group of killing the 11 captives and denied that any military rescue attempt had taken place. According to López, the unexpected arrival of another guerrilla unit resulted in confusion and paranoia, leading the rebels to kill the rest of the deputies. He survived because he had been punished for "insubordination" and was held in chains nearby but separated from the rest of the group.

== See also ==
- Kidnappings in Colombia
- List of kidnappings
