= Lucía Andrea Morett Álvarez =

Lucía Morett
- Born: Lucía Andrea Morett Álvarez; May 24, 1981 (age 45); Mexico
- Education: Faculty of Philosophy and Literature (UNAM)
- Occupations: Student; Suspected terrorist
- Known for: Survivor of Santa Rosa de Sucumbíos raid
- Political party: Partido del Trabajo
- Parent(s): Jorge L. Morett; Ma. de Jesús Álvarez
- Relatives: Sonia Morett Alvarez (sister)

Notes
- Related to FARC and EZLN; Wanted by Interpol for extradition to Colombia and Ecuador (red card)

Lucía Andrea Morett Álvarez (born May 24, 1981) is one of three survivors of the bombing of Santa Rosa de Sucumbíos occurred on March 1, 2008 by the Colombian Air Force against the Revolutionary Armed Forces of Colombia (FARC), located in Ecuador. The attack caused the death of guerrilla leader Raul Reyes, the FARC members and four Mexican students, leading to a regional diplomatic crisis around Colombia's violation of Ecuadorian territorial sovereignty. She is currently wanted by Interpol for extradition to Colombia for an arrest warrant issued by the Municipal Criminal Court 32 of Bogotá in Colombia.

The Labour Party nominated her as a candidate for Federal Deputy for the election of July 5, 2009 but she lost, therefore lost immunity.

== Biography ==
Lucía Morett was 11 when she immigrated to Spain with her family where they lived for four years (1993 to 1996), until her father got a scholarship to pursue a doctorate from the University of Córdoba.

She traveled extensively with her sister and parents, mainly in Europe but also Africa and the Americas. She toured through Portugal, France, Morocco, Italy, Germany, the Netherlands, Switzerland and Czech Republic as well as Cuba. Back went to Texcoco. She attended high school at the University of the State of Mexico.

She worked at the Faro de Oriente, in a theater workshop for children. Along with her sister Sonia Morett Alvarez, (a graduate who now works at the Institute of Engineering at UNAM), has supported actions to promote the release of the Cerezo Contreras brothers, members of the FZLN, identified by the Mexican government as members of subversive movements. In October 1998, Lucía Morett was arrested by Mexican authorities because the two intercepted and shouted slogans against former Mexican President Ernesto Zedillo at a public event, where he demanded the fulfillment of the San Andrés Accords. They were released by a judge fined qualifier Texcoco. On August 26, 2004, participated in the march to the Interior Ministry to protest the death of activist Noel González EZLN. Both are supporters of the EZLN and part of the "Other Campaign" in the Federal District.

Lucía studied dramatic literature and theater at the National University of México (UNAM). She finished her studies and fulfilled her social service requirement at the Mexican Radio Institute (IMER) gathering information for the National News System, that was later broadcast through Radio Antenna news. She has a certificate of speech.

Later, she started working to write her thesis project, "The theater of collective creation in Latin America: two cases, Cuba and Colombia."

== Trip to Ecuador ==
In February 2008, Lucía Morett and four Mexican mates, traveled to Ecuador, where she visited the camp of Raúl Reyes on February 3 after she attended a congress of leftist Bolivarian groups where delegates from the FARC also attended and showed a video with a message from Raúl Reyes to those attending the congress, in Quito. Morett claimed that she had been in camp for academic purposes. However, on February 9, 2009, Colonel Mario Pazmino, former director of military intelligence during Operation Phoenix Ecuador, showed images that belie the claims of Morett according to which her visits to the FARC were academic. According to Pazmino, Morett would have been to other camps in the FARC.

== Santa Rosa de Sucumbios air raid ==
On March 1, 2008, Lucía Morett was sleeping on a FARC camp located in the town of Santa Rosa, Sucumbíos Province.

At midnight on Saturday was the Colombian Air Force aerial strike. Morett was located far from the epicenter of the attack, was wounded with shrapnel and bullets in her right buttock, leg, ankle and her shoulder.

The raid succeeded in killing Raúl Reyes, second-in-command of FARC, as well as some two dozen individuals present in the encampment, including the four Mexican fellow from Lucía Morett (Soren Ulises Avilés Ángeles, Fernando Franco Delgado, Juan González del Castillo and Verónica Natalia Velásquez Ramírez), invited to the camp after attending a Bolivarian congress in Quito.

== Newspaper articles ==
Following the events, some newspapers published a number of complaints against Morett.

These newspapers are The Chronicle (a Mexican newspaper), according to a sheet alleged that broke the bicameral National Security Committee of Congress, Lucía Morett is part of the "Coordinadora Continental Bolivariana Chapter Mexico," which was confirmed by Isa Conde.

The paper notes that Morett was part of the "Mexican Movement of Solidarity with the People Fights Colombiano", whose headquarters were a cubicle next to a cafe in the Cerezo brothers, linked them with EPR.

Also, in the Mexican newspaper, El Siglo de Torreón reported that Morett and several Mexican youths were being trained by the Revolutionary Armed Forces of Colombia on the site of the jungles of Ecuador that was bombed by Colombia.

== Statements by the Colombian government ==
Colombian government representatives have made statements on Morett. The Colombian former vice-president Francisco Santos Calderón said that the FARC are training Chileans and Mexicans. The words said from Brussels, Belgium were: "Do not forget that we already find pictures of Raúl Reyes in Chilean and Mexican boys who were being trained so they could return to countries we do not know for what purpose" .

== Statements from the Ecuadorian government ==
The government of Ecuador's President, Rafael Correa, said that Morett stay as a tourist injured by the bombing in Colombia. Although later when it became clear his involvement with the FARC leadership was asked to withhold for investigation. It was not because Lucía Morett had left the country in the direction of Nicaragua, invited by President Daniel Ortega for several months.

== Return to Mexico ==
Morett returned to Mexico City on December 4, 2008 accompanied by the deputies of the PRD party, Isidro Pedraza Chávez, José Antonio Almazán González, Aleida Alavez Ruiz. The arrival was greeted by a crowd at the airport which sought to protect her from any arrest attempt by the General Attorney of the Republic.

On July 9, 2009 the Office of Colombia took steps to seek the extradition of Lucia Morett accusing her of being part of the International Committee of the Revolutionary Armed Forces of Colombia and to develop activities within the National Autonomous University of Mexico (UNAM), for the guerrilla group according to several files found in the computers of the guerrilla leader Raul Reyes.

The circular issued by the Interpol on July 3 on Morett said: "Warning: a person considered armed, dangerous and violent." Morett expected results of the July 5 in Mexico to know if she was elected federal deputy in Mexico's Federal Elections 2009, which would give immunity to avoid extradition to Colombia.6 But because the outcome of the July 5 not favored and 32 municipal criminal court of Bogotá called the arrest warrant, Interpol red card against reactivated Morett.

With her potential immunity lost and knowing that she was a fugitive from justice, Morret chose to hide. On March 2, 2010 Lucía's father, Jorge L. Morett, publicly declared that she was hidden someplace in Mexico trying to avoid arrest and extradition.
