= Colombia–Ecuador relations =

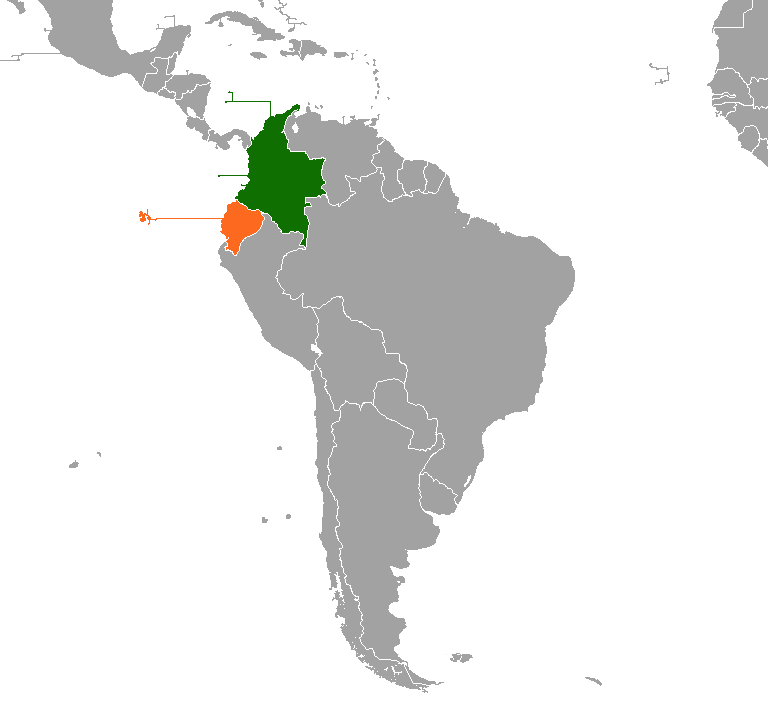
- Colombia: Ecuador

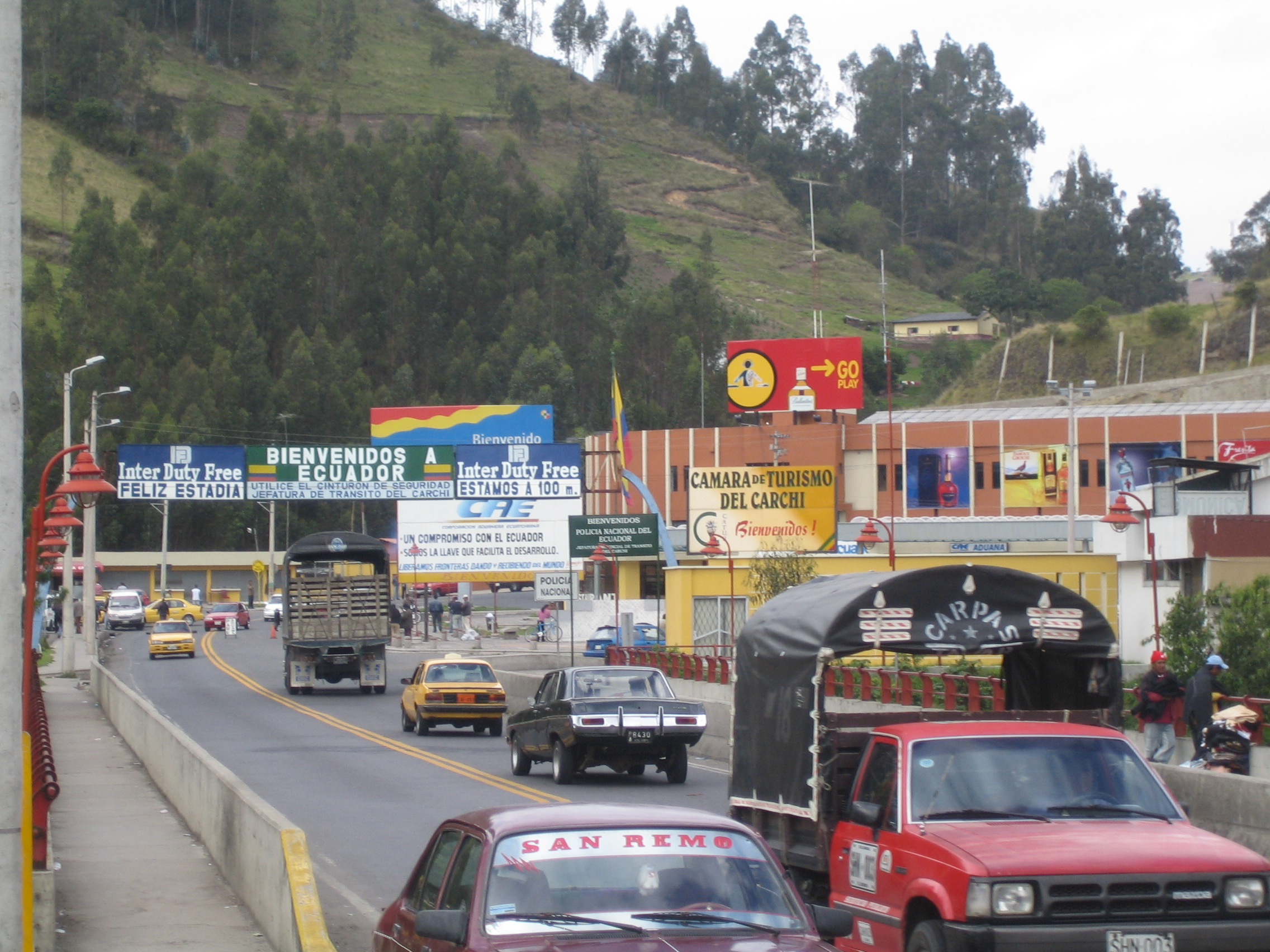
The Colombia-Ecuador main border crossing on the Pan-American Highway.

Colombia–Ecuador relations refers to the bilateral relations between the neighbouring Colombia and Ecuador. The present territory of both countries was part of the Spanish Empire from the sixteenth to nineteenth centuries. After the wars for independence against Spain led by Simón Bolívar, Ecuador, Colombia (then called New Granada), and Venezuela became part of the Republic of Gran Colombia in 1819. Both nations are members of the Community of Latin American and Caribbean States, Organization of Ibero-American States, and Organization of American States.

== History ==
Present-day Colombia and Ecuador trace back established official diplomatic relations to December 8, 1832, with the signing of the Treaty of Pasto, in which both countries recognized each other as sovereign states. The Ecuadorian diplomatic mission in New Granada (Colombia) did not open until 1837. It wasn't until 1939 that Ecuador raised the diplomatic mission's status to an official embassy. Colombia did the same the following year in 1940.

=== Andean diplomatic crisis (2008) ===
On March 1, 2008, the Colombian military launched an attack against FARC in the border area between Colombia and Ecuador, which ended with the death of some 19 guerrillas including the group's second in command Raul Reyes and one Colombian soldier. The attack targeted a guerrilla camp some 1.8 km inside Ecuadorian territory.

Colombian president Álvaro Uribe called the Ecuadorian president Rafael Correa, arguing that Colombian forces had crossed the border during combat in pursuit of the guerrillas. Correa said he would investigate the events and later accused the Colombian president of being either misinformed or lying to him. The accusation was based on the information provided by the Ecuadorian army in the bombed area, describing what Correa later called a "massacre". According to the Ecuadorian president, bodies in their underwear or pajamas were found in the guerrilla camp, indicating that they would have been sleeping at the time of the bomb raid and that there was no "hot pursuit" as president Uribe had informed him hours earlier. The Ecuadorian president decided then to recall his ambassador in Bogotá for consultations. The Colombian government subsequently apologized for its actions while accusing the Ecuadorian government of giving safe conduct to the FARC. The Organization of American States authorized the Colombia-Ecuador Good Offices Mission to promote the re-establishment of trust among the two governments through confidence building measures and prevent and verify any border incidents.

Reacting to the event, President of Venezuela, Hugo Chávez stated that if Colombia launched a similar operation within Venezuelan borders he would consider it a casus belli and verbally attacked the Colombian president. Chávez ordered ten Venezuelan national guard battalions to the Colombia-Venezuela border and closed its embassy in Bogotá. Chávez also offered his support to Ecuadorian president Correa.

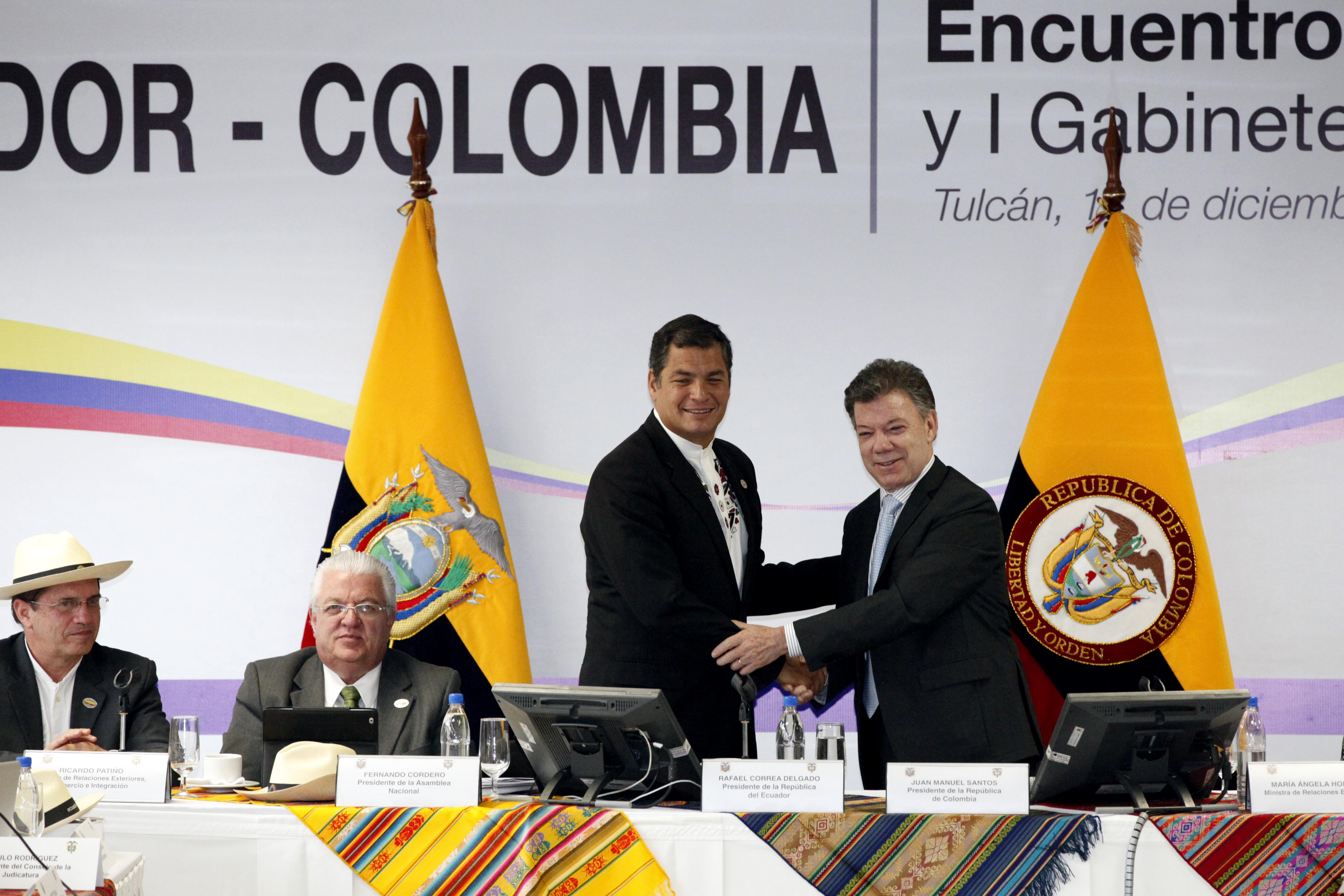

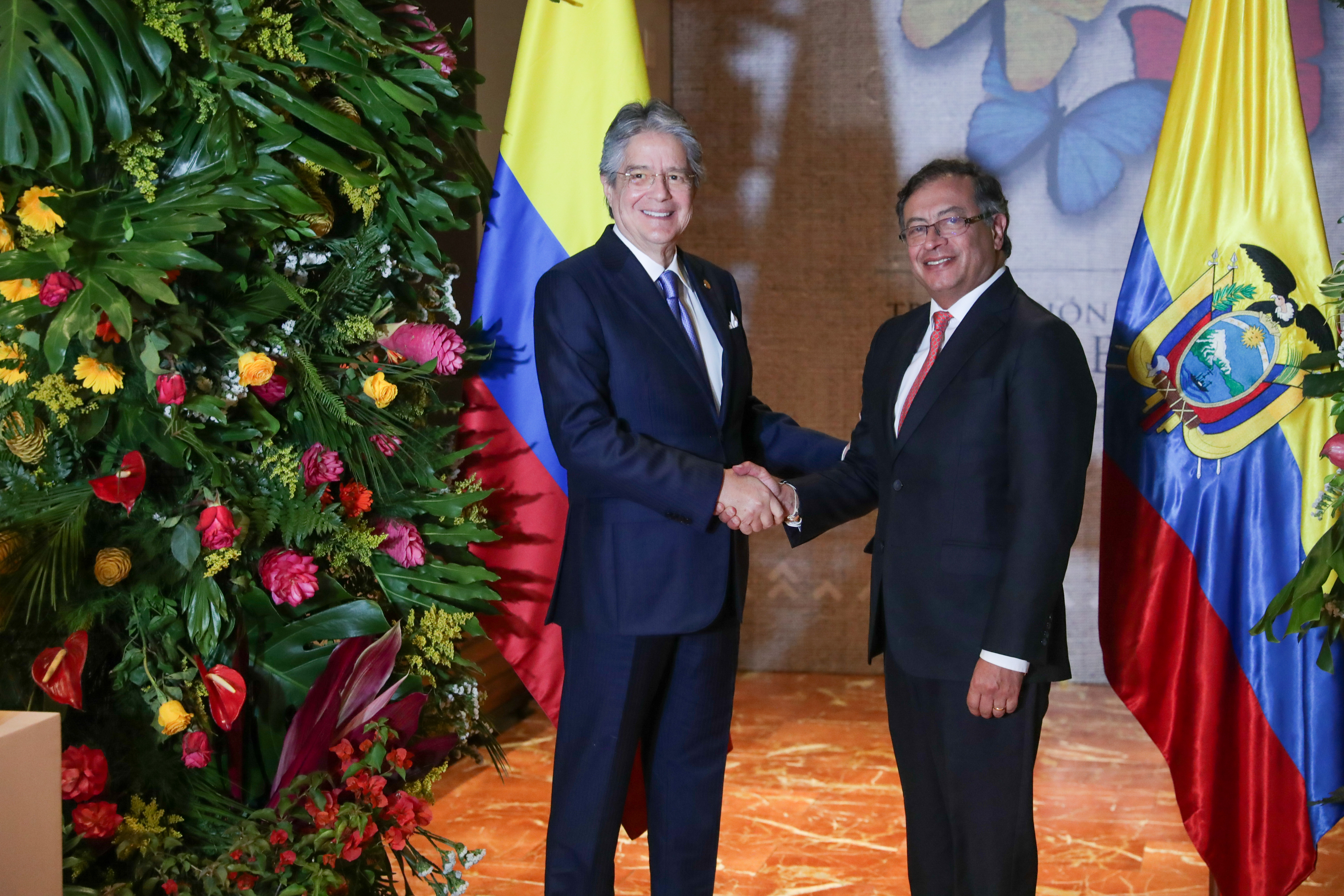
Presidents Guillermo Lasso and Gustavo Petro in 2022.

=== Suspension and restoration of diplomatic relations ===
As a response to the crisis the Ecuadorian government of Rafael Correa decided to end any diplomatic relations with Colombia, ordered the Ecuadorian embassy in Colombia to close and expelled the Colombian ambassador.

The Ecuadorian and Colombian presidents Rafael Correa and Álvaro Uribe agreed to restore low-level diplomatic relations at the level of Chargé d'Affaires immediately and without preconditions on June 6, 2008, following individual communications with and under a deal brokered by former U.S. President Jimmy Carter. As official diplomatic relations began to thaw, and the countries restored their ambassadorial exchange, social organizations and international assistance also began investing in grassroots peacebuilding and conflict resolution capacity building in the Ecuadorian-Colombian border region. The relationship between Colombia and Ecuador during the Correa and Moreno eras was shaped by bilateral trade, spillover effects from the Colombian conflict, and especially the flow of refugees from Colombia to Ecuador, and later the flow of Venezuelan migrants through Colombia into Ecuador.

During the presidency of Lenin Moreno since 2017, the relations between Ecuador and Colombia improved significantly. In January 2021, Ecuadorian President Lenin Moreno and Colombian President Ivan Duque made a joint statement on the good relations of the two countries.

== See also ==
- Foreign relations of Colombia
- Foreign relations of Ecuador
- 2008 Andean diplomatic crisis
