= L. Felice Gorordo =

American entrepreneur, investor and advisor (born 1982)

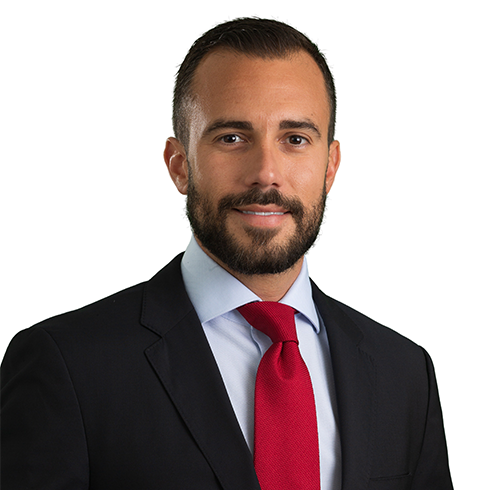
- Gorordo in 2021
- Born: Leonardo Felice Gorordo; December 1982 (age 43); Miami, Florida, U.S.
- Education: Georgetown University; Complutense University of Madrid
- Occupation: CEO of Embark
- Spouse: Bianca Ferrer Gorordo
- Children: 3
- Parent(s): Francisco J. Gorordo; Martha Gorordo Mohr (née Serra)

U.S. Executive Director of the World Bank
- In office May 10, 2023 – January 24, 2025
- President: Joe Biden
- Preceded by: Adriana Kugler

Leonardo Felice Gorordo is an American entrepreneur, investor and diplomat, and CEO of Embark, a management and finance consulting company. Gorordo was the United States Executive Director of the World Bank from 2023 to 2025. He is best known for his work on Cuba–United States relations through both advocacy and public service. Gorordo's career includes service in the White House under Presidents Barack Obama and George W. Bush, as well as an advisor to President Joe Biden's Cancer Initiative.

Additionally, Gorordo has held various leadership roles in the private sector, most notably as the CEO of eMerge Americas.

== Early life and education ==
Gorordo was born and raised in Miami, FL, to a Cuban-American family and attended Belen Jesuit Preparatory School. From 2000 to 2001, he was International Vice-president of Key Club International, an international service program for high school students in 38 countries. Gorordo attended Georgetown University and graduated with a bachelor's degree in government in 2005. He also studied at the Complutense University of Madrid in Spain. While in college, he was an intern in the White House Office of Political Affairs during the Administration of President George W. Bush. As a sophomore at Georgetown University, Gorordo co-founded (with a group of college students) Roots of Hope (Raíces de Esperanza), a non-profit focused on youth empowerment in Cuba through technology and entrepreneurship.

== Public service ==
Upon graduating from college, Gorordo served in the Administration of President George W. Bush as an aide to the U.S. Secretary of Commerce Carlos Gutierrez, and later as Special Assistant to the Director of the U.S. Citizenship & Immigration Services Col. Emilio T. Gonzalez. From 2006 to 2007, Gorordo was detailed to the U.S. Department of State and served in the Bureau of Western Hemisphere Affairs. He also was an advisor to the President & CEO of Jackson Health System. In 2011, Gorordo was appointed by President Barack Obama as one of fifteen White House Fellows. From 2011 to 2012, he served as the White House Fellow to the President's Domestic Policy Advisor Cecilia Muñoz, and worked in the White House Office of Public Engagement and Intergovernmental Affairs. In this capacity, he worked on Latino and immigration outreach and led the organizing of the first “White House Conference on Connecting the Americas. ” The conference included the participation of then-U.S. Secretary of State Hillary Clinton, several cabinet secretaries and high-level business and government leaders from throughout the Americas in lead up to the 2012 Summit of the Americas.

In 2021, Gorordo advocated for the passage of the Infrastructure Investment and Jobs Act (IIJA) and attended the White House bill signing ceremony with President Joe Biden. America Magazine reported that Gorordo was under consideration to be appointed U.S. Ambassador to the Holy See by President Biden.

As CEO of eMerge Americas, Gorordo has been instrumental in connecting Florida's major tech hubs of Miami, Tampa and Orlando in 2021 to work on a more open business environment for startup ecosystem building. In April 2022, in collaboration with the U.S. Conference of Mayors, Gorordo helped to organize a conference for mayors and private sector leaders to discuss the ways cities can benefit from digital assets and blockchain technologies.

=== World Bank ===
On July 18, 2022, President Joe Biden nominated Gorordo to be the U.S. Alternate Executive Director of the International Bank for Reconstruction and Development.

President Biden renominated him on January 23, 2023, to be considered under the new session of Congress. Gorordo was favorably reported by the Senate Foreign Relations Committee on December 7, 2022, and again on March 8, 2023. The entire Senate confirmed his nomination on May 10, 2023

Gorordo was the U.S. representative on the Board of the World Bank Group, overseeing the International Bank for Reconstruction & Development (IBRD), International Development Association (IDA), International Finance Corporation (IFC), Multilateral Investment Guarantee Agency (MIGA), and International Centre for Settlement of Investment Disputes (ICSID). In this role, his responsibilities included participating in the World Bank Board Audit Committee and Committee on Development Effectiveness, as well as overseeing operations and policy-setting for the organization's global workforce. Gorordo was also involved in reviewing and approving projects with annual financial commitments of approximately $130 billion in loans, grants, equity investments, and guarantees.

Gorordo has worked on initiatives to mobilize private capital and engage venture capital and private equity investors in supporting Sustainable Development Goals. He has advocated for human rights, including LGBTQ rights, stating that "LGBTQ rights are human rights, and human rights are LGBTQ rights." Gorordo supported Ukraine following Russia's invasion, working to engage the private sector in the country's rebuilding efforts. He has also engaged minority-owned businesses to participate in World Bank projects and programs, and has organized events at the World Bank focused on celebrating diversity and addressing issues such as racism and antisemitism.

In addition, Gorordo has supported initiatives to leverage new technologies and financing models to encourage investments in research and development, including efforts aimed at cancer research. As part of his role on the World Bank Board, Gorordo has conducted field visits in Africa, Asia, Eastern Europe and Latin America to assess Bank projects and meet with various stakeholders, including government officials, business leaders, and civil society representatives.

He stepped down as acting U.S. Executive Director of the World Bank in January 2025.

== Entrepreneurship ==
Following the White House Fellowship, Gorordo joined Clearpath, (acquired by L1BRE), a venture-backed tech company focused on revolutionizing the paper-based immigration filing process – just as TurboTax transformed tax filing. In 2014, he became CEO & President of Clearpath, which leveraged patented-technology to enable individuals to file their own immigration applications. He established partnerships with LegalZoom, H&R Block, and Univision, and successfully sold the company in 2016 to L1BRE. After the acquisition of Clearpath, Gorordo was CEO of L1BRE, a tech company with operations in the U.S. and Mexico. In 2018, Gorordo was named CEO of eMerge Americas, a venture-backed platform which seeks to foster innovation and entrepreneurship across the Americas, and transform Miami into becoming the tech hub of the Americas. In 2019, he led the organizing of the sixth annual eMerge Americas conference, which attracted more than 16,000 attendees and 400 participating companies from over 40 countries. Gorordo also served as co-host for AOL co-founder and Revolution LLC's CEO & Chairman Steve Case’s “Rise of the Rest” Tour through South Florida in 2019.

The South Florida Business Journal recognized Gorordo with the Ultimate CEO Award in 2023.

Gorordo also was a venture partner at private equity fund I Squared Capital.

== Advocacy ==
=== U.S.- Cuba relations ===
In 2003, Gorordo co-founded Roots of Hope after traveling to Cuba for the first time with the purpose of building bridges between young people on and off the island. He built and led a network with over 5,000 students and young professional members across 50 universities in the U.S. He also organized 10 youth leadership conferences at leading universities, including Harvard, Georgetown, Princeton, and Cornell. In 2009, Gorordo was an advisor to Grammy winner Juanes and helped organize the historic "Peace without Borders" (Paz Sin Fronteras) concert in Havana, Cuba, with 1.2 million young people in attendance. Gorordo contributed to the re-establishment of U.S.-Cuba diplomatic ties, and accompanied then-U.S. Secretary of State John Kerry to the re-opening of the Embassy of the United States, Havana in 2015, and President Barack Obama on his historic trip to Cuba in 2016 (the first sitting U.S. president to travel to the island since President Calvin Coolidge in 1928).

On July 11, 2021, peaceful protests occurred in Cuba, inspired by the song Patria y Vida. In the aftermath of these events, President Joe Biden invited a group of Cuban-American community activists, including Gorordo, to a meeting at the White House. The purpose of the meeting was to discuss the political situation in Cuba and explore ways to support the Cuban people in circumventing censorship and accessing free media and internet services.

=== Cancer Moonshot ===
In 2015, Gorordo and his mother participated in the pilgrimage trip to Cuba with Pope Francis, which led to her being blessed by the Pope and reuniting with her family on the island after 46 years. After losing his mother to pancreatic cancer, Gorordo became involved with then-Vice President Joe Biden’s “moonshot to cure cancer.” In 2016, he helped in the organizing of the White House Cancer Moonshot Summits. In 2018, Gorordo joined the Biden Cancer Initiative and led the organizing of more than 450 Biden Cancer Community Summits across the U.S. to focus national attention on creating actionable solutions in the fight against cancer. In 2018, Gorordo also was an Entrepreneur-In-Residence at StartUp Health, a venture fund and accelerator investing in “Health Moonshots” – like curing cancer – and building a portfolio of digital health companies in over 20 countries.

== Affiliations ==
Gorordo has appeared as a guest commentator on CNN, BBC, NPR, MSNBC, NBC Nightly News, Univision, and Telemundo. His views and articles have also been published in Forbes, Newsweek, The Economist, The Hill, The New Yorker, The Wall Street Journal and The Washington Post. He previously was Senior Fellow at the Georgetown University Beeck Center on Social Impact and Innovation. Gorordo was a delegate for the 2024 Democratic National Convention. He also was a member of the Biden for President National Finance Committee. Felice was a Lifetime Member of the Council on Foreign Relations and is on the Democratic National Committee's National Finance Committee, Latino Victory Fund National Committee, and the boards of the American Business Immigration Coalition, the Immigration Partnership and Coalition Fund and Baptist Health Foundation.

== Personal life ==
Gorordo is married to Bianca Ferrer and has three children, Catalina, David, and Marina Lucía. The Gorordos live in Miami, Florida.
