= 2008 Andean diplomatic crisis =

Stand-off between Ecuador, Colombia, and Venezuela

Date	March 1–7, 2008 (6 days)
Location	Colombia, Ecuador, Venezuela
Result	Diplomatic solution

Belligerents
Colombia; Supported by: United States	Ecuador; Venezuela; Supported by: Cuba; Nicaragua

Commanders and leaders
(Colombia) Álvaro Uribe	(Ecuador) Rafael Correa (Venezuela) Hugo Chávez

Map of Ecuador, Colombia and Venezuela

The 2008 Andean diplomatic crisis was a diplomatic stand-off involving the South American countries of Ecuador, Colombia and Venezuela. It began with an incursion into Ecuadorian territory across the Putumayo River by the Colombian military on March 1, 2008, leading to the deaths of over twenty militants, including Raúl Reyes (nom-de-guerre of Luis Edgar Devia Silva) and sixteen other members of the Revolutionary Armed Forces of Colombia (FARC). This incursion led to increased tension between Colombia and Ecuador and the movement of Venezuelan and Ecuadorian troops to their borders with Colombia.

A military and diplomatic row intensified, ambassadors were recalled and arrests made worldwide following the seizure by the Colombians from the FARC camp of laptop computers that the Colombian military found to contain a large quantity of letters and documents pertaining to FARC activities and its relationship with the Ecuadorian and Venezuelan governments.

The immediate crisis was ended at a Rio Group summit on March 7, 2008, with a public reconciliation of the three countries involved.

== Background ==
In 2007, Hugo Chávez, the Venezuelan President and Piedad Córdoba, a Colombian Senator, were acting as authorised mediators in the ongoing Humanitarian Exchange negotiations between the FARC and the government of Colombia. The Colombian President, Álvaro Uribe, had given Chávez permission to mediate, on the condition that all meetings with the FARC would take place in Venezuela and that Chávez would not contact members of the Colombian military directly, but instead go through the proper diplomatic channels. However, President Uribe of Colombia abruptly terminated the Venezuelan president's mediation efforts on November 22, 2007, after President Chávez personally contacted General Mario Montoya Uribe, the Commander of the Colombian National Army. In response to this, Chávez said that he was still willing to mediate but had withdrawn Venezuela's ambassador to Colombia and placed Colombian-Venezuelan relations "in a freezer". He also called Uribe a "liar and a cynic". President Uribe responded by saying that Colombia needed "mediation against terrorism, not [for Chávez] to legitimise terrorism," and that Chávez was not interested in bringing about peace in Colombia but instead, was engaged in an expansionist project in the region. From January to February 2008, FARC released six hostages "as a gesture of goodwill" toward Chávez, who had brokered the deal, and Chávez sent Venezuelan helicopters with Red Cross logos into the Colombian jungle to pick up the freed hostages.

== Incursion of the Colombian military into Ecuador ==
Angostura raid
- Location: Near Santa Rosa de Yanamaru, Sucumbíos, Ecuador; 00°22′37″N 77°07′48″W
- Target: Revolutionary Armed Forces of Colombia
- Date: March 1, 2008; 00:25 (UTC–5)
- Executed by: Colombian Armed Forces
- Casualties: 24 killed

In the weeks before the incursion, that is, the second half of February 2008, it was revealed that the Colombian government, with assistance from the United States' FBI and DEA, had wiretapped several satellite phones that were used by FARC forces in Southern Colombia. According to an unnamed Colombian military source, an international call made by Venezuelan President Hugo Chávez to Raúl Reyes, using one of these satellite links, was intercepted on February 27. The source claimed that Chávez called Reyes to inform him of the release of three FARC hostages held captive for almost 7 years. The intercepted call was used to track Reyes to a location in Colombia, near the Ecuadorian border.

Colombian troop movements from Cali to the border area began on February 29. Colombian intelligence reports had indicated that Raúl Reyes was expected to stay near Angostura, Ecuador, on the night of February 29, 2008. On February 27 and into the next day, several members of the FARC 48th Front were captured by Colombian security forces near the Ecuadorian border, taking away some support from the main group. During a subsequent operation, the Colombian Air Force stormed Angostura, followed by a Colombian special forces group and members of the Colombian National Police.

=== Angostura raid ===
On March 1, 2008 at 00:25 local time (05:25 UTC), Colombia launched this military operation, 1.8 kilometers (1.1 mi) into Ecuador. According to Colombian authorities, the guerrillas responded militarily to this initial bombardment from a position in the vicinity of Santa Rosa de Yanamaru, on the Ecuadorian side of the border, killing a Colombian soldier, Carlos Hernández. A second bombardment was then carried out, resulting in the deaths of Raúl Reyes and at least 20 more FARC members. Two bodies, several documents and three laptops found in the guerrilla camp were returned to Colombia. This was the first time the Colombian military had killed a member of FARC's leadership council in combat. After this operation, the Colombian authorities increased its security measures nationwide, fearing FARC retaliation.

=== Aftermath ===
The incursion took place in the vicinity of Santa Rosa de Yanamaru in Ecuador's Sucumbíos province

According to the Ecuadorian government, the attack happened 3 kilometres (1.9 mi) inside its own territory, lacked its permission and was a planned strike, intended to be followed by the incursion of Colombian troops by helicopter. It pointed out that the attack had left a total of more than 20 people dead in Ecuadorian territory, many of whom were found to be wearing underwear or sleeping clothes. The government of Ecuador concluded that the attack was a "massacre" and not the result of combat or "hot pursuit". Ecuadorian president Rafael Correa had reason to believe that the Colombian warplanes had penetrated 10 km into Ecuador's territory and struck the guerrilla camp while flying north, followed by troops in helicopters who had completed the killings. He claimed that some of the bodies had been found to be shot from behind.

The Ecuadorian authorities found three wounded women in the camp, including a Mexican student who was identified as Lucía Andrea Morett Álvarez. Lucía Morett claimed that she was visiting the guerrilla group as part of an academic investigation, refusing to answer other questions about the circumstances surrounding her presence there. Regarding the attack on the camp, she has stated: "I was asleep when we received a first aerial attack. Two or three hours later we were attacked again". Ecuador said that it was cooperating with Mexico to investigate whether any Mexicans had been killed during the raid. According to the director of the Ecuadorian military hospital which treated the three women, they had received some sort of medical attention from both the attacking Colombian forces and the Ecuadorian soldiers who later found them.

== Diplomatic developments ==
On Saturday, March 1, Álvaro Uribe said a few hours after the operation that "today we have taken another step against terrorism, which does not respect borders" and added that he took full responsibility for the operation. Colombia's violation of Ecuadorian sovereignty, however, led to increased tensions between Colombia and most other South American states.

=== Initial Ecuadorian response ===
President Uribe of Colombia spoke by telephone with his Ecuadorian counterpart, Rafael Correa, early on the morning of the raid, to inform him of the incident. In a press conference that evening, Correa denounced the attack as "aggression" against Ecuador, calling it a "massacre," and claiming that the rebels had been killed in their sleep using "advanced technology". He announced that he was summoning his ambassador in Colombia for consultations. On Sunday, March 2, Correa said that a diplomatic note would be sent in protest at the incursion, claiming that the action had been a violation of Ecuador's airspace. Ecuador formally recalled its ambassador from Colombia and expelled the Colombian ambassador from Quito.

=== Initial Venezuelan response ===
Venezuelan president Hugo Chávez called the attack "a cowardly murder" and reacted by closing his country's embassy in Colombia and moving troops to positions near to Venezuela's border with Colombia. On the television programme Aló Presidente, Chavez denounced President Uribe as "a liar" and "a lackey of North American Imperialism," claimed that Colombia was seeking to become "the Latin American equivalent of Israel," and compared Colombia's actions with Israel Defense Forces strikes on Palestinian militants. The Colombian government announced that it would not mobilise any troops in response to Hugo Chávez's order to move 10 battalions towards the frontier and would not respond to the accusations made by Chávez on his weekly TV program.

=== Colombian justification ===
Colombian foreign minister Fernando Araújo Perdomo apologized to Ecuador for "the action that we were forced to take in the border zone". He added that Colombia had "never had the intention or disposition to be disrespectful of, or to violate the sovereignty or integrity of the sister republic of Ecuador". The Colombian foreign ministry affirmed, however, that Raúl Reyes had "directed, for many years, criminal operations in the southern part of our country, covertly, from Ecuadorian territory, without the approval of its government". Colombia said that it was ready "to compensate any Ecuadorian citizens that could have been affected".

The Colombian National Police also held a press conference, at which it revealed a series of documents taken from the guerillas, which allegedly implicated both Venezuela and Ecuador in FARC activities (see below).

FARC had kidnapped hundreds of people, and sought to exchange some 40 hostages for 500 guerilla members held in Colombian prisons. A FARC spokesmen announced that Raúl Reyes's death "should not affect the search for a humanitarian agreement on the exchange of kidnapped people." He added that "We encourage revolutionary firmness, not to forego any effort that supports a humanitarian exchange, and to continue in our intentions for peace and construction of an effective democracy, with social justice." Colombian officials replied that kidnapping does not encourage peace, and kidnapping democratically elected officials does not encourage democracy.

=== Mutual accusations ===
On 3 March, a statement from Venezuela's foreign ministry announced the decision to expel Colombia's ambassador and all diplomatic staff at the Colombian embassy in Caracas. Authorities in Venezuela also restricted traffic at two major border crossings with Colombia, according to Isidoro Teres, president of the Chamber of Industry and Commerce for the Táchira State border town of Ureña. On the same day, Ecuador's Foreign Ministry issued a statement explaining its cutting off of diplomatic ties with Colombia. It said that President Uribe of Colombia had given misleading information while Ecuadorian forces were attempting to verify events on the border, and that the Colombian forces had been "trying to buy time" to return to Colombia after attacking the FARC camp. The Ecuadorian government stated it had intercepted communications showing this to be the case and that the Colombian forces knew they had entered Ecuador.

The Colombian Minister of Defense Juan Manuel Santos responded by saying that the operation of Colombian troops could have been avoided had there been better cooperation from Quito. "If we had real collaboration from Ecuador in pursuing these groups, these situations wouldn't occur, but we've never had it. They always have taken the position that they do not want to interfere in the Colombian conflict," said Santos.

At a press conference on 4 March, President Uribe announced that Colombia intended to bring charges against the Venezuelan president at the International Criminal Court, for funding terrorism and genocide. Later that day, Venezuela's Minister for Land and Agriculture, Elías Jaua, told the state broadcaster VTV that Venezuela was closing its border with Colombia. On March 5, President Chávez of Venezuela called the Colombian raid a "war crime," and joined Ecuador's president Rafael Correa in demanding international condemnation of the cross-border attack. In a ten-hour emergency meeting of the Permanent Council of the Organization of American States on the afternoon March 4, Ecuador urged the OAS to condemn Colombia's violation of its territorial integrity. Colombia, in response, insisted that the hemispheric body should instead roundly condemn terrorism and its funding. Due to disagreements regarding its content, the Council was unable to produce a final declaration on the matter. It did, however, agree to reconvene on March 5 to continue the debate, to convene a meeting of consultation of the member states' foreign ministers on March 17, and to set up a commission to investigate the incident. The Ecuadorian government also appointed a Commission for Transparency and Truth to investigate the incident, which later produced a report providing new details about the attack, and alleging that strategic intelligence from the U.S. military base in Manta, Ecuador may have been used during the Angostura attack. The report also criticized the communication and institutional command structure of the Ecuadorian police and military as failing to keep civilian leaders sufficiently informed of intelligence and facts on the ground before the attack.

In Brazil, on a five-nation tour to drum up support for his country's position, President Correa said Ecuador would re-establish diplomatic relations with Colombia only "in the very improbable circumstance" that that country offered an unrestricted apology, gave assurances that no similar incidents would take place in the future and retracted its allegations of ties between Quito and the FARC. He also emphasized that had any Ecuadorians died in the attack, "we would already be at war."

== Venezuelan and Ecuadorian troop movements ==
Venezuelan president Hugo Chávez had already moved troops near to the border with Colombia, warning that a Colombian incursion into Venezuela would be a "cause for war". Chávez announced that he had put the Venezuelan military on high alert, pledging that Venezuela would "back Ecuador in whatever circumstance". Ecuador also ordered troops to its borders. The Colombian government announced that it would not mobilize any troops in response to Hugo Chávez's order to move 10 battalions towards their common border.

On 6 March, the OAS criticised, but did not go so far as to condemn, the Colombian incursion into Ecuador. The OAS resolution called on Secretary General José Miguel Insulza to form a commission to investigate the incident on both sides of the border, as well as to help resolve the diplomatic crisis. Later that day, President Daniel Ortega of Nicaragua, which was already in a territorial dispute with Colombia over San Andrés and Providencia, announced the breaking of diplomatic relations with Colombia. Meanwhile, Hugo Chávez threatened to nationalise Colombian assets in Venezuela, saying, "We're not interested in Colombian investments here."

== FARC files ==
During the raid, the Colombian military recovered three laptops, two external hard disks, and three USB thumb drives. The material implicated governmental officials in Venezuela and Ecuador of supporting the FARC. The Colombian Administrative Department of Security (DAS) requested Interpol's technical support in order to decipher the seized FARC computers. Interpol accepted the request and sent several experts to Colombia. Interpol's report stated that it found no evidence that the Colombian Government had manipulated or tampered with the material but would not comment on the contents.

== Rio Group summit ==
On 5 March, Colombian authorities reiterated their commitment to the maintenance of peace in the region, announcing that none of its troops would be deployed near its borders.

On 7 March, at a Rio Group summit held in Santo Domingo in the Dominican Republic, the presidents of Colombia, Ecuador, Venezuela and Nicaragua publicly shook hands, in a show of goodwill. The handshakes, broadcast live throughout Latin America, appeared to be a signal that the period of military threats and diplomatic recriminations was over. After the summit, Ortega said he would re-establish diplomatic ties with Colombia.

== International reaction ==
=== Communities and organizations ===
- Organization of American States' Secretary General José Miguel Insulza noted the "seriousness of the situation" and emphasised "dialogue as the sole mechanism of negotiation". He also expressed his hope that the emergency meeting of the OAS Permanent Council called for March 4 would enable a "peaceful solution to this crisis". On 6 March, an OAS resolution stated that the Colombian incursion was a violation of Ecuadorian sovereignty, stopping short of condemning the Colombian government for the operation. The Organization of American States authorized the Colombia-Ecuador Good Offices Mission to promote the re-establishment of trust among the two governments through confidence building measures and to prevent and verify any border incidents.
- United Nations: Secretary-General Ban Ki-moon expressed concern over the tensions and called for restraint on all sides.
- European Union: Javier Solana, High Representative for the Common Foreign and Security Policy, asked Álvaro Uribe to remain "calm, contained and moderate in his messages." Uribe contacted the EU's head diplomat to explain to him the details surrounding the crisis. Colombian Vice-President Francisco Santos Calderón met with Solana in Brussels on March 5.

=== Americas ===
- Argentina: Foreign Minister Jorge Taiana said the country would lodge a protest at the Colombian incursion at an emergency meeting of the OAS and that Argentina was working to coordinate positions with other countries in the region.
- Brazil: Foreign Minister Celso Amorim condemned Colombia's violation of Ecuador's territory as "very serious" and asked Colombia to offer a "more explicit apology" to "help contain the crisis." Brazil had previously said that it would help to resolve the conflict, which "is beginning to destabilise regional relations" according to Marco Aurélio Garcia, foreign policy advisor to President Luiz Inacio Lula da Silva. Garcia told CBN radio that "we are mobilizing all of Brazil's diplomatic resources and those of other South American capitals to find a lasting solution."
- Bolivia: President Evo Morales said that the conflict could seriously affect the Union of South American Nations (Unasur) consolidation process. Morales also said he had called a special meeting of the Unasur Council of Foreign Ministers to discuss the Colombia-Ecuador diplomatic crisis on the sidelines of a Rio Group meeting in the Dominican Republic.
- Chile: President Michelle Bachelet demanded an explanation from Colombia as to why its troops had entered Ecuador, adding that: "The most important thing today is that we can avoid an escalation of this conflict."
- Cuba: Former President Fidel Castro, writing in the Communist Party newspaper Granma, blamed the United States for the dispute, saying it was a consequence of the "genocidal plans of the Yankee empire."
- Mexico: president Felipe Calderón spoke to both Correa and Uribe on Sunday, March 2, 2008 and offered his government's support for any efforts they might undertake for the prompt normalization of relations. On March 6, Calderón criticised Colombia's raid saying that Mexico rejects "any action that constitutes a violation of territorial sovereignty."
- Nicaragua: President Daniel Ortega condemned the killing of Reyes, saying that president Álvaro Uribe had "killed the possibilities for peace in Colombia." On 6 March 2008, Nicaragua broke off diplomatic relations with Colombia, following its ally Ecuador. Ortega stated: "We are not breaking relations with the Colombian people. We are breaking relations with the terrorist policy practiced by Álvaro Uribe's government".
- Peru: President Alan García condemned the violation of Ecuador's sovereignty, saying that it was "unacceptable", and called for the Organization of American States to set up guidelines for anti-terrorism measures.
- Suriname: Vice President Ram Sardjoe stated that their government had good relations with Colombia, Venezuela and Ecuador and that they considered this an internal matter for these three countries. He added that Suriname was willing to assist the countries.
- Uruguay: The Ministry of Foreign Relations released a statement on March 3, 2008 that urged the three countries to set talks in order to solve the disagreements, and not to take any further action that might worsen the situation.
- United States: The Bush administration supported Colombia's position, criticised Chávez and asked for a diplomatic solution while offering assistance to Colombia in case of military action and urged Congress for FTA approval. The major candidates in the November 2008 presidential election also supported Colombia. US Southern Command downplayed the possibility of an armed confrontation between Colombia and Venezuela or Colombia and Ecuador.

=== Asia ===
- Israel: Ambassador in Argentina, Rafael Eldad, in response to the Venezuelan president's claim that Colombia was becoming "the Latin American equivalent of Israel", said that Hugo Chávez was "introducing the culture of hatred into Latin America" and called for messages of peace and calm for the region.

=== Europe ===
- France: Called for restraint on all sides and the continuation of negotiations to free the FARC hostages. Foreign Minister Bernard Kouchner stated that the killing of Raúl Reyes was "bad news", because of his role as France's contact to obtain the release of Ingrid Betancourt. French President Nicolas Sarkozy told the Colombian news channel RCN TV that he had asked Manuel Marulanda "Tirofijo", the main FARC leader, to release Betancourt. If she died, he said, the FARC would never be taken off the international terrorist lists.
- Spain: Minister of Foreign Affairs Miguel Ángel Moratinos expressed his concern over the diplomatic crisis and called on all parties to remain "calm and to resolve their differences through dialogue and diplomacy, neighbourly cooperation and good faith".
- Italy: Minister of Foreign Affairs Massimo D’Alema condemned the Colombian military intervention and expressed his concern about the political deadlock. He released a statement declaring that “this unilateral operation jeopardizes the challenge to open an diplomatic dialogue” and doing so “it has caused serious strains in Latin America”.

== Key individuals ==
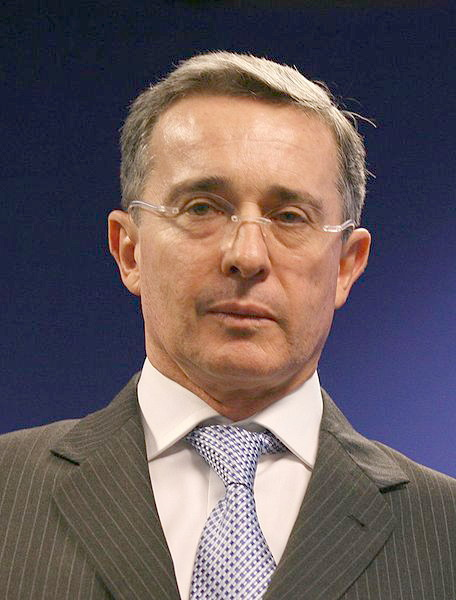
(Colombia) then-Colombian President Álvaro Uribe

== Social response ==
On March 16, 2008, the Colombian artist Juanes organised a free concert on the border between Colombia and Venezuela as a response to the crisis. The event was called Peace without borders and had a message of peace and brotherhood between the three nations. The concert gathered thousands of people from both sides of the border. The concert featured the singers Miguel Bosé, Alejandro Sanz, Juan Luis Guerra, Juan Fernando Velasco, Ricardo Montaner, Carlos Vives, Shakira and Juanes himself. Over the next several months, a Track II dialogue initiative facilitated by the Carter Center (including personal involvement from President Carter) and the Organization of American States brought together civil society leaders to help mend relations, and lay the groundwork for rebuilding official diplomatic ties. Social organizations and international development assistance increased their investment in peacebuilding initiatives in the border region to complement the top-down dialogue with grassroots conflict resolution capacity building.

== See also ==
- Humanitarian exchange
- Colombia-Venezuela relations
- Colombia-Ecuador relations
- Ecuador-Venezuela relations
- Operation Emmanuel
- 2010 Colombia–Venezuela diplomatic crisis
- Pan Americanism
