= Roots of Hope =

Roots of Hope, or Raíces de Esperanza, is a non-profit and non-partisan service organization, founded in 2003 with the goal of empowering Cuban youth to be the authors of their own future.

Cuba is the only remaining Latin American country that does not allow any form of anti-government opposition and dissent is punishable by loss of a job, beatings and/or imprisonment. It offers extremely limited resources and technology for its people. It is the last country in the western hemisphere to obtain fiber optic cables for internet and use of internet at home is illegal. Cell phone usage became legal in 2008, but they are still cost prohibitive in a country where the average salary is $20 a month. Business has recently been permitted, but not without high taxes and lack of business education.

Roots of Hope maintains its goal to empowering Cuban youth through programs and events that connect them with each other and with youth around the world. It is a network of more than 4,000 high school students, college students and young professionals across the U.S. and abroad, with chapters in major cities such as New York, Miami, Washington, D.C., and Madrid.

== History ==
Roots of Hope was founded in 2003 by a group of college students including Tony Jimenez, L. Felice Gorordo, Diane Cabrera, Joanna Gonzales Burgos and others. They began with an interest in Cuba, an interest in getting to know their roots, their counterparts on the island, and their history. It started with a conference between Georgetown and Harvard's Cuban-American student groups entitled Roots of Hope. Since then, it has grown into a movement of young people from all over the world, working to help their counterparts on the island by providing resources, information, and solidarity.

2013

- "#Empowerment: Camino al Futuro", a conference, is hosted at NYU.
- Yoani Sanchez's first ever TweetUp is organized by Roots of Hope in partnership with the John S. and James L. Knight Foundation, the Cuba Study Group and Univision at the Arsht Center for the Performing Arts
- Roots of Hope pilots the first Run4Roots race that has participants from the U.S. and Cuba

2012

- "Avenida Cuba" university campus tour at Georgia Tech, University of Florida, University of South Florida, Miami Dade College, University of Virginia, University of Pennsylvania, and Harvard University
- USBs for Cuba is launched: USBs have given indirect access to Internet to a small number of Cubans. The program USBs for Cuba aims to increase that number.

2011

- Run for Roots: Roots of Hope launches Run for Roots to raise awareness of the plight of youth in Cuba and as a symbol of solidarity.
- "Transformación" National Youth Leadership Conference takes place at Boston College
- US-Cuba Fellowship: Roots of Hope launches the US-Cuba Fellowship Fund to sponsor and support academic, cultural, and humanitarian initiatives with young people in Cuba who are empowering and bridge divides

2010

- Roots of Hope organizes peaceful marches across the US in solidarity with Las Damas de Blanco and the Ladies In White
  - Miami: Hosted by Gloria Estefan
  - LA: Hosted by Andy Garcia, Rosario Dawson, George Lopez and Perez Hilton
- eRevolution: Camino a Una Nueva Era' National Youth Leadership Conference takes place at Cornell University.

2009

- Peace Without Borders (Paz Sin Fronteras): Roots of Hope coordinates Latin pop star Juanes' peace concert in Havana, Cuba attracting some 1.1 million Cubans to the Plaza de la Revolución.
- Cell Phones for Cuba: Roots of Hope launches the Cell Phones for Cuba campaign to empower Cuban youth and connectivity with Cuba after cell phones became legal.
- "GenerAcción – A Generation in Action" National Youth Leadership Conference at the University of Miami.
- Ex(Change) Guide: Roots of Hope publishes an Ex(Change) Guide outlining different ways young people outside of Cuba can connect with young people on the island both through virtual and direct means – in a socially responsible and legal way.

2008

- "Inter(Cambio)" National Youth Leadership Conference takes place at Duke University.

2007

- "Evolution" National Youth Leadership Conference takes place at University of Pennsylvania.

2006

- "Juventud Despierta" National Youth Leadership Conference takes place at Princeton University.

2005

- "Cuba en el Siglo XXI" National Youth Leadership Conference takes place at Georgetown University.

2003

- "Raíces de Esperanza" National Youth Leadership Conference takes place at Harvard University.

== Leadership ==
The network and its programs are managed mostly by an international team of volunteers and an Executive Director. Interns from high school and Fellows from college work on specific projects and gain valuable experience in their areas of interest during the summer.
