= Paz Sin Fronteras =

Paz sin Fronteras (Peace without Borders) refers to a series of free outdoor concerts led by the Colombian singer Juanes along with other internationally recognized artists. The first string of concerts took place in 2008 along the Colombia–Venezuela border on the Simón Bolívar International Bridge. The second took place in 2009 in Cuba's Plaza de la Revolución (Revolution Square), and a third was planned for Caracas, Venezuela in 2013. The purpose of the first concert was to reaffirm the nonviolence message that Colombians, Venezuelans, and Ecuadorians are South American brothers, independent of the relation between the political orientation of shifting governments. It was organized by Juanes, who in turn was the show's host. It took place on March 16, 2008, between 1:35 pm and 5:40 pm (GMT) on the Simón Bolívar International Bridge, on the Colombia–Venezuela border located between the city of Cúcuta in Colombia (specifically the Metropolitan municipality of Villa de Rosario) and the town of San Antonio del Táchira in Venezuela.

Paz sin Fronteras began as an initiative against the 2008 Andean diplomatic crisis between Ecuador, Colombia, and Venezuela, after Colombian forces invaded Ecuadorian territory in the Santa Rosa Bombardment of 2008. This bombardment took place as a result of the death of Raúl Reyes, second in command of the Colombian Revolutionary Armed Forces (FARC). These border violations of the neighboring country generated a crisis that included the movement of Venezuelan and Ecuadorian troops to the borders. This crisis ended with the Rio Group meeting on Friday, March 7, 2008, in the Dominican Republic.

The artists that participated in the first concert were Alejandro Sanz, Juan Fernando Velasco, Carlos Vives, Juan Luis Guerra, Miguel Bosé, and Ricardo Montaner, in addition to Juanes. None of the artists or the individuals in charge of the concert received any payment for their services, as the event was a free outdoor concert with the purpose of serving as a symbol of peace in the region. According to calculations, more than 300,000 people attended the concert.

The second concert took place in Havana on the stage of La Plaza de la Revolución in front of more than 1.2 million people. The audience was made up of mostly Cubans, with foreigners including tourists and students. Juanes and his guests closed the concert of Paz Sin Fronteras Project in Havana.

The artists who attended included Juanes, Olga Tañón, Danny Rivera, Miguel Bosé, Víctor Manuelle, Luis Eduardo Aute, Juan Fernando Velasco, Jovanotti, Amaury Pérez, Silvio Rodríguez, Orishas, Carlos Varela, X-Alfonso, Cucu Diamantes, Yerba Buena and Los Van Van, singing together in a finale chorus for peace, in the second concert of Paz sin Fronteras.

== Paz Sin Fronteras ==
Paz Sin Fronteras (Peace Without Borders)
- Genre: Pop, rock music
- Dates: March 16, 2008
- Location: Simón Bolívar Bridge (Colombia-Venezuela border)
- Years active: 2008
- Founders: Fernán Martínez, Juanes

=== Performances ===
- Miguel Bosé
- Juan Luis Guerra
- Juanes – "Me Enamora", "A Dios le Pido", "La Camisa Negra"
- Ricardo Montaner
- Alejandro Sanz – "Corazón Partio"
- Juan Fernando Velasco
- Carlos Vives

=== Broadcasting ===
The concert was broadcast live on Caracol and RCN in Colombia and on Venevisión, RCTV Internacional and Globovisión in Venezuela. It was also broadcast on A&E in Latin America and on Univisión in the United States.

=== Cancelled attendances ===
Colombian president Álvaro Uribe cancelled his attendance at the concert by request of Fernán Martínez, Juanes' manager, who communicated to his office that the concert was intended to have a neutral agenda instead of a political one.

Colombian singer-songwriter Shakira was invited to perform at the concert, but she could not attend because of a busy schedule. However, she stated a press release saying that she would wear white on March 16 as a form to demonstrate her sympathy for Paz Sin Fronteras.

== Paz Sin Fronteras II ==
Paz Sin Fronteras II (Peace Without Borders)
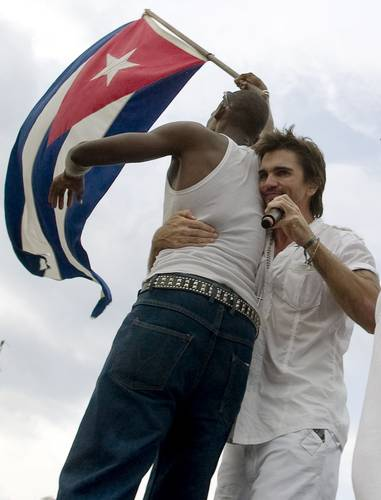
- Genre: Pop, Latin music
- Dates: September 20, 2009
- Locations: Plaza de la Revolución, Havana, Cuba
- Years active: 2009
- Founders: Fernán Martínez, Juanes

=== Message ===
The message of the concert, according to U.S. Representative Jim McGovern, was to circumvent politicians, and using the medium of music, speak directly to young people and encourage them to think in fresh ways – to change their way of thinking – and leave behind the old politics, the old hatreds, prejudices and national enmities that have locked too many people into patterns of conflict, violence, poverty and despair, dividing them from one another. It was an attempt to break down barriers and ask people to join in common purpose.

=== Performers ===
- Headliner: Juanes (Colombia)
- Amaury Pérez (Cuba)
- Danny Rivera (Puerto Rico)
- Juan Fernando Velasco (Ecuador)
- Jovanotti (Italy)
- Luis Eduardo Aute (Spain)
- Miguel Bosé (Spain)
- Olga Tañón (Puerto Rico)
- Orishas (Cuba)
- Silvio Rodríguez (Cuba)
- Los Van Van (Cuba)
- Carlos Varela (Cuba)
- Víctor Manuel (Spain)
- CuCu Diamantes y Yerba Buena (Venezuela / Cuba)
- X Alfonso (Cuba)

=== Broadcasting ===
The concert was transmitted live on the Hispanic Information and Telecommunications Network (HITN) and was also acknowledged by Representative Jim McGovern in the U.S. House of Representatives during morning-hour debate on September 22, 2009, which was broadcast on C-SPAN.

=== Reactions ===
"We are here for the music and it is a message of peace and unity, not only for Cuba, but for the entire region."

— Juanes,

Many of the 1.5 million patrons wore white to symbolize peace. The BBC's Michael Voss, who was at the five-and-a-half-hour concert, said there was a mood of excitement as many residents of the isolated, music-loving island had never seen anything like it before.

"My understanding is that he's a terrific musician. He puts on a very good concert. I certainly don't think it hurts U.S.-Cuban relations, these kinds of cultural exchanges."

— U.S. President Barack Obama, September 20, 2009

Both the United States and Cuban governments helped facilitate the concert, including providing Juanes and his company of 15 international and Cuban artists full control over message and staging. The Departments of State, Treasury and Commerce, and especially Secretary of State Hillary Clinton, provided various licenses and authorities required for U.S. musicians, technicians, musical and production equipment to travel to Cuba.

A group of Cuban American exiles in Miami, Florida protested the concert, charging that it would service the PR campaign of the Communist government of Fidel Castro. The location of the Havana concert was also seen as possibly symbolic by Cuban exiles, as Revolution Square features the headquarters of the Cuban Communist Party along with a giant metal sculpture of Che Guevara's face. Various demonstrations were staged in South Florida, where some destroyed CDs from Juanes publicly by running them over with a steamroller. Juanes also received death threats from Miami-based critics of the Cuban regime.

Before and after the performance, Juanes stated that his Paz Sin Fronteras concert is not about politics but reconciliation. According to William Booth from the Washington Post, whose following commentary is now part of the U.S. Congressional Record, "Tanon shouted that she brought greetings from Miami – home of many Cuban exiles who live in opposition to the Cuban government – and no one in the crowd booed, but instead whistled and cheered".

The concert was used by Hugo Chávez during his speech at the United Nations General Assembly of September 24, 2009 to criticize the Cuban exiles in Miami for destroying Juanes' CDs in protest.

== See also ==
- List of highest-attended concerts
