= Ana Fabricia Córdoba =

Colombian human rights activist (1959–2011)

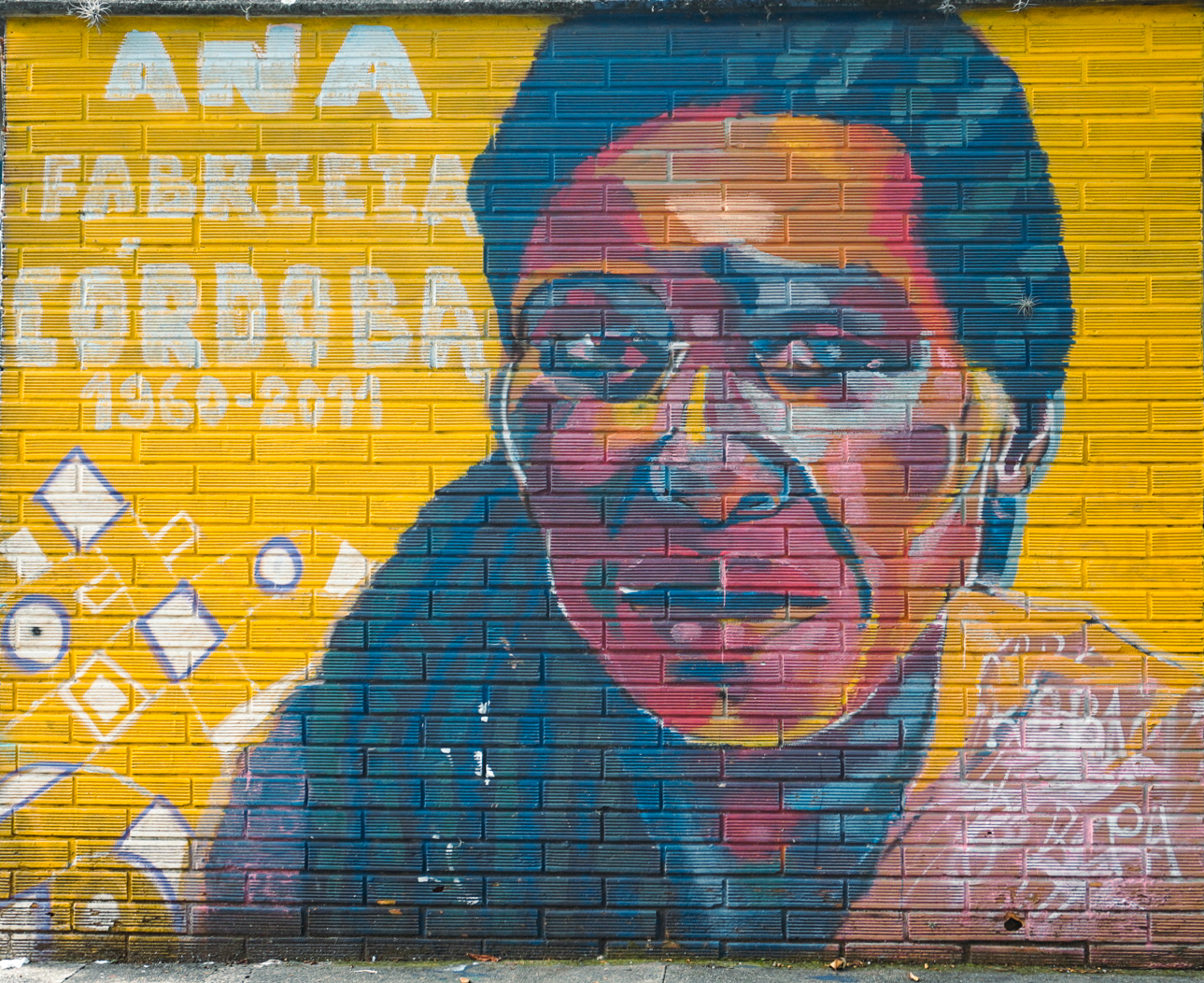
- Mural depicting Córdoba in Medellín, Colombia
- Born: c. 1959; Antioquia
- Died: June 7, 2011
- Cause of death: Assassination
- Known for: human rights activist

Ana Fabricia Córdoba Cabrera (c.1959 – June 7, 2011), also known as "La Negra", was an Afro-Colombian human rights activist, who was assassinated in 2011.

== Biography ==
Ana Fabricia was born around 1959 in Antioquia. Her parents and grandparents moved to Urabá Antioquia from Tibú due to political violence. Her extended family included cousin Piedad Córdoba, who became a politician.

In the 1980s, Córdoba's brother became a councilor for the Patriotic Union (Colombia) in Apartadó, making the family a target for political persecution. Córdoba married Delmiro Ospina.

Ospina was killed by the United Self-Defense Forces of Colombia's Bloque Bananero. Her 13-year-old son and mother were also killed by paramilitary groups. Córdoba and her five children fled Urabá to Comuna 13, Medellín. Córdoba told her story, becoming a voice for Colombian victims of violence. Due to political violence, she moved again to the Cruz neighborhood of Medellín.

In Cruz, Córdoba developed her leadership skills. She was an important figure in the Ruta Pacífica de las Mujeres (Peaceful Way of Women) and founded LATEPAZ (Asociación Líderes Hacia delante por un Tejido Humano de Paz, or Leaders for a Human Network of Peace).

In 2006, Córdoba was arrested for being a guerrilla, but released due to a lack of evidence.

On July 7, 2010, Córdoba's nineteen-year-old son was killed. Córdoba believed that he was killed by the police, looking for evidence and making the accusation on national television. Over the next several months, Córdoba's family continued to be targeted by the authorities. Córdoba continued to condemn this persecution, and highlighted the victims of violence in Colombia.

In April 2011, Córdoba announced that "they" were going to kill her, and that no one was doing anything about it. On June 7, 2011, an unknown hitman shot and killed Córdoba on a bus. After Córdoba's death, the head of the Corporación para el Desarrollo Social (Corporation for Social Development) stressed the importance of protecting the members of her family. In early 2014, her son was killed as a part of the ongoing military conflict in Colombia. His death was reported to not have been done in restitution, leading to outcry. He was the fifth member of the family to die violently, leaving only two of Córdoba's children alive.
