= Piedad Córdoba =

Colombian lawyer and politician (1955–2024)

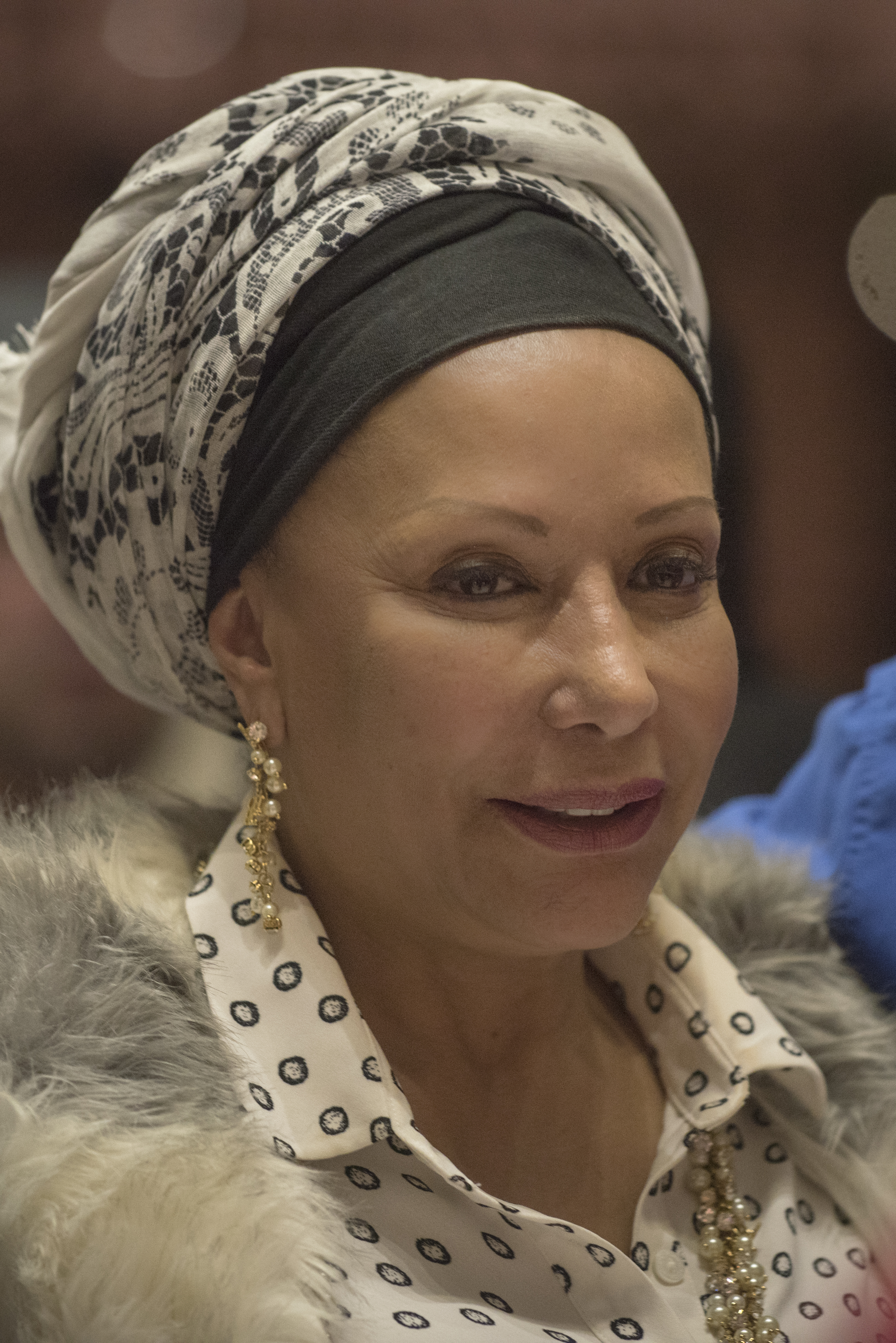
- Córdoba in 2017

Senator of Colombia
- In office 20 July 2022 – 20 January 2024
- In office 20 July 2006 – 27 September 2010
- In office 20 July 1994 – 8 July 2005

Member of the Chamber of Representatives of Colombia
- In office 20 July 1992 – 20 July 1994
- Constituency: Antioquia Department

Personal details
- Born: Piedad Esneda Córdoba Ruiz; 25 January 1955 Medellín, Antioquia, Colombia
- Died: 20 January 2024 (aged 68) Medellín, Antioquia, Colombia
- Party: Liberal
- Spouse: Luis Ángel Castro Hinestroza (1973–1999)
- Children: 4
- Education: Pontifical Bolivarian University
- Profession: Lawyer
- Website: piedadcordoba.com

Piedad Esneda Córdoba Ruiz (25 January 1955 – 20 January 2024) was a Colombian lawyer and politician who served as a senator from 1994 to 2010. A Liberal Party politician, she also served as a member of the Chamber of Representatives of Colombia for Antioquia from 1992 to 1994.

An outspoken critic of the administration of President Álvaro Uribe Vélez (2002–2010), she was twice investigated by the Inspector General, which resulted in her being stripped of her seat in Congress in 2005 and again in 2010 and being banned from holding public office for 18 years. In 2016, the Supreme Court overruled both decisions based on a lack of evidence.

During 2007, Córdoba participated as an official government mediator for the humanitarian exchange discussions between the Government of Colombia and the FARC guerrilla group, along with President Hugo Chávez. After the end of the mediation in November, the FARC announced the release of hostages Clara Rojas and Consuelo González. She was nominated for the 2009 Nobel Peace Prize for her work in promoting peace and human rights in conflict zones but her nomination caused controversy and uproar in her native Colombia.

Córdoba was judicially denounced for treason under Colombian law after making controversial declarations against the government and president during a political event in Mexico in March 2007, a charge investigated by the Supreme Court. As part of the "farcpolitics" scandal, Colombian authorities have probed her due to accusations linking the Senator with the FARC.

In 2010, Córdoba spoke before the European Parliament, asking it to pressure the government of President Juan Manuel Santos into entering into peace talks with the nation's insurgent groups. However, Córdoba later apologized to Santos for her remarks and stated that she didn't want to put the president against a wall, but serve as an "ally for peace".

In 2012, Córdoba was named by Foreign Policy magazine as the most influential Ibero-American intellectual, again causing much controversy in her native Colombia.

In 2017, Córdoba officially announced her intention to run for president in 2018.

In May 2022, Córdoba was detained at Palmerola Airport in Comayagua, Honduras, for not declaring more than 62,000 dollars in cash. She was then released.

Córdoba died from a heart attack on 20 January 2024, at the age of 68.

== Early life ==
Córdoba was born in Medellín, Antioquia, to Zabulón Córdoba (brother of political leader of the department of Chocó Diego Luis Córdoba) and Lía Ruiz. Her cousin, Ana Fabricia Córdoba, was a noted human rights activist. She studied law at the Universidad Pontificia Bolivariana in Medellín. She specialized in Labour Law at the same university, and in Public Opinion and Political Marketing at the Pontificia Universidad Javeriana in Bogotá.

== Early political career ==
Córdoba began her political career in Medellín working as a community leader in many neighborhoods along with political leader William Jaramillo Gómez. Between 1984 and 1986 Córdoba held her first public office job, working as a municipal sub-controller. In 1986, Córdoba was appointed private secretary to the mayor of Medellín.

In 1988 Córdoba was elected Councilwoman of Medellín, where she remained until 1990, when she postulated her name as candidate for the Chamber of Representatives of Colombia but did not secure enough votes to be elected. A few months after the congressional elections, Córdoba ran for deputy to the Antioquia Assembly, this time successfully getting elected.

=== Congressional career ===
After the Constituent Assembly adopted the new Constitution of 1991, Córdoba ran for congress once again for the Chamber of Representatives for the period 1992–1994. In 1994 her political mentor William Jaramillo announced that he was not going to seek reelection and Córdoba assumed his role. She was elected to the Senate for the 1994–1998 period receiving most of her votes from the departments of Antioquia and Chocó.

Due to her public profile Córdoba became one of the most notorious figures of the Latin American feminist movement in Colombia. She became part of a popular inter-parliamentary group that promotes government policies on sexuality. In 1995, Córdoba participated in the Fourth World Conference on Women in Beijing, China.

Through Congress, Córdoba became nationally known for taking controversial positions, such as the reactivation of the extradition law in 1997 and other positions that were seen as radical and belligerent. In 1998 Córdoba was nonetheless reelected as senator. She promoted debates focused on minorities and communitarian groups of mothers, as well as the resolution of the Colombian armed conflict through peaceful negotiations.

During the investigation into President Ernesto Samper for allegedly accepting money in his presidential campaign from the Cali drug trafficking cartel, Córdoba became an outspoken defender of the president during the scandal that was later dubbed Proceso 8000.

=== Kidnapping ===
In 1999 Carlos Castaño, leader of the United Self-Defense Forces of Colombia (AUC) paramilitary group, kidnapped Senator Córdoba. After several weeks she was freed and exiled with her family in Canada. After 14 months in exile and reports by Colombian authorities that security had improved, Córdoba returned to Colombia to resume her political duties, leaving her family behind. She has been the victim of two assassination attempts.

Death threats and political ban through coercion

In the elections of 2002, the regions where Córdoba had traditionally received strong voting results like Medellín and Chocó were seen as being under the control of the AUC paramilitary group. Córdoba was elected once again for Congress this time obtaining strong voting results in the capital, Bogotá.

Corruption debates and loss of seat in Congress

In 2003, Córdoba was involved in a series of debates regarding corruption by the Minister of the Interior and Justice, Fernando Londoño Hoyos. After the debates in May of that year, with her image and profile improved, she was elected President of the National Liberal Directorate (head of the Colombia liberal party).

In 2005, the Council of State modified the electoral results of 2002 after proving there had been electoral fraud in the departments of Valle del Cauca and Atlántico. The new results left Córdoba out of Congress. She then promoted the leftist radical wing of the Colombian Liberal party in order to prevent it from moving towards the political current of President Álvaro Uribe.

Citizens Power 21st Century political movement

For this reason, she founded the Poder Ciudadano Siglo XXI political movement as an internal dissidence of the Liberal party. In the legislative elections of 2006 Córdoba's political movement did not get a high voting turnout; however, she was elected once again to the Senate.

In 2006 Córdoba became part of the Seventh Commission of Congress, which is in charge of debating labor topics. She had previously worked on the Third Commission which deals with financial affairs, the Fifth Commission which deals with mining and energy and the Second Commission which debated topics related to foreign affairs. Córdoba was also president of the Senate's Human Rights Commission and the Peace Commission. As a congresswoman she has supported projects that focused mainly on "community mothers", women head of households, Afro-Colombian communities, LGBT groups, groups against family violence and corruption.

=== Controversy in Mexico ===
On 11 March 2007, Córdoba attended a symposium in Mexico City called Los Partidos Políticos y Una Nueva Ciudad (Political parties and a new city) which was supported by guerrilla groups from Colombia, the Revolutionary Armed Forces of Colombia (FARC) and the National Liberation Army (ELN), both considered narco-terrorist organizations by the US government and the European Union and the Republic of Colombia. Córdoba generated controversy after declaring that "the progressive governments of Latin America should break their diplomatic relations with Colombia" and also that Álvaro Uribe was a "paramilitary".

The head of the Liberal Party, César Gaviria, rejected Córdoba's opinions. Córdoba was later judicially denounced for treason after making these declarations, a charge which is currently being investigated by Colombia's Supreme Court. The outrage was surprising, since the warm relations between Uribe's administration and the right-wing paramilitaries—also recognized as "narco-terrorists" by the US and the EU—was a matter of public record: the paramilitaries had endorsed Uribe in the 2002 presidential election, describing him as the 'man closest to our philosophy', and were rewarded with the "Justice and Peace Law", which gave them an amnesty in return for light sentences, as long as they confess to their crimes. Many were extradited to the U.S. under drug trafficking charges. It was described by a former US ambassador to Bogotá as "a law that couldn't be better designed to give the criminals a way out". Uribe's second term in office was marked by the "para-politics" scandal, which largely vindicated Córdoba's criticisms of his administration.

=== Humanitarian exchange negotiator ===
On 16 August 2007, in a surprising move, President Álvaro Uribe appointed Córdoba as mediator in the humanitarian exchange in an effort to negotiate the freedom of some 50 (number at the time) hostages held by FARC and the possible release of some 500 guerrillas imprisoned by the government. Córdoba then asked the President of Venezuela Hugo Chávez to mediate also, with the support of President Uribe.

Córdoba met with alias Raul Reyes, spokesman and leader of the FARC, to coordinate a meeting with President Chávez in Venezuela. In Venezuela, Chávez and Córdoba met with Rodrigo Granda and Iván Márquez among other members of the guerrilla as part of the negotiations. Photos of Córdoba and the guerrillas surfaced in an online website called Agencia Bolivariana de Prensa (ABP) which showed Córdoba in an amicable and cordial relationship with the FARC, receiving flowers, kisses, and hugs. This generated controversy among the government, the Colombian public and other critics, to which she responded that the photos "were taken out of context".

On 22 November, President Uribe ended the mediation after Chávez broke with diplomatic protocol by placing a series of calls directly to the high command of the Colombian military. Uribe had conditioned Chávez against any attempt to talk to the Colombian military high command without going through appropriate diplomatic channels. Chávez initially accepted the decision but afterward reacted by pulling his ambassador from Bogotá, and he decided to cease diplomatic relations between the two countries and even announced his intent to sharply reduce bilateral commerce.

On 20 December 2007, Córdoba accused an unspecified "top Colombian government official" of orchestrating an assassination attempt towards her on Venezuelan soil. This accusation sparked a confrontation with Juan Manuel Santos, the Minister of Defense, who had previously been the subject of other allegations made by Córdoba. So far no proof or testimony about the alleged conspiracy is known.

Following the end of her official role as a mediator, Córdoba accused President Uribe, the Minister of Defense and the Colombian Armed Forces of engaging in military operations or otherwise obstructing announced hostage releases, in spite of subsequent releases being carried out regardless.

=== Alleged "farcpolitics" ===
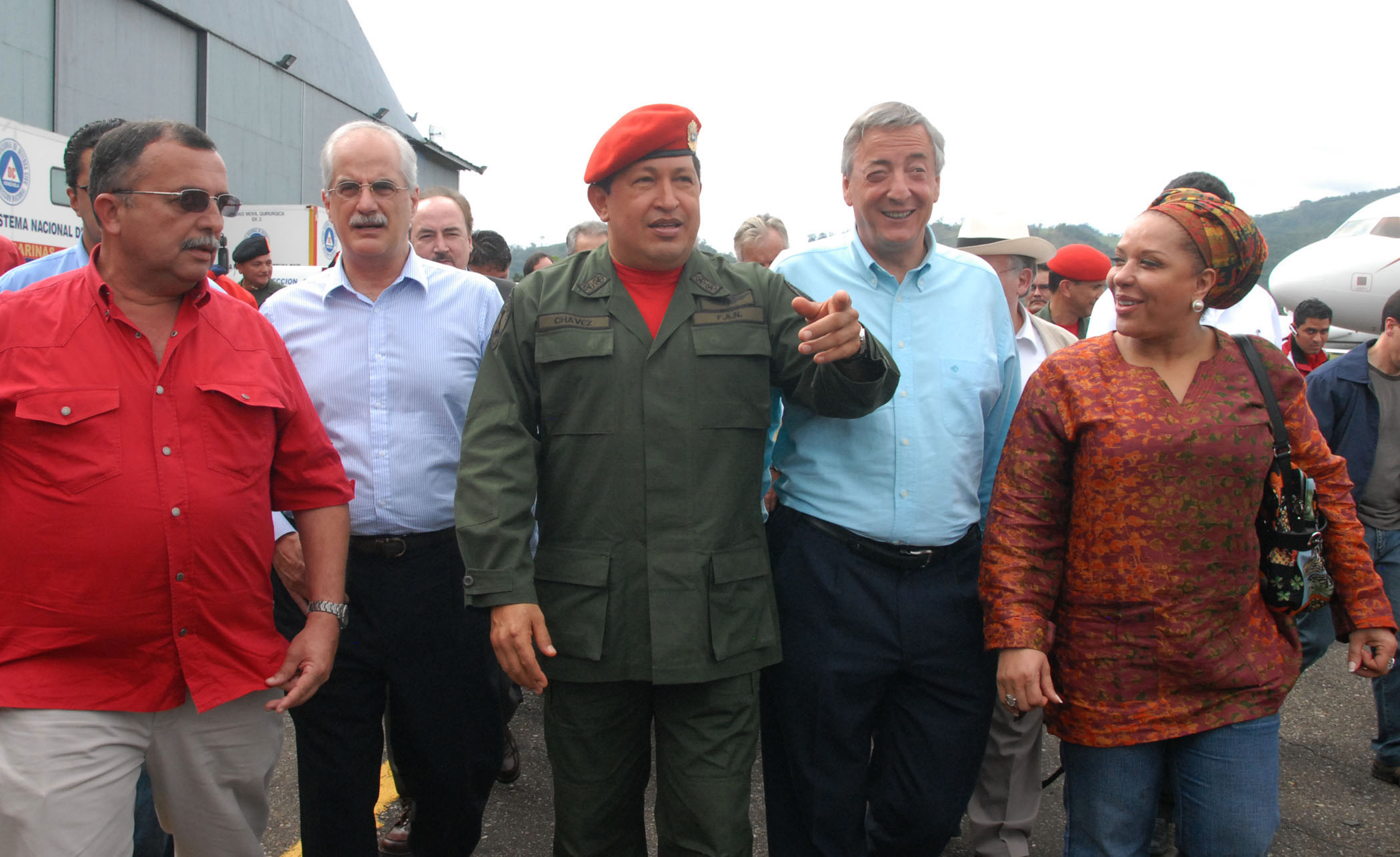
International guarantors of the Operation Emmanuel, from right to left: Senator Piedad Córdoba, former Argentine President Néstor Kirchner, Venezuelan President Hugo Chávez, Argentine Chancellor Jorge Taiana, and Venezuelan Vice President Ramón Carrizales

On 24 April 2008, the Colombian government released the "FARC files", said to be found on the computers found in the Ecuadorian camp of the former FARC commander Raúl Reyes, who had been killed in March by a Colombian army airstrike. According to the information in the files, Córdoba would reportedly be implicated due to having friendly ties with the guerrillas. Under the codename of "Teodora de Bolivar", allegedly in reference to the Senator, she would be one of twelve people mentioned as part of a potential transitional government set up by the FARC in the event that they seized power in Colombia. The files are said to indicate that Córdoba would have received money from Venezuelan President Hugo Chávez to fund social projects in the department. The Colombian Supreme Court asked for the seized files in order to establish if there are valid reasons for a criminal investigation, but the Colombian government wanted the files to be validated by Interpol first. Interpol reported that the Colombian government had not manipulated the seized computer exhibits and validated their authenticity, but did not certify the accuracy of their contents.

Córdoba claimed the revelations are a "smokescreen" meant to divert attention from the Colombian parapolitics scandal affecting the Uribe administration but Interpol has neither confirmed nor denied the contents.

=== 2009 Nobel Peace Prize nomination ===
The senator was nominated for the Nobel Peace Prize, by solicitation of former Nobel Peace Prize winner Adolfo Pérez Esquivel, causing much controversy and outrage amongst Colombians.

=== 2010 ban from public office ===
On 27 September 2010, Senator Córdoba's credentials were revoked by the Inspector General of Colombia, Alejandro Ordoñez, due to her alleged FARC ties. The Inspector General's investigation concluded that Córdoba was involved in promoting and supporting the guerrilla group. The same decision also forbid Córdoba from holding any public office for eighteen years. Ordoñez, a conservative jurist, has a track record of using legal pretexts to ban progressive politicians from running for public office, and used similar methods against the mayor of Bogotá, Gustavo Petro. Ordoñez did not take any action against supporters of the former president Álvaro Uribe, whose administration was accused of systematically collaborating with right-wing paramilitaries.

Córdoba rejected the Inspector General's decision and accused him of "criminalizing humanitarian work." She announced that she would counter the decision and intended to prove her innocence. Córdoba also reiterated her wish to continue working towards peace and freedom.

According to the Inspector General, the investigation originated from the electronic media seized during Operation Phoenix, the military operation where FARC spokesperson Raúl Reyes was killed in Ecuador. The Inspector General's decision refers to electronic documents identifying Córdoba with the aliases of "Teodora", "Teodora Bolivar" and "La Negra". The parliament, according to the Inspector General's decision, also exceeded the duties specified in the authorization given to her by the Colombian government as an official mediator for the humanitarian exchange. Based on these and other findings, the Inspector General reported he had established that the senator gave advice to FARC, such as sending voice recordings instead of video footage of the insurgent group's hostages as "proofs of life" in order to improve their strategy.

=== 2016 restitution ===
In 2016, the Supreme Court of Colombia overturned the Inspector General's decisions, ruling that there was insufficient evidence to support his findings and restoring Córdoba's full political rights.

=== 2018 Colombian presidential election ===
On 12 June 2017, Córdoba announced herself as a candidate for the 2018 presidential election. Though she had not identified which party she would represent in the election, she confidently declared to the press, "I will be the president of Colombia in 2018." She did not get elected.

After declaring her candidacy for president, Córdoba faced death threats from the paramilitary group Águilas Negras (Black Eagles). The threats were distributed through pamphlets in the country's capital of Bogotá.

In March 2022 she was amongst 151 international feminists signing Feminist Resistance Against War: A Manifesto, in solidarity with the Russian Feminist Anti-War Resistance. (Note: This manifesto was criticized by both Ukrainian feminists and members of the Feminist Anti-War Resistance themselves.)
