= Operacion Fenix =

Attack by the Colombian military against the FARC

Operación Fénix
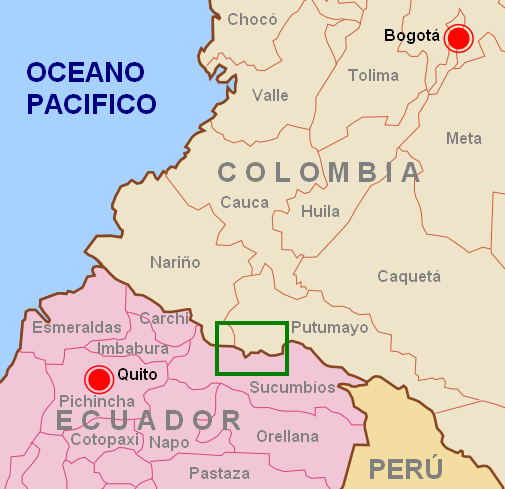
- Location: Near Santa Rosa de Yanamaru, Sucumbíos, Ecuador; 00°22′37″N 77°07′48″W
- Target: Revolutionary Armed Forces of Colombia
- Date: March 1, 2008; 00:25 (UTC–5)
- Executed by: Colombian Armed Forces
- Casualties: 24 killed

Operación Fénix (English: Operation Phoenix), was an attack by the Colombian military against a camp of the guerrilla group the Revolutionary Armed Forces of Colombia (FARC) 1.8 kilometers (1.1 mi) over the border in Sucumbíos Province, Ecuador on March 1, 2008. The raid succeeded in killing Raúl Reyes, second-in-command of FARC, as well as some two dozen individuals present in the encampment, including an Ecuadorian citizen and four Mexicans, allegedly research students invited to the camp after attending a Bolivarian congress in Quito. In the aftermath of the attack, a diplomatic crisis emerged between Ecuador, Colombia, and Venezuela.

== Raid ==
The incursion took place in the vicinity of Santa Rosa de Yanamaru in Ecuador's Sucumbíos province

In the week before the incursion, it was revealed that the Colombian government, with assistance from the United States' FBI and DEA, had wiretapped several satellite phones that were used by FARC forces in Southern Colombia. According to an unnamed Colombian military source, an international call made by Venezuelan President Hugo Chávez to Raúl Reyes on one of these phones was intercepted by authorities on February 27. The source claimed that Chávez called Reyes to inform him that the release of three FARC hostages held captive for almost 7 years had been completed, and the intercepted call was then used to track Reyes to a location in Colombia, near the Ecuadorian border.

Colombian troop movements from Cali to the border area began on February 29. On March 1, 2008, at 00:25 local time (0525 UTC), Colombia launched a military operation, 1.8 kilometers (1.1 mi) into Ecuador.

Colombian intelligence reports indicated that Raúl Reyes was expected to stay near Angostura, Ecuador, for the night of February 29, 2008. On and after February 27, several members of FARC 48th Front were captured by Colombian security forces near the Ecuadorian border, taking away some support from the main group. During the subsequent operation, the Colombian Air Force stormed Angostura, followed by a Colombian special forces group and members of the Colombian National Police.

According to Colombian authorities, the guerrillas responded to the initial bombardment from a position in the vicinity of Santa Rosa de Yanamaru, on the Ecuadorian side of the border, killing Colombian soldier Carlos Hernández. A second bombardment was then carried out, resulting in the deaths of Raúl Reyes and at least 20 more FARC members. Two bodies, several documents and three laptops found in the guerrilla camp were returned to Colombia.

This was the first time the Colombian military had killed a member of FARC's leadership council in combat. After the operation, Colombian authorities increased security measures nationwide fearing FARC retaliation.

According to the Ecuadorian government, the attack happened 3 kilometres (1.9 mi) inside its territory, lacked its permission, and was a planned strike, intended to be followed by the incursion of Colombian troops by helicopter. It pointed out that the attack had left a total of more than 20 guerrillas and others dead in Ecuadorian territory, many of them found wearing underwear or sleeping clothes. Ecuador's government concluded that the attack was a "massacre" and not the result of combat or "hot pursuit". Ecuadorian president Rafael Correa estimated that the war planes penetrated 10 km into Ecuador's territory and struck the guerrilla camp while flying north, followed by troops in helicopters who completed the killings. He noted that some of the bodies had been found to be shot from behind.

Ecuadorian authorities found three wounded women in the camp, including a Mexican student identified as Lucía Andrea Morett Álvarez. Lucía Morett claimed she was visiting the guerrilla group as part of an academic investigation, refusing to answer other questions about her time among them. Regarding the attack on the camp, she has stated: "I was asleep when we received a first aerial attack. Two or three hours later we were attacked again". Ecuador was investigating together with Mexico whether Mexicans were killed during the raid. According to the director of the Ecuadorian military hospital which treated the three women, they had received some sort of medical attention from both the attacking Colombian forces and the Ecuadorian soldiers who found them later.
