= Gustavo Moncayo =

Colombian teacher and pacifist (1952–2022)

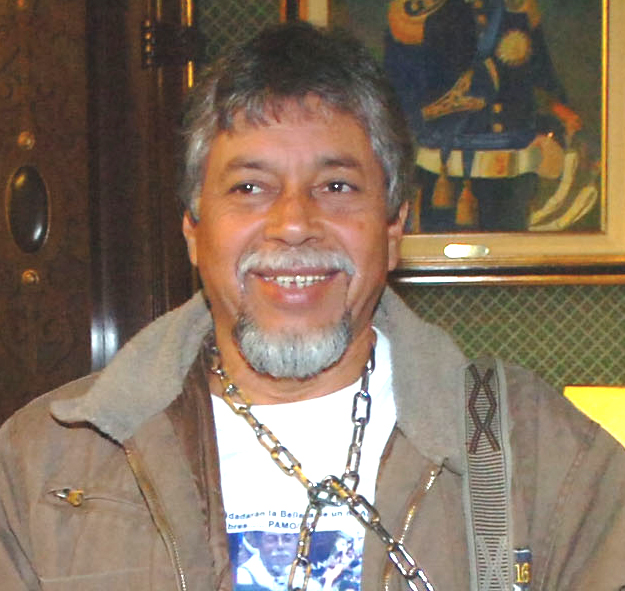
Gustavo Guillermo Moncayo Rincón in 2008

Gustavo Guillermo Moncayo Rincón (29 November 1952 – 15 November 2022), popularly known as El caminante por la paz (Spanish for the Walker for Peace), was a Colombian teacher who in 2007 walked 1,186 km from his hometown Sandoná, in the department of Nariño in the south of Colombia to the capital city Bogotá, seeking to promote an agreement for the release of his son Pablo Emilio who had been a prisoner of the guerrilla group FARC since 1997.

== Walk from Sandoná to Bogotá ==
On 17 June 2007, which is Father's Day in Colombia, Moncayo, accompanied by his daughter, began walking from Sandoná along the Pan-American Highway, stopping in every town he found on his path, to rest and to collect signatures on a petition asking President Álvaro Uribe to free his son, and other hostages held by the FARC, through a prisoner-exchange.

After few days, his body started to show signs of fatigue; his and his daughter's feet had to be treated for blisters resulting from the enormous effort.

As Moncayo approached the city of Popayán, his walk started to be covered by the media, and his name became increasingly well-known to the Colombian public.

When he arrived in the city of Cali, Moncayo was received by Governor Angelino Garzón who offered him a place to stay. Days later, when he arrived in Pereira, he was received by the mayor of that city, who decorated him a "citizen of honour". He crossed the highest pass of the Andes before arriving in the city of Ibagué.

On Wednesday, 1 August 2007, Moncayo walked the last stretch of his journey, to the historic downtown of the capital city, and arrived in Bolívar Square, cheered on by thousands of people.

== Uribe meets Moncayo ==
The arrival of Gustavo Moncayo at the Plaza de Bolívar led to a public exchange of views between him and President Uribe, who offered to declare a "meeting zone" for ninety days, in which his representatives and those of the FARC might negotiate a peace accord, but that such a step could come only after the FARC released its hostages.

Moncayo commented,

Sadly, our children, our loved ones, remain there in the jungle . . . and we are in the middle of this political game between the government and the FARC.

He also expressed the opinion that Uribe's offer to the FARC was not serious.

== Criticism and Threats ==
The direct attacks on Moncayo and his family were perpetrated by far-right groups, including paramilitaries and supporters of the government of Álvaro Uribe, even after the release of his son. re-victimizing their situation, not only because of the kidnapping of their son by the FARC, but also because they were considered military targets, and a price was put on their heads, facing constant threats and political persecution that put his life and that of his family at risk. For example, Fernando Londoño, former Minister of the Interior of the Colombian Conservative Party,(who was disqualified from holding public office for 15 years by the Attorney General's Office in 2004 due to a conflict of interest and abuse of authority in the Recchi case, a consortium that had a contract with the Colombian State).Londoño criticized Moncayo in an opinion column for a Colombian regional newspaper, accusing Moncayo's son, Pablo Emilio, and the other military officers who defended Patascoy of incompetence during the attack.and wrote that his father was spreading "Marxist venom through Colombia's veins".

== Release of Pablo Moncayo ==
On 16 April 2009, FARC announced that they intended to release Pablo to his father and liberal Senator Piedad Córdoba as a humanitarian gesture. He was released on 30 March 2010.

== See also ==
- Kidnappings in Colombia
