= Cecilia Cubas =

Paraguayan murder victim (1973–2004)

- Born: January 14, 1973; Asunción, Paraguay
- Died: December 24, 2004 (aged 31); Ñemby, Paraguay
- Cause of death: Murder by asphyxia (kidnapped)
- Body discovered: February 16, 2005
- Occupation: businesswoman
- Known for: Daughter of ex-President of Paraguay
- Parents: Mirtha Gusinky (mother); Raúl Cubas (father)

Cecilia Cubas Gusinky (January 14, 1973 – December 24, 2004) was a Paraguayan businesswoman. She was the daughter of former Paraguayan president Raúl Cubas and senator Mirtha Gusinky who was found dead on February 16 2005, underneath an abandoned house near Asunción, nearly five months after she was kidnapped. Cubas was the third kidnapping victim officially recognized in a decade in Paraguay.

== Kidnapping ==
Cubas, 32, was abducted by gunmen two blocks from her home in Asunción on September 21, 2004, sparking a massive search by security forces who hoped to rescue her alive. Residents of Asunción had plastered "Free Cecilia" signs on buildings, houses and cars.

Cubas' father, the former president, a wealthy businessman who governed for less than a year between 1998 and 1999, paid a ransom of US$800,000 for his daughter's release in November 2004 after negotiating with her captors through e-mail. The kidnappers had initially demanded $5 million. However, they later told her father that the payment was merely a fine and cut off all communication.

== Discovery of body and aftermath ==
Her naked body was found in an underground chamber connected to tunnels running under the house and due to the state of decomposition had to be identified by a dental exam. Her mouth and nose had been covered with adhesive tape and she had been buried alive.

Cubas and his wife, along with then President Nicanor Duarte Frutos, accompanied police to the site where the body was found.

Among the information that was later released regarding the kidnapping of Cubas, was the fact that the kidnappers had received training and support from the Colombian terrorist group FARC (Revolutionary Armed Forces of Colombia); the support of this group came via the "foreign minister" of the FARC, Rodrigo Granda. Osmar Martínez from the PPL (Partido Patria Libre), who was arrested as the main suspect for this crime, was the link with Granda.

The investigation into the kidnapping was conducted with the help of the Colombian attorney general's office.

== See also ==
- List of kidnappings
- List of solved missing person cases (2000s)
