= Ecuador–Venezuela relations =

- Ecuador: Venezuela

Diplomatic ties between Ecuador and Venezuela trace back to the Spanish colonization of the Americas. With the independence both countries united under the Gran Colombia along with New Granada (then Colombia and Panama). Venezuela currently have no formal diplomatic ties with Ecuador as aftermath of the 2024 raid on the Mexican embassy in Ecuador.

== History ==
After the dissolution of the Gran Colombia, Ecuador named Pedro Gual Escandón as plenipotentiary minister with the main task of resolving the debt acquired while part of the Gran Colombia union as well as to establish diplomatic relations with the New Granada and Venezuela. On August 4, 1852 Venezuela sent a diplomatic delegation in Quito and named José Julián Ponce as finance administrator.

The relations remained cordial and entered into a second period between 1910 and 1963 with two diplomatic incidents occurring in 1928 and 1955. Ecuador and Venezuela strengthened ties in politics, diplomacy and military.

=== Present relations ===
Ecuador officially joined the Bolivarian Alliance for the Americas (ALBA), a Venezuelan regional cooperation initiative, in June 2009.

After President Rafael Correa was replaced by Lenin Moreno in 2017, there was a radical turn in the relations with Venezuela. Ecuador broke diplomatic relations with Venezuela. Ecuador did not any more recognize the regime of Nicolás Maduro, former close ally of Correa. Instead, Ecuador recognized and supported Juan Guaidó as Interim President of Venezuela.

In July 2018, President Lenín Moreno of Ecuador distanced himself from ALBA, stating that the organization "has not worked for awhile". Relations between Ecuador and Venezuela began to deteriorate after the Ecuadorian government called for the arrest of former Ecuadorian president Rafael Correa. Correa, who was an ally of Venezuela's Bolivarian government and shared his 21st century socialism ideas, was defended by Venezuelan president Nicolás Maduro.
