= Sigifredo López =

Colombian politician

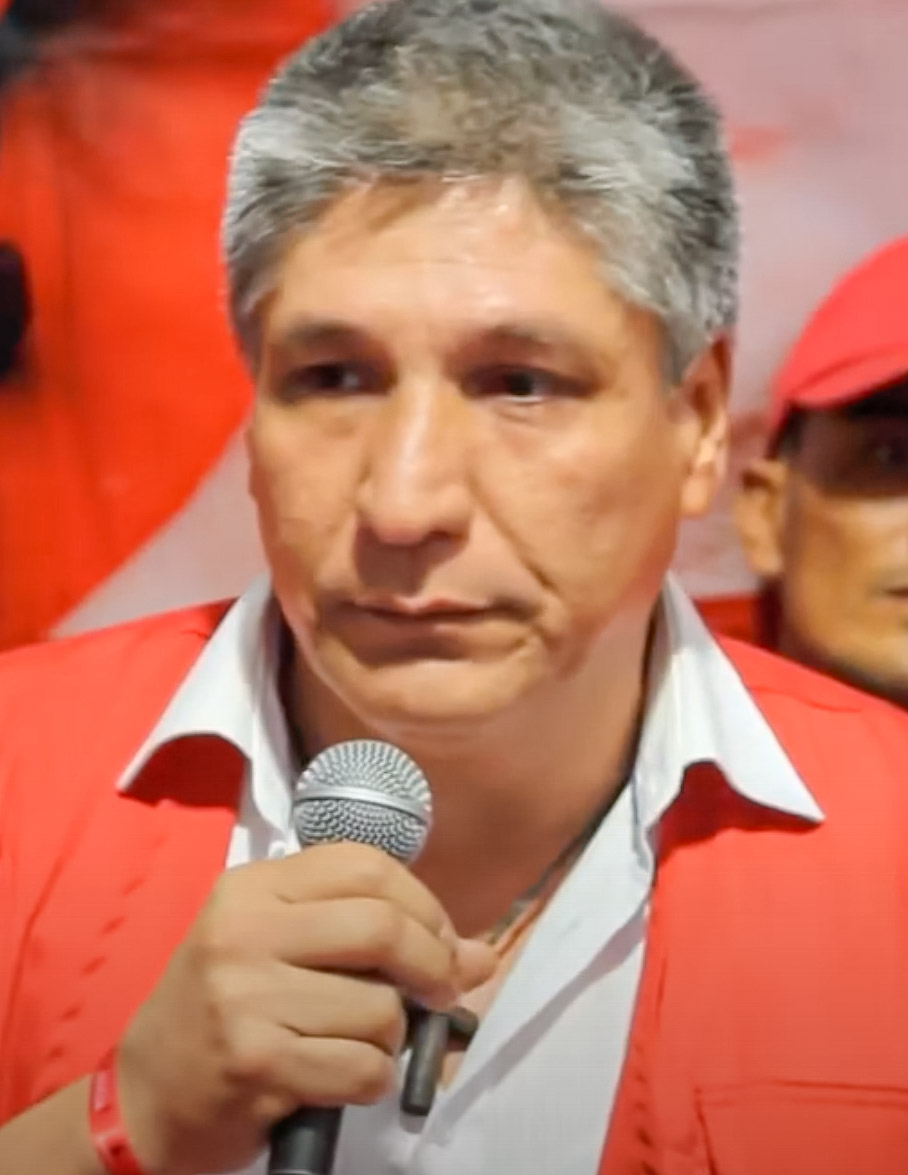
Image of Sigifredo Lopez

Sigifredo López Tobón (born 29 October 1963 in Pradera, Valle del Cauca, Colombia) is a lawyer and politician. While deputy in the administrative department of Valle del Cauca he was kidnapped by the Revolutionary Armed Forces of Colombia (FARC) in 2002. After surviving a massacre of 11 of his fellow deputies, also kidnapped, on 18 June 2007, he was released on February 5, 2009.
