= Rodrigo Granda =

Ricardo González also known as Rodrigo Granda is a Colombian Venezuelan, member of Revolutionary Armed Forces of Colombia (FARC). He has served as international spokesman of the guerrilla organization. He currently faces criminal charges in Paraguay for his alleged involvement from an intellectual and logistic angle in the kidnapping and subsequent murder of Cecilia Cubas, daughter of former President Raúl Cubas.

== Arrest in Venezuela ==
His name became well-known because of the events that began on 13 December 2004 when he was captured in Venezuela by Colombian intelligence officials with extra-official support from Venezuelan police, and clandestinely transported to the Colombia-Venezuela border in Cúcuta where Colombian authorities legalized his capture. He had been in Caracas, Venezuela participating in a conference in representation of the FARC guerrilla, organization for which Granda is an international spokesman, for this he was dubbed as "FARC's foreign minister". Due to this unauthorized Colombian operation in Venezuelan territory, his arrest created a temporal severance of bilateral relations between the governments of Hugo Chávez and Álvaro Uribe.

== Release and return to the FARC ==
Granda was later released by the Colombian government after President of France Nicolas Sarkozy persuaded President Uribe to do so, as concession for the "humanitarian exchange" which consists in the exchange of criminals held by the government (included Granda) for hostages held by the FARC. On 8 October 2007 Granda visited FARC campsites in the mountains of Colombia and announced his return to the FARC to participate in the negotiations for a possible humanitarian exchange.

== Humanitarian exchange negotiations ==
In November 2007, Granda traveled to Venezuela along with alias Iván Márquez and other group of guerrillas to meet President Hugo Chávez and Colombian senator Piedad Córdoba in the Miraflores Palace, Caracas in an attempt to negotiate an exchange of prisoners.

After the failure of the negotiations and the diplomatic tensions generated from this between the governments of Álvaro Uribe and Hugo Chávez, it was reported that Granda was among those registered to vote in Venezuela for the 2007 Venezuelan constitutional referendum. CNE member Vicente Díaz told reporters that Granda can't be removed from the electoral registry at this time, but that he is not allowed to vote due to an administrative objection from 2005. In 2014 during negotiations, Rodrigo Granda said that the FARC was not financing its operation with drugs, however, there are many suggestions that the Colombian Guerrillas and mostly the FARC do manage a drug dealing business.

== 2021 arrest ==
On October 19, 2021, Granda was detained in Mexico on an arrest warrant which was issued by Interpol. Colombian Defense Minister Diego Molano denied allegations that warrant was issued by Colombia, but rather Paraguay. Despite his later allegations that he was never arrested, his arrest was earlier revealed by two lawmakers from Comunes, the political party descended from FARC, Carlos Lozada and Pablo Catatumbo. Granda was later deported back to Colombia, where he accused “some very influential people of the Colombian government” of ordering his arrest. However, he remained wanted in Paraguay for the kidnapping and murder of Cecilia Cubas.

== See also ==
- Rodrigo Granda affair
- Cecilia Cubas
