= Santa Rosa de Sucumbíos =

Rural parish of Sucumbíos Province in Ecuador

Coordinates: 0°21′31″N 77°7′59″W

Santa Rosa de Sucumbíos is an Ecuadorian town in the Putumayo Canton of the province of Sucumbíos. It is located near the border with Colombia. It is also known as Santa Rosa de Yanamaru.

As of 1988 there were 71 Cofán people living in the town's Indian reservation. On 1 March 2008, the number two of the Revolutionary Armed Forces of Colombia (FARC), Raúl Reyes, and 16 others were killed by a bombardment of the Colombian Air Force and land incursion the Colombian military, sparking the 2008 Andean diplomatic crisis.
