= Juan Fernando Velasco =

Ecuadorian musician (born 1972)

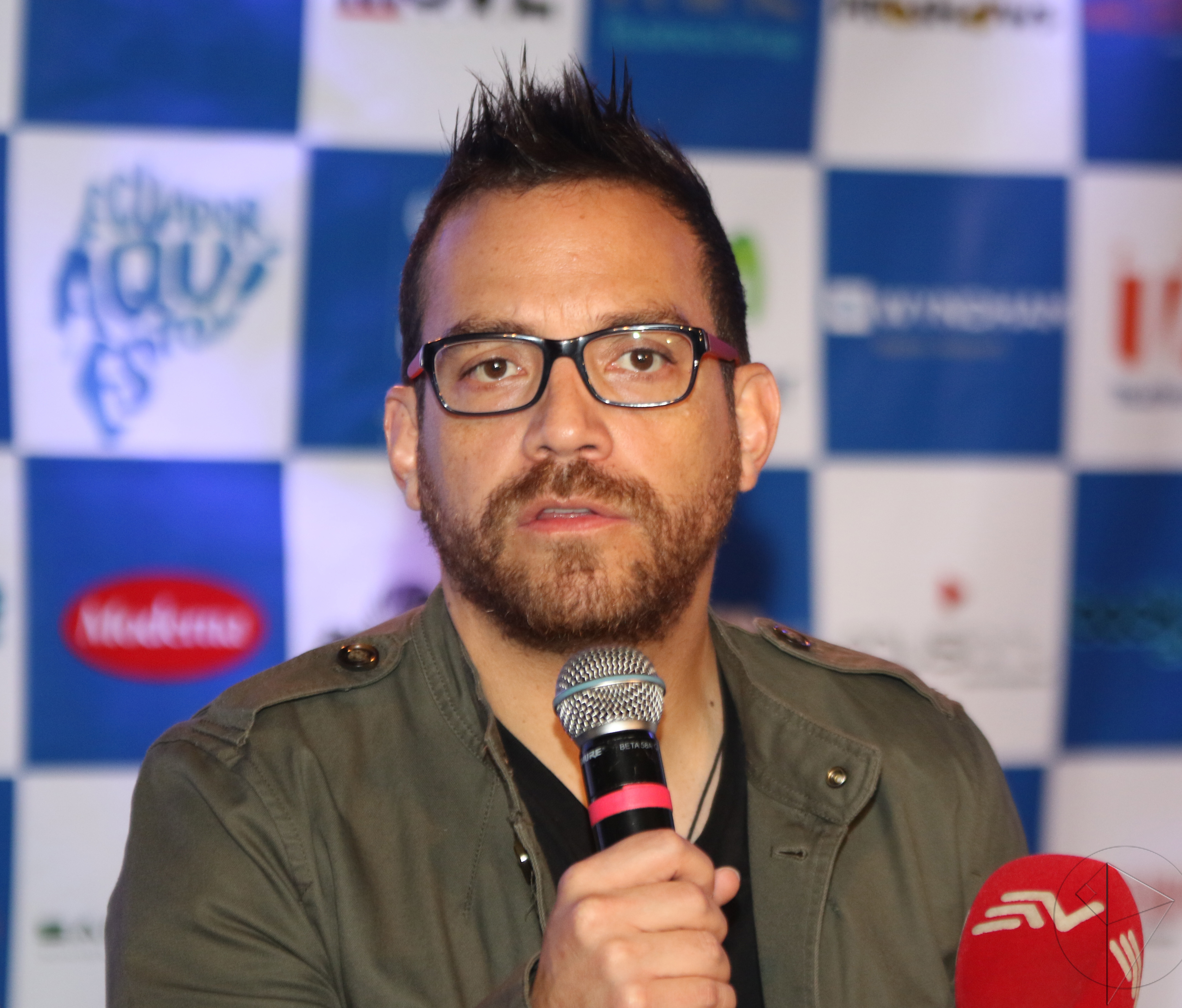

Background information
- Born: January 17, 1972 (age 54)
- Origin: Quito, Pichincha, Ecuador
- Genres: Latin
- Occupations: Singer, songwriter
- Instruments: Vocals, guitar
- Years active: 1988–present
- Label: Union Music Group
- Website: juanfernandovelasco.com

Juan Fernando Velasco Torres (born January 17, 1972, in Quito, Ecuador) is an Ecuadorian musician.

== Biography ==
Juan Fernando Velasco was born January 17, 1972, in Quito, Ecuador. He has had three albums in which some of the most popular songs are Ecuadorian Pasillo.

=== Second album ===
In 2002, Velasco released his second album, Tanto amor. The album reached platinum status in Ecuador and Colombia and also was a success in other countries. The songs "Chao Lola", "Dicen", "Hoy que no estás", "Si alguna vez te amé", and "Salud" were in the first places on the charts in Ecuador, Colombia, Panama, Guatemala and Costa Rica.

In 2004, he received the "Orden Vicente Rocafuerte" – the highest award granted by the Ecuadorian government to an artist. He was also named "Peace Ambassador" by the Interamerican Platform of Human Rights.

=== Initial works ===
Velasco's music career started when he, together with some school friends, created the band "Tercer Mundo" (Third World), which became well known in Ecuador. After ten years with the band, he decided to continue his career alone. In 1999 he released his first solo album, Para que no me olvides. The album became an instant success, qualified for the Viña del Mar festival in Chile, and was later certified gold. The song "Para que no me olvides" became a hit in Colombia.

=== Present ===
Since 2005, Velasco lives in Miami. In 2007, he released his third album called A tu lado. The album features contributions by Jorge Villamizar (ex member of the group Bacilos) and the rapper Gerardo Mejía and the participation of well-known musicians and engineers like Pichón Dal Mont, Mario Breuer, Xavier Garza, Carlos Villavicencio and the Grammy award-winning producer Andrés Castro. The disc was nominated in 2007 for the MTV Latin Awards (Mexico, October 18, 2007) and also for the Latin Grammy Awards (Las Vegas, November 8, 2007). Invited by Juanes, Velasco was one of seven musicians who participated in the Concert "Paz Sin Fronteras" ("Peace Without Borders" in English), together with Miguel Bosé, Juan Luis Guerra, Ricardo Montaner, Alejandro Sanz and Carlos Vives. The concert took place on March 16, 2008, at the Simon Bolivar bridge in Cucuta, on the border between Colombia and Venezuela.

== Discography ==
=== Albums ===
==== Para que no me olvides (1999, Union Music) ====
1. "Lo que tu silencio otorga"
2. "Dejame"
3. "Me voy"
4. "Son uno mismo"
5. "A donde vas"
6. "Se van"
7. "Para que no me olvides"
8. "Reina"
9. "Galaxia azul"
10. "Latinoamerica"

==== Tanto amor (2002, Union Music) ====
1. "Hoy que no estas"
2. "Chao Lola"
3. "Dicen"
4. "Si alguna vez te ame"
5. "De rodar y rodar"
6. "Tarjetitas"
7. "El aguacate"
8. "Tanto amor"
9. "A tajitos de caña"
10. "Dame un instante"
11. "Angel de luz"
12. "Salud"

==== A tu lado (2007, Union Music) ====
1. "A tu lado"
2. "Yo naci aqui"
3. "Se que te iras"
4. "Frente a frente"
5. "Si te pierdo"
6. "Cancion de las simples cosas"
7. "El alma en los labios"
8. "Sueños al hombro"
9. "Nunca"
10. "No te escuche"
11. "Si no pudiera estar"
12. "Frente a frente" (remix) Gerardo Mejia
