= Raúl Reyes =

Colombian guerilla (1948–2008)

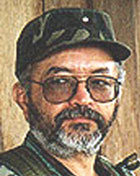
- Born: Luis Edgar Devia Silva; 30 September 1948; La Plata, Huila, Colombia
- Died: 1 March 2008 (aged 59) near Santa Rosa de Sucumbíos, Ecuador
- Military career
- Allegiance: FARC
- Rank: Member of the Central High Command
- Nickname: Raúl Reyes
- Unit: Southern Bloc
- Conflicts: Colombian armed conflict; Operacion Fenix †

Luis Edgar Devia Silva (30 September 1948 – 1 March 2008), better known by his nom de guerre Raúl Reyes, was a leader, Secretariat member, spokesperson, and advisor to the Southern Bloc of the Revolutionary Armed Forces of Colombia–People's Army (FARC–EP). He died during an attack by the Colombian army 1.8 kilometres (1.1 mi) within Ecuador, sparking the 2008 Andean diplomatic crisis involving Ecuador, Colombia and Venezuela.

== Early years ==
Reyes was born in the Colombian town of La Plata, Huila Department. Devia Silva joined the Colombian Communist Youth (JUCO) when he was 16 years old. He later joined a trade union movement while working for a Nestlé milk plant in the department of Caquetá. Devia Silva served as councilman for his home town representing the Colombian Communist Party (PCC), and was also a member of the party's Central Committee.

After becoming a member of FARC and joining its secretariat, Reyes became a prominent figure and spokesperson for the FARC, number two man in the group's seven person ruling secretariat.

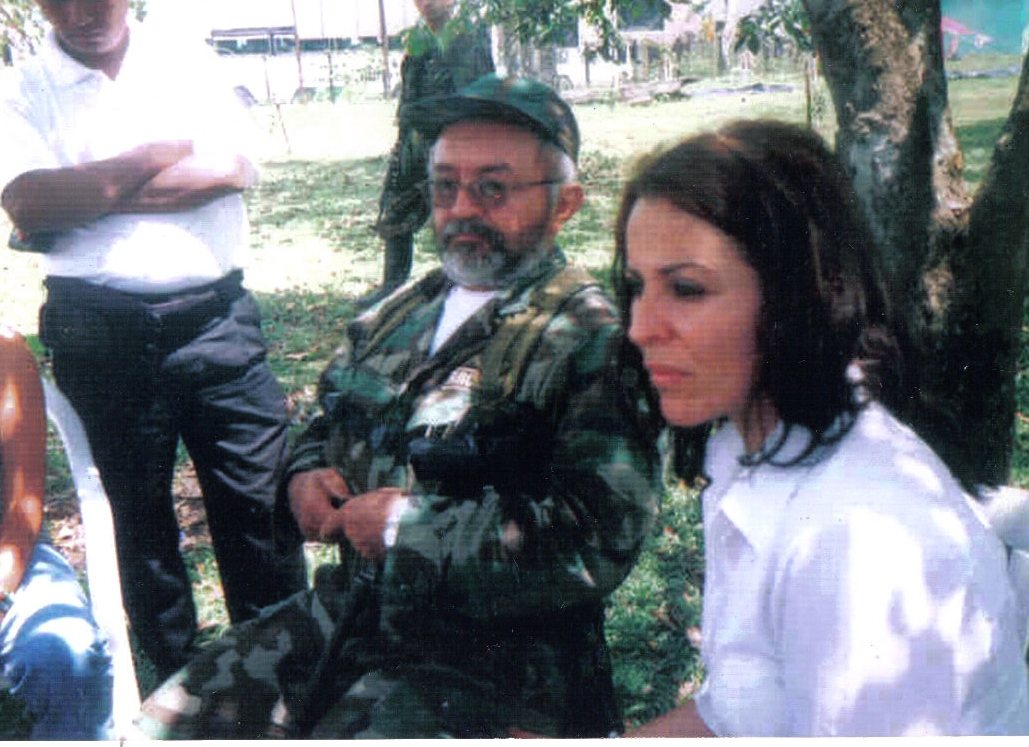
Raúl Reyes pictured during a 2001 interview.

Reyes was accused by the US Department of State and the Colombian government of expanding FARC's cocaine trafficking activities and setting related policies, including the production, manufacture, and distribution of hundreds of tons of cocaine to the United States and other countries. He was accused of promoting the "taxation" of the illegal drug trade in Colombia to raise funds for the FARC.

He had been formally sentenced in absence for the deaths of 13 policemen and 18 soldiers, 18 kidnappings and the deaths of a judge, a physician, three judicial auxiliaries, the ex-minister of Culture Consuelo Araújo, the congressman Diego Turbay and his mother, Catholic monsignor Isaías Duarte, Governor of Antioquia Guillermo Gaviria, the Colombian ex-minister Gilberto Echeverri, 11 members of the Valle del Cauca Assembly and at least four other persons. Most of these persons were kidnapped before their deaths. Gaviria, Echeverri and Araújo were killed by shots in the head when Colombian military forces stormed the camps where they were held by guerrilla insurgents. He was also found responsible for bombing Club El Nogal in Bogotá where 36 people were killed. The Government of Paraguay had asked for his extradition for his participation in the kidnapping and death of Cecilia Cubas, daughter of the ex-president of Paraguay, who was kidnapped on 21 September 2004, and whose body was found in an abandoned house in February 2005. Before his death the United States Department of State was offering a reward of up to US$5 million for information leading to his arrest. He was also included in Interpol's "red list".

Colombian authorities believed that Raúl Reyes moved through the southern Colombian frontier, especially in Putumayo Department, along the border with Ecuador. In late 2006, his possible presence in Ecuadorian territory was denounced by Colombian President Álvaro Uribe, while Ecuador's authorities rejected the claim, admitting only temporary FARC "infiltrations". Colombian Army General German Galvis repeated this claim in October 2006.

== Negotiations with Wall Street ==
In June 1999, during peace negotiations with the government of Andrés Pastrana, Reyes met in the Colombian savannah with Richard Grasso, then chairman of the New York Stock Exchange. The purpose of the meeting was to discuss investment opportunities for the FARC. The two men were photographed in an embrace which became known as the "Grasso abrazo."

== Death ==
Reyes was killed during a Colombian military operation in Granada, Putumayo Department, on 1 March 2008, against an encampment situated near Santa Rosa de Sucumbíos, on the Ecuadorian side of the border along the Putumayo River.

Previously, in February 2008, the FBI and DEA had assisted the Colombian government in tracing a satellite phone call made by Reyes to Venezuelan president Hugo Chavez in which they discussed the release of hostages. Reyes’s location was traced to an encampment located a mile across Colombia’s southern border in neighboring Ecuador — the government of which had earlier denied reports of Reyes’s presence. The attack started at 00:25. Reyes died after stepping on a FARC landmine while trying to flee the camp.

The Colombian government acknowledged the killing of Reyes and 16 more guerrillas in a guerrilla camp 1.8 kilometres (1.1 mi) inside Ecuador's border. The dead body was retrieved and transported to Colombian territory after the operation took place. Colombian soldier Carlos Edilson Hernández León was killed in action during the attack. According to a DPA report, Noticias Uno claimed that Hernández León died accidentally, due to a falling tree.

According to the Ecuadorian government the attack happened 3 kilometres (1.9 mi) from the border inside Ecuador’s territory, and it was a planned air strike followed by the incursion of Colombian troops transported by helicopters. The attack left a total of 20 guerrilla members dead in Ecuadorian territory, many of them wearing underwear or sleeping clothes. According to Ecuadorian president Rafael Correa, the Super Tucanos warplanes entered 10 kilometres (6.2 mi) in Ecuador's territory and struck while flying north, followed by troops who came by helicopters and completed the operation.

The Ecuadorian president announced that a diplomatic note would be sent in protest, claiming that the action was a violation of Ecuador's airspace. Venezuelan president Hugo Chávez called the attack "a cowardly murder", and reacted by moving troops near the border with Colombia and recalling all personnel from the Venezuelan embassy in Colombia, saying that doing something similar inside Venezuela would be a "cause for war".

Eventually the dispute did not escalate beyond a war of words. Diplomatic meetings and an apology from Colombian president Álvaro Uribe resolved the crisis a week later.

== Aftermath ==
Colombian government officials have seized documents that, according to a spokesman for EX Colombian President Álvaro Uribe, show Ecuadorian President Rafael Correa "has a relationship and commitments with FARC", and, according to the Colombian National Police Director Oscar Naranjo, Reyes had met Ecuador's minister of internal security to discuss an "interest in making official relations with the FARC".

According to Colombian authorities, the three laptop computers seized were found to hold extensive information about the FARC, their operations and connections. The Colombian government handed over the three PCs and their ancillary devices to a team of Interpol experts, for a period of two weeks. Interpol's analysis had a limited scope, toward the sole objective of certifying whether the information was altered in any way by the Colombian government, and not to examine the contents of the documents themselves. The Interpol report concluded that the key documents were unmodified,

The Interpol's list of information recovered from the devices mentions over 30,000 written documents and more than 7,000 e-mail addresses.

On 15 June 2008, Interpol issued a new press release in response to a statement by Ecuador's Foreign Ministry that the international organization considered to be incorrect. The press release stated that "[Ecuador] inaccurately suggests that Interpol had not established whether the eight seized exhibits forensically examined by Interpol's computer forensic experts had been recovered by Colombian authorities on March 1, 2008 from a FARC camp or belonged to Raul Reyes. In fact, based on a review of all the information and material provided by Colombia, including a classified oral briefing, Interpol was able to satisfy itself, and clearly stated in its report, that the seized computer exhibits it was requested to forensically examine were taken from the FARC camp on March 1, 2008 and belonged to Raul Reyes." Interpol also added "that validating the contents of the computer exhibits were not manipulated after their seizure by Colombian authorities is not in any way, shape or form the same as saying that the contents of the user files are true and accurate. Interpol therefore objects to those who suggest that Interpol's report validates the source and accuracy of any particular document or user file contained therein."

On 16 March 2010 Hugo Chávez admitted having had a meeting with Reyes at an indeterminate date during Pastrana's government.
