= Foreign policy of the Mahmoud Ahmadinejad administration =

Iranian foreign policy of the Ahmadinejad administration

The foreign policy of the Mahmoud Ahmadinejad administration was the policy initiatives towards other states by the former president of Iran, as different from past and also future of the Iranian foreign policy. Mahmoud Ahmadinejad's tenure as president came at a time of greater conflict, rhetorical or physical, than his predecessors. In following this there were various measures, external or internal, that led to his policy changes. This was primarily a division between relations with states of the Western world (led by the United States) and the rest of the world (countries such as Venezuela and the Arab countries of Lebanon and Palestine).

== Background ==
In a break with the old regime, the face of the Islamic Republic in the west was changed early in Ahmadinejad's administration via the return to Iran of "virtually the entire corps of ambassadors based in the West" — diplomats who were experienced but also quite reform-minded.

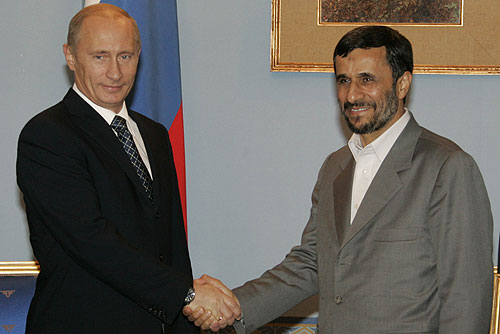
Ahmadinejad with then president of Russia Vladimir Putin in Russia

== Relations with the United States ==
During Ahmadinejad's presidency, Iran and the U.S. have had the most high-profile contact in almost 30 years. Iran and the US froze diplomatic relations in 1980 and had no direct diplomatic contact until May 2007.

While the U.S. has linked its support for a Palestinian state to acceptance of Israel's "right to exist," Iran's president Mahmoud Ahmadinejad has retorted that Israel should be moved to Europe instead, reiterating Muammar al-Gaddafi's 1990 statement. The U.S. has sent signals to Iran that its posturing against Israel's right to exist is unacceptable in their opinion, leading to increased speculation of a U.S. led attack on Iran's nuclear facilities. Even though Iran has denied involvement in Iraq, then-President Bush warned of "consequences," sending a clear message to Iran that the U.S. may take military action against it. The Bush administration considered Iran to be the world's leading state supporter of terrorism. Iran has been on the U.S. list of state sponsors of international terrorism since 1984, a claim that Iran and Ahmadinejad have denied.

On 8 May 2006, Ahmadinejad sent a personal letter to then-President George W. Bush to propose "new ways" to end Iran's nuclear dispute. U.S. Secretary of State Condoleezza Rice and National Security Adviser Stephen Hadley both reviewed the letter and dismissed it as a negotiating ploy and publicity stunt that did not address U.S. concerns about Iran's nuclear program. A few days later at a meeting in Jakarta, Ahmadinejad said, "the letter was an invitation to monotheism and justice, which are common to all divine prophets."

In 2006, Ahmadinejad also challenged George W. Bush to a live TV-debate about world affairs and ways to solve those issues. George W. Bush turned down this offer.

Ahmadinejad invited Bush to a debate at the United Nations General Assembly, which was to take place on 19 September 2006. The debate was to be about Iran's right to enrich uranium. The invitation was rejected by White House spokesman Tony Snow, who said "There's not going to be a steel-cage grudge match between the President and Ahmadinejad."

In November 2006, Ahmadinejad wrote an open letter to the American people, representing some of his anxieties and concerns. He stated that there is an urgency to have a dialog because of the activities of the US administration in the Middle East, and that the US is concealing the truth about current realities.

The United States Senate passed a resolution warning Iran about attacks in Iraq. On 26 September 2007, the United States Senate passed a resolution 76–22 and labeled an arm of the Iranian military as a terrorist organization.

In September 2007 Ahmadinejad visited New York to address the General Assembly of the United Nations. On the same trip, Columbia University invited Ahmadinejad to visit and participate in a debate. The invitation was a controversial one for the university, as was university president Lee Bollinger's introduction in which he described the Iranian leader as a "cruel and petty dictator" and his views as "astonishingly uneducated;" and for Ahmadinejad's statement in answer to a question — "We don't have homosexuals like in your country. We don't have that in our country. We don't have this phenomenon; I don't know who's told you we have it" — which prompted laughter and booing from the audience.

In a speech given in April 2008, Ahmadinejad described the 11 September 2001 attacks as a "suspect event." He minimized the attacks by saying all that had happened was, "a building collapsed." He claimed that the death toll was never published, that the victims' names were never published, and that the attacks were used subsequently as pretext for the invasions of Afghanistan and Iraq.

In October 2008, President Ahmadinejad expressed his happiness of the 2008 financial crisis and what he called "collapse of liberalism". He said the West has been driven to deadend and that Iran was proud "to put an end to liberal economy". Ahmadinejad used a September 2008 speech to the General Assembly of the United Nations to assert the American empire is soon going to end without specifying how. "The American empire in the world is reaching the end of its road, and its next rulers must limit their interference to their own borders," Ahmadinejad said.

On 6 November 2008 (two days after the 2008 US Presidential Election), Ahmadinejad congratulated Barack Obama upon election to President of the United States, and said that he "welcomes basic and fair changes in U.S. policies and conducts, I hope you will prefer real public interests and justice to the never-ending demands of a selfish minority and seize the opportunity to serve people so that you will be remembered with high esteem". It is the first congratulatory message to a new elected president of the United States by an Iranian president since the 1979 Iranian Hostage Crisis.

Since Ahmadinejad came to power Iran has stopped selling its oil in dollars, instead selling it in euros and other currencies in the Iranian oil bourse.

== Regional relations ==
Immediately after the Islamic Revolution, Iran's relations with most of its neighbors, particularly those with large Shi'a minorities, were severely strained. Ahmadinejad's priority in the region has been to improve ties with most of Iran's neighbors in order to strengthen Iran's status and influence in both the Middle East and Greater Muslim World.

Turkey has always been important in the region due to its ties to the West through NATO, Israel, and its candidate status in the European Union. Ahmadinejad visited Ankara to reinforce relations with Turkey immediately after the 2007 NIE report was released. Relations were briefly strained after President Abdullah Gul had stated that he wants the atomic threat to be eliminated from the region, perhaps a hint to Iran; however, business has remained cordial between the two countries. Despite US disapproval, they signed a multibillion-dollar gas pipeline deal in late 2007.

Iran's relations with the Arab states have been complex, partly due to the Islamic Revolution of decades ago, as well as more recent efforts by the United States to establish a united front against Iran over the nuclear issue and war on terror. Ahmadinejad has sought reconciliation with the Arab states by encouraging bilateral trade and posturing for Iranian entry into the Gulf Cooperation Council. Outside the Persian Gulf, Ahmadinejad has sought to reestablish relations with other major Arab states, most notably Egypt. As of 2007, Iran did not have an open embassy there.

Iran's ties to Syria have been most notable in the West. Both nations have had to deal with international and regional isolation. Both have cordial ties to the militant group, Hezbollah, and concerns over Iran-Syria relations were further exacerbated following the 2006 Lebanon War, which both Ahmadinejad and President Assad claimed as a victory over Israel.

Ahmadinejad has also tried to develop stronger, more intimate ties with both Afghanistan and Pakistan, to ensure "regional stability." In particular, Ahmadinejad is interested in more bilateral talks between Iran and both Afghanistan and Pakistan. His administration has helped establish the "peace pipeline" from Iran that will eventually fuel both Pakistan and India. In theory, the plan will help to integrate South Asian economies, and, thus to calm tensions between Pakistan and India.

Ahmadinejad met foreign minister Elmar Mammadyarov of Azerbaijan to discuss increased cooperation between the two nations. Mammadyarov also expressed desire to expand the north–south corridor between Iran and Azerbaijan and to launch cooperative projects for power plant construction. Iran has also redoubled efforts to forge ties with Armenia; during Ahmadinejad's visit in October 2007 the discussions were focused on developing energy ties between the two countries.

=== Egypt ===
Under his tenure and since the 2011 Egyptian revolution, ties have grown closer between the two countries. Iranian naval vessels crossed the Suez Canal for the first time since the Islamic revolution and he made the first visit by an Iranian president since the Islamic revolution to Egypt in February 2013.

=== Lebanon ===
Ahmadinejad has been a consistent supporter of Lebanon vis-a-vis Israel, and has supported Hezbollah's right of resistance.

Ahmadinejad planned to visit Lebanon in October 2010, after his trip was previously delayed. The visit came amidst concern from the United States, Israel, and a section of the March 14 alliance such as Samir Geagea. The Jerusalem Post said that during a visit to the south, Ahmadinejad planned to throw rocks across the border "to demonstrate his hatred" towards Israel.

His Lebanese counterpart, Michel Suleiman, however, asserted Lebanon's right to host foreign dignitary. The March 8 alliance's parliamentary leader Michel Aoun also came out in support of the visit and hit back at Israel and the US' reactions saying they were "disgraceful and offensive," while lauding Iran because "[since] the revolution, Iran has always been backing Lebanon. We can see that not only in words but in actions. [Iran is] backing Lebanon with nothing in return." Hezbollah's Deputy Secretary General Sheikh Naim Qassem hailed the visit as having succeeded before it starts and that since Suleiman invited him "Lebanon wants this visit to consolidate relations and ties between Lebanon and the Islamic Republic of Iran." Other ministers and a former minister also hailed the visit.

=== Afghanistan ===
Due to the similar culture and language Iran has with Afghanistan, the two countries have historically been close and, even though the US has a military presence in Afghanistan, President Hamid Karzai of Afghanistan maintains he wants Iran to be one of its closest allies. At Camp David in August 2007, Karzai rejected the U.S. claim that Iran backs Afghan militants. Karzai described Iran as "a helper and a solution," and "a supporter of Afghanistan", both in "the fight against terror, and the fight against narcotics". He called relations between Afghanistan and Iran "very, very good, very, very close ". Al-Arabiya television said "Shi'a Iran has close ethnic and religious ties with Afghanistan."

=== Iraq ===
Ahmadinejad was the first Iranian president to visit Iraq. Ahmadinejad, in Baghdad 2 March 2008 for the start of a historic two-day trip, said that "visiting Iraq without the dictator Saddam Hussein is a good thing." Heading home after a two-day visit to Iraq, Ahmadinejad again touted his country's closer relations with Iraq and reiterated his criticism of the United States.

=== Azerbaijan ===
During his tenure relations with neighbours to the north and west were increased as well. Despite Iran being the second largest producer of natural gas, a deal was signed between the two state companies to import Azeri gas to Iran. In an effort to build support around Iran in the face of increasingly heated rhetoric the two countries also signed a security agreement to deal with "such diverse subjects as border security, the war on drugs, organized crime and human trafficking, and the extradition of criminals." The Iranian Interior Minister said "The security of Azerbaijan is the security of Iran and the security of Iran is the security of Azerbaijan. We have no limitation for transferring experiences and training Azerbaijan's forces." Adding that the threat from elsewhere was such that "Aliens do not want to see friendship among the regional states and seek to sow discord among nations through various issues." In like measure, Azerbaijani Defense Minister, Safar Abiyev, "No threat will be made against Iran from Azerbaijan's territory and we will not help the enemies of the Islamic Republic of Iran under any circumstances."

=== Turkey ===
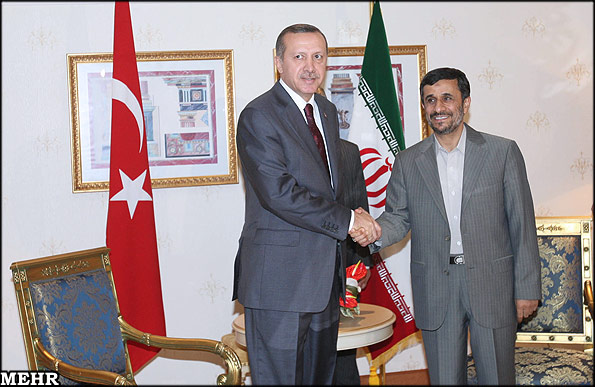
Ahmadinejad with Prime Minister of Turkey Recep Tayyip Erdoğan in Tehran on 20 August 2009.

Iran's ties with Turkey, particularly after the rise of the Justice and Development Party led by Recep Tayyip Erdoğan were enhanced. Prime minister Erdoğan said regarding the nuclear crisis in the Middle East: "Countries with nuclear weapons are not in a position to turn to another country and say: 'You are not supposed to produce nuclear weapons. Iran has consistently spoken of the fact that it is seeking to use nuclear energy for civilian purposes and that they are using uranium enrichment programmes for civilian purposes only. That is what Mr Ahmadinejad has told me many times before." Erdoğan's good personal relationship with Ahmedinejad was used to increase commercial ties as well as bring Iranian hydrocarbons to European markets. Erdoğan also claimed Iran sought Turkey's help in reaching out to the United States. He made common cause with the Iranians over the issue of PKK and Iranian Kurdish rebels of PJAK afflicting both countries, while condemning Iraq's refusal to hand over Kurdish suspects, as well as lauding Iran's willingness to share information on the matter.

=== Russia ===
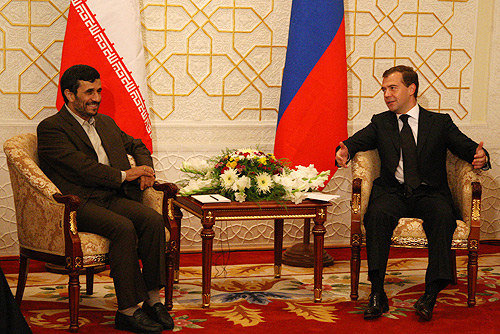
Ahmadinejad with President of Russia Dmitry Medvedev in Moscow on 28 August 2008.

Ahmadinejad has moved to strengthen relations with Iran's northern neighbor Russia, setting up an office expressly dedicated to the purpose in October 2005. He has worked with Vladimir Putin on the nuclear issue, and both Putin and Ahmadinejad have expressed a desire for more mutual cooperation on issues involving the Caspian Sea. More recently, Iran has been increasingly pushed into an alliance with Moscow due to the controversy over Iran's nuclear program. By late December 2007, Russia began to deliver enriched batches of nuclear fuel to Iran as a way of persuading Iran to end self-enrichment.

=== Israel ===
On 26 October 2005 Ahmadinejad gave a speech at a conference in Tehran entitled "The World Without Zionism". According to widely published translations, he agreed with a statement he attributed to Ayatollah Khomeini that the "occupying regime" had to be removed, and referred to it as a "disgraceful stain [on] the Islamic world", that needed to be "wiped from the pages of history."

Ahmadinejad's comments were condemned by major Western governments, the European Union, Russia, the United Nations Security Council and then UN Secretary General Kofi Annan. Egyptian, Turkish and Palestinian leaders also expressed displeasure over Ahmadinejad's remark. Canada's then Prime Minister Paul Martin said, "this threat to Israel's existence, this call for genocide coupled with Iran's obvious nuclear ambitions is a matter that the world cannot ignore".

The translation of his statement has been disputed. Iran's foreign minister stated that Ahmadinejad had been "misunderstood": "He is talking about the regime. We do not recognise legally this regime." Some experts state that the phrase in question (بايد از صفحه روزگار محو شود) is more accurately translated as "eliminated" or "wiped off" or "wiped away" (lit. "should disappear") from "the page of time" or "the pages of history", rather than "wiped off the map". Reviewing the controversy over the translation, The New York Times deputy foreign editor Ethan Bronner observed that "all official translations" of the comments, including the foreign ministry and president's office, "refer to wiping Israel away". Dr. Joshua Teitelbaum, an Israel-based professor with ties to the American Israel Public Affairs Committee, in a paper for the Jerusalem Center for Public Affairs, examined the language that President Ahmadinejad has used when discussing Israel. Using Persian translations from Dr. Denis MacEoin, a former lecturer in Islamic studies in the United Kingdom, Teitelbaum wrote that "the Iranian president was not just calling for "regime change" in Jerusalem, but rather the actual physical destruction of the State of Israel," and asserted that Ahmadinejad was advocating the genocide of its residents as well. Teitelbaum said that in a speech given on 26 October 2005, Ahmadinejad said the following about Israel: "Soon this stain of disgrace will be cleaned from the garment of the world of Islam, and this is attainable." Teitelbaum said that this type of dehumanizing rhetoric is a documented prelude to genocide incitement. Dr. Juan Cole, a professor of modern Middle Eastern and South Asian history at the University of Michigan, has argued that Ahmadinejad was not calling for the destruction of Israel, "Ahmadinejad did not say he was going to wipe Israel off the map because no such idiom exists in Persian". Dr. Stephen Walt, a professor of international affairs at Harvard University has said "I don’t think he is inciting to genocide." According to Gawdat Bahgat of the National Defense University, "the fiery calls to destroy Israel are meant to mobilize domestic and regional constituencies" and that "Rhetoric aside, most analysts agree that the Islamic Republic and the Jewish state are not likely to engage in a military confrontation against each other."

In July 2006, Ahmadinejad compared Israel's actions in the 2006 Israel-Lebanon conflict to Adolf Hitler's actions during World War II saying that "like Hitler, the Zionist regime is just looking for a pretext for launching military attacks" and "is now acting just like him." On 8 August 2006, he gave a television interview to Mike Wallace, a correspondent for 60 Minutes, in which he questioned American support of Israel's "murderous regime" and the moral grounds for Israel's invasion of Lebanon. On 2 December 2006, Ahmadinejad met with Palestinian prime minister Ismail Haniyah in Doha, Qatar. At that meeting, he said that Israel "was created to establish dominion of arrogant states over the region and to enable the enemy to penetrate the heart Muslim land." He called Israel a "threat" and said it was created to create tensions in and impose US and UK policies upon the region. On 12 December 2006, Ahmadinejad addressed the International Conference to Review the Global Vision of the Holocaust, and made comments about the future of Israel. He said, "Israel is about to crash. This is God's promise and the wish of all the world's nations."

When CNN's Larry King asked Ahmadinejad "does Israel remain Israel" in his version of the Middle East, Ahmadinejad suggested that throughout the Palestinian territories free elections for all be conducted under the supervision of international organizations. Ahmadinejad suggested that "..we must allow free elections to happen in Palestine under the supervision of the United Nations. And the Palestinian people, the displaced Palestinian people, or whoever considers Palestine its land, can participate in free elections. And then whatever happens as a result could happen."

While speaking at a gathering of foreign guests marking the 19th anniversary of the death of Iran's late revolutionary leader, Ayatollah Ruhollah Khomeini, the official IRNA news agency quoted Ahmadinejad as stating that

"You should know that the criminal and terrorist Zionist regime which has 60 years of plundering, aggression and crimes in its file has reached the end of its work and will soon disappear off the geographical scene."

Alternatively, the Iranian presidential website quotes Ahmadinejad as saying

"O dear Imam (Khomeini)! You said the Zionist Regime that is a usurper and illegitimate regime and a cancerous tumor should be wiped off the map. I should say that your illuminating remark and cause is going to come true today. The Zionist Regime has lost its existence philosophy... the Zionist regime faces a complete deadend and under God's grace your wish will soon be materialized and the corrupt element will be wiped off the map."

== Relations with Latin American countries ==
=== Bolivia ===
As one of the countries in the Latin American "pink tide," Bolivia consolidated relations with Iran during Ahmadinejad's presidency. Bolivian president Evo Morales visited Iran in 2010, where, together with the Iranian president Mahmoud Ahmadinejad, he said there was a need to "strengthen the resistance front formed by independent and freedom-seeking nations to fight against imperialism and global hegemony."

=== Brazil ===
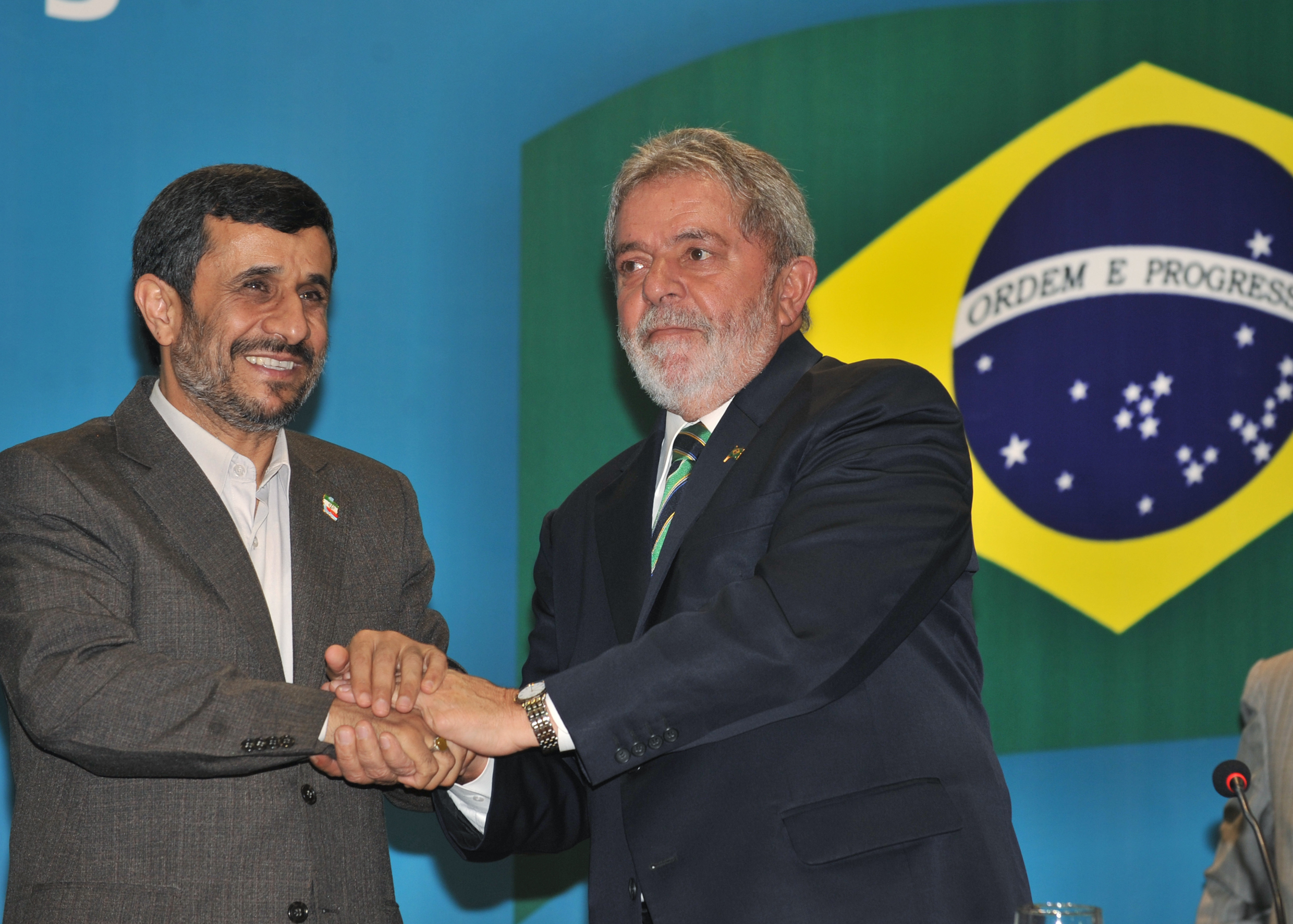
Ahmadinejad with president of Brazil Luiz Inácio Lula da Silva in Brasília

Brazilian president Lula and Ahmadinejad have talked of their "personal relationship" that helped to boost ties between Brazil and Iran. Ahmadinejad first visited Brazil on a Latin American tour that took him to Venezuela and Bolivia, while Lula was involved in a landmark breakthrough in getting uranium produced in Iran to Turkey to be enriched and avoid another round of sanctions. Lula's effort was not seen as likely to solve the problem by U.S. Secretary of State Clinton.

Ahmadinejad visit

There was some controversy over Iran's involvement in the Rio+20 conference. Iran sent a delegation, which included President Ahmadinejad, to Rio in June to attend the summit. The controversy of Iranian attendance at the summit surrounded Iran having serious environmental issues, which it has refused to address, continuing human rights violations and is refusing to cooperate with the IAEA over its contentious nuclear program. Ahmadinejad was met with demonstrations, attended by thousands of people, on his arrival in Rio.

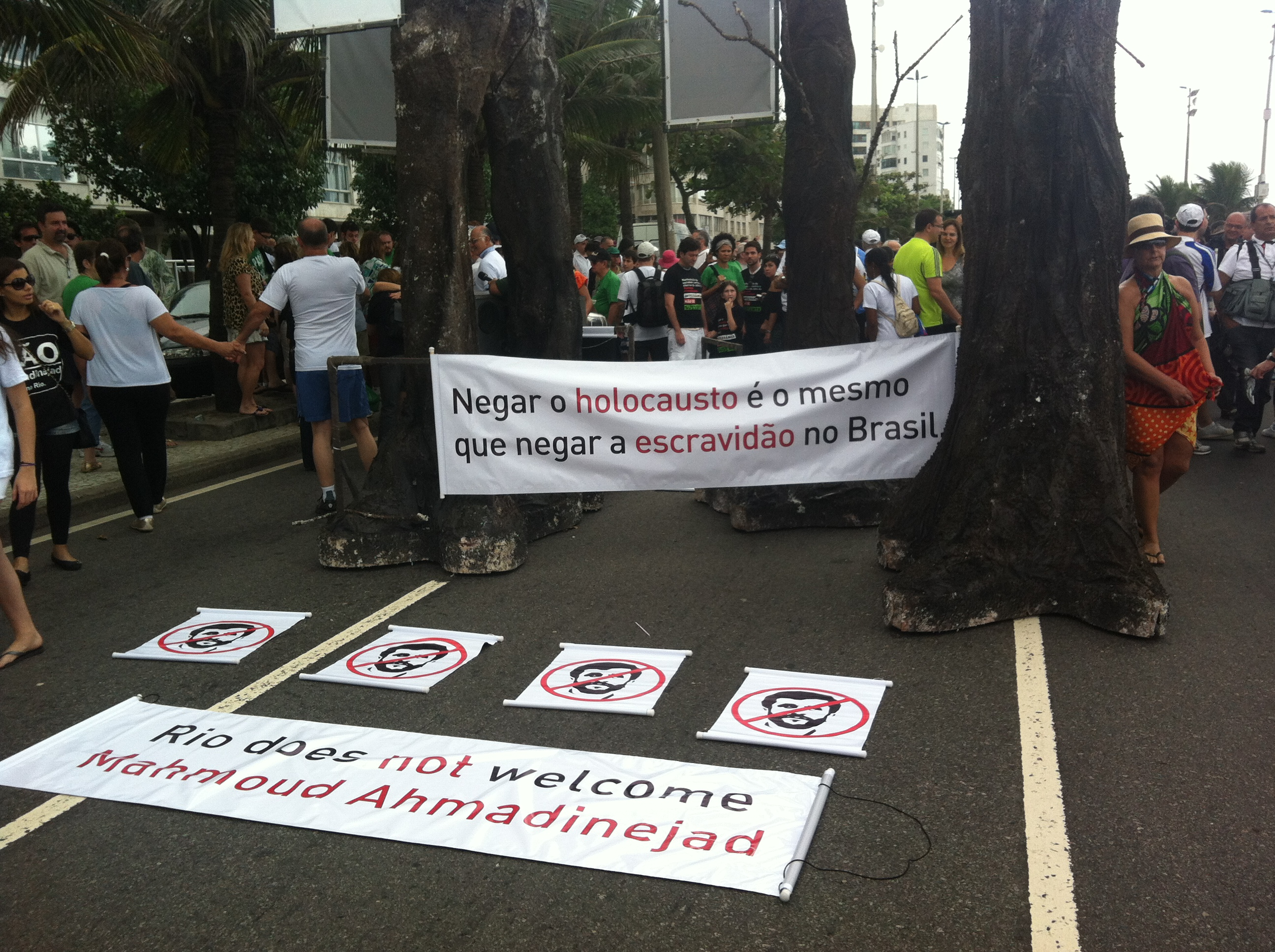
Activists protest the presence of Ahmadinejad at the Rio+20 summit.

The Iranian delegation were met with protesters waving banners with the slogan "Ahmadinejad go home" on their arrival in Rio on 20 June. The demonstrators were mostly made up of human rights activists, homosexuals and Jews demonstrating against Iran's violation of human rights and their unresolved environment issues. Several states boycotted Iran through walking out during Ahmadinejad's speech, including Canada. A Canadian representative for the Environment Minister Peter Kent, who led the delegation, said that their walkout was designed to "...send a strong message to Iran, and to the world, that Canada will not tolerate Iran's radical and dangerous rhetoric." Other delegations, including the US, Israel, Australia, the UK, and the European Union, also boycotted the Iranian president's speech.

Brazilian president Dilma Rousseff rejected a meeting request from Iranian president Mahmoud Ahmadinejad and other representatives followed her example and Rio Mayor Eduardo Paes canceled the inauguration of a replica of the famed Persepolis columns offered by Iran. The event had been scheduled with the presence of the Iranian leader. As well as problems surrounding air pollution in Tehran and other large cities, there are concerns that the Iranian nuclear program will cause damage to the environment. Worries include the location of several nuclear facilities. The Bushehr Nuclear Power Plant, for example, which was launched in November 2010, is situated in an area of severe seismic risk. It is located at the intersection of three plates (Arab, African and Eurasian) and experts have argued that an earthquake could cause such damage to the building at Bushehr (and equipment within) that there would be an accident on a similar scale to Chernobyl. Kuwaiti geologist Jasem al-Awadi has warned that radiation leaks could have a serious impact on the Gulf region, particular Kuwait, as it is only 276 km from the Bushehr Plant.

=== Venezuela ===
Ahmadinejad has sought to develop ties with other world leaders that are also opposed to U.S. foreign policy and influence like Hugo Chavez of Venezuela. Venezuela voted in favor of Iran's nuclear program before the United Nations, and both governments have sought to develop more bilateral trade. Venezuela is still not one of Iran's major trading partners.

During a 2010 visit to Iran, Chavez and Ahmadinejad signalled an intention to establish a "new world order."

=== Rest of Latin America ===
Ahmadinejad also visited Nicaragua for the inauguration of Daniel Ortega in January 2008, and again in January 2012 where he signed multimillion-dollar deals to fund infrastructure projects. He did the same in Bolivia for Evo Morales. While, he has solidified ties with Ecuador to the point that President Rafael Correa said his country was "punished for ties with Iran."

== United Nations ==
On 23 September 2009, Ahmadinejad gave a speech to the UN General Assembly which focused on accusing Western powers of spreading "war, bloodshed, aggression, terror and intimidation" in the Middle East and Afghanistan. He also promised that Tehran was "prepared to warmly shake all those hands which are honestly extended to us". But he accused the West of hypocrisy — saying it preached democracy yet violated its fundamental principles — and added that it was time for the world to respond.

"The awakening of nations and the expansion of freedom worldwide will no longer allow them to continue their hypocrisy and vicious attitudes," he said.

He also spoke out against Israel for its "barbaric" attack on the Gaza Strip, "inhuman policies" in the Palestinian territories and what he called its domination of world political and economic affairs. The end of which focused largely on the plight of the people of Palestine and a blaming of Israel, though without mentioning the nation or Jews, referring only to "the occupiers" and "the Zionist regime".

"How can the crimes of the occupiers against defenseless women and children... be supported unconditionally by certain governments," Ahmadinejad asked. "And at the same time, the oppressed men and women be subject to genocide and heaviest economic blockade being denied their basic needs, food, water and medicine?"

"It is no longer acceptable that a small minority would dominate the politics, economy and culture of major parts of the world by its complicated networks," he added. And he accused the so-called Zionist regime of seeking to "establish a new form of slavery, and harm the reputation of other nations, even European nations and the US, to attain its racist ambitions." His remarks culminated in France leading a walkout of a dozen delegations, including the United States in protest. "It is disappointing that Mr Ahmadinejad has once again chosen to espouse hateful, offensive and anti-Semitic rhetoric," Mark Kornblau, spokesman to the US mission to the United Nations, said in a statement. Delegations from Argentina, Australia, Britain, Costa Rica, Denmark, France, Germany, Hungary, Italy, New Zealand and the United States left the room as Ahmadinejad began to rail against Israel. Israel had already called for a boycott of the speech, and was not present when the Iranian leader began his address. Canada had already said it would heed the boycott call.

== Controversies ==
=== 11 September ===
During the opening session of the 65th General Assembly of the United Nations in New York City, Ahmadinejad gave three possible theories about the 11 September attacks.

- "That a very powerful and complex terrorist group, able to successfully cross all layers of the American intelligence and security, carried out the attack." (which he said was advocated by mainstream American statesmen)
- "That some segments within the U.S. government orchestrated the attack to reverse the declining American economy and its grips on the Middle East in order also to save the Zionist regime." (Which he said the majority of the Americans and other countries and politicians' agreed to)
- "It was carried out by a terrorist group but the American government supported and took advantage of the situation." (something he said had few proponents)

His evidence was "a few passports found in the huge volume of rubble and a video of an individual whose place of domicile was unknown but it was announced that he had been involved in oil deals with some American officials. It was also covered up and said that due to the explosion and fire no trace of the suicide attackers was found." Then he asked:

- Would it not have been sensible that first a thorough investigation should have been conducted by independent groups to conclusively identify the elements involved in the attack and then map out a rational plan to take measures against them?
- Assuming the viewpoint of the American government, is it rational to launch a classic war through widespread deployment of troops that led to the death of hundreds of thousands of people to counter a terrorist group?
- Was it not possible to act the way Iran countered the Riggi terrorist group who killed and wounded 400 innocent people in Iran. In the Iranian operation no innocent person was hurt.

Consequently, he proposed an independent UN fact-finding commission. The allegations was met with a walkout by the US, Canada, Israel and the 27-member EU bloc.

=== "Wiped off the map" ===
During a 2005 speech, controversy circulated in the media that Ahmadinejad stated Israel should be "wiped off the map". This phrase is an English idiomatic expression which implies physical destruction. Juan Cole, a University of Michigan Professor of Modern Middle East and South Asian History, believes Ahmadinejad's statement was inaccurately translated; Cole says that a more accurate translation would be:

The Imam said that this regime occupying Jerusalem (een rezhim-e ishghalgar-e qods) must vanish from the page of time (bayad az safheh-ye ruzgar mahv shavad).

The New York Times deputy foreign editor and Israeli resident Ethan Bronner wrote that Ahmadinejad had called for Israel to be wiped off the map. After noting the objections of critics such as Cole, Bronner stated:

All official translations of Mr. Ahmadinejad's statement, including a description of it on his website, refer to wiping Israel away. Sohrab Mahdavi, one of Iran's most prominent translators, and Siamak Namazi, managing director of a Tehran consulting firm, who is bilingual, both say "wipe off" or "wipe away" is more accurate than "vanish" because the Persian verb is active and transitive.

Despite these differences, Ethan Bronner does agree with Professor Cole that Ahmadinejad did not use the word "Israel" (but rather "regime over Jerusalem") and also did not use the word "map" (but rather "page(s) of time"). Emphasizing these points of agreement, Jonathon Steele from the Guardian concludes that "experts confirm that Iran's president did not call for Israel to be 'wiped off the map'". Furthermore, Steele cites a source at the BBC, as well as the Middle East Media Research Institute (MEMRI), supporting the following translation:

This regime that is occupying Jerusalem must be eliminated from the pages of history.

While this translation is quite similar to Professor Cole's version, it does use the word "eliminated" rather than "vanish", which is consistent with Bronner's suggestion that an "active" verb would more accurately reflect the original Persian.

The official website of Mahmoud Ahmadinejad translates the phrase as "wiped off the map," Reuters translates that speech as "will soon disappear off the geographical scene"

=== Western response to Holocaust questioning and alleged anti-Semitism ===
On 14 December 2005, Ahmadinejad made several controversial statements about the Holocaust, repeatedly referring to it as a "myth," as well as criticizing European laws against Holocaust denial. According to a report from Islamic Republic of Iran Broadcasting, Ahmadinejad said, referring to Europeans, "Today, they have created a myth in the name of Holocaust and consider it to be above God, religion and the prophets." The quote has also been translated as "They have created a myth today that they call the massacre of Jews and they consider it a principle above God, religions and the prophets."

In a 30 May 2006 interview with Der Spiegel, Ahmadinejad insisted there were "two opinions" on the Holocaust. When asked if the Holocaust was a myth, he responded "I will only accept something as truth if I am actually convinced of it." He also said, "We are of the opinion that, if a historical occurrence conforms to the truth, this truth will be revealed all the more clearly if there is more research into it and more discussion about it". He then argued that "most" scholars who recognized the existence of the Holocaust are "politically motivated," stating that:

"...there are two opinions on this in Europe. One group of scholars or persons, most of them politically motivated, say the Holocaust occurred. Then there is the group of scholars who represent the opposite position and have therefore been imprisoned for the most part."

In August 2006, the Iranian leader was reported to have again cast doubt on the existence of the Holocaust, this time in a letter to German chancellor Angela Merkel, where he wrote that the Holocaust may have been invented by the Allied powers to embarrass Germany. During the same month, in a public speech that aired on the Iranian News Channel (IRINN), Ahmadinejad reportedly implied that Zionists may not be human beings, saying "They have no boundaries, limits, or taboos when it comes to killing human beings. Who are they? Where did they come from? Are they human beings? 'They are like cattle, nay, more misguided.'”

On 11 December 2006 the "International Conference to Review the Global Vision of the Holocaust" was held in Iran. The conference was called for by and held at the request of Ahmadinejad. Western media widely condemned the conference and described it as a "Holocaust denial conference" or a "meeting of Holocaust deniers", though Iran maintained that it was not a Holocaust denial conference, commenting the conference was meant to "create an opportunity for thinkers who cannot express their views freely in Europe about the Holocaust".

In his September 2007 appearance at Columbia University, Ahmadinejad stated "I'm not saying that it didn't happen at all. This is not judgment that I'm passing here" and that the Holocaust should be left open to debate and research like any other historical event.

At the 18 September 2009 Quds Day ceremonies in Tehran, he stated that "the pretext for establishing the Zionist regime is a lie, a lie which relies on an unreliable claim, a mythical claim, (as) the occupation of Palestine has nothing to do with the Holocaust". He also referred to the Holocaust as a sealed "black box" asking why western powers refuse permission for the claim to be "examined and surveyed," a statement which was immediately condemned by the US, UK, French and German governments.

In response to some of Ahmadinejad's controversial statements, the U.S. Senate, accused Ahmadinejad of anti-Semitism. Ahmadinejad's September 2008 speech to the UN General Assembly, in which he dwelled on what he described as Zionist control of international finance, was also denounced as "blatant anti-Semitism" by German Foreign Minister Frank-Walter Steinmeier.

American president Barack Obama posed a direct challenge to Ahmadinejad during his June 2009 visit to Buchenwald concentration camp, saying that Ahmadinejad "should make his own visit" to the camp and that "[t]his place is the ultimate rebuke to such thoughts, a reminder of our duty to confront those who would tell lies about our history".

In October 2008, Ahmadinejad's statements on the Holocaust were criticized within Iran by cleric and presidential hopeful Mahdi Karroubi.

Khamenei's main adviser in foreign policy, Ali Akbar Velayati, refused to take part in Ahmadinejad's Holocaust conference. In contrast to Ahmadinejad's remarks, Velayati said that the Holocaust was a genocide and a historical reality.

==== Response to accusations ====
Ahmadinejad has denied accusations of Holocaust denial, and has stated that he is simply highlighting the issue of free speech and the right to research. "If the Europeans are telling the truth in their claim that they have killed six million Jews in the Holocaust during the World War II – which seems they are right in their claim because they insist on it and arrest and imprison those who oppose it, why the Palestinian nation should pay for the crime. Why have they come to the very heart of the Islamic world and are committing crimes against the dear Palestine using their bombs, rockets, missiles and sanctions.

Ahmadinejad has said he respects Jews and that "in Palestine there are Muslims, Christians and Jews who live together". He added, "We love everyone in the world – Jews, Christians, Muslims, non-Muslims, non-Jews, non-Christians... We are against occupation, aggression, killings and displacing people – otherwise we have no problem with ordinary people." Ahmadinejad has further said the Jewish community in Iran has its own independent member of parliament. Ahmadinejad has argued Zionists are "neither Jews nor Christians nor Muslims", and has asked "How can you possibly be religious and occupy the land of other people?"

Shiraz Dossa, a professor at St. Francis Xavier University, in Nova Scotia, Canada, argued in June 2007 that

Ahmadinejad has not denied the Holocaust or proposed Israel’s liquidation; he has never done so in any of his speeches on the subject (all delivered in Persian). As an Iran specialist, I can attest that both accusations are false... What Ahmadinejad has questioned is the mythologizing, the sacralization, of the Holocaust and the "Zionist regime’s" continued killing of Palestinians and Muslims. He has even raised doubts about the scale of the Holocaust. His rhetoric has been excessive and provocative. And he does not really care what we in the West think about Iran or Muslims; he does not kowtow to western or Israeli diktat.

Dossa was criticized in Canadian media, by university president Sean Riley, and by 105 professors at his university for his attendance at Tehran's Holocaust conference. Dossa replied he did not know Holocaust deniers would be in attendance, that he has "never denied the Holocaust, only noted its propaganda power", and that the university should respect his academic freedom to participate.
