= Ecuador–Iran relations =

- Iran: Ecuador

The Republic of Ecuador and the Islamic Republic of Iran maintain foreign relations. During the presidencies of Rafael Correa and Mahmoud Ahmadinejad in the 21st century, relations between the two countries were restored and strengthened. Iran has an embassy in Quito; while Ecuador closed its embassy in Tehran in 1978 prior to the Iranian Revolution.

== History ==
The Venezuelan government, as represented by President Hugo Chávez, helped foster ties between Iran and Ecuador.

In a December 2008 visit to Tehran, Ecuadorian President Rafael Correa signed several agreements. Correa announced that both countries would open embassies in each other's capitals by January 2009.

As a result of the diplomatic conflict with Colombia over the raid of an alleged FARC camp in Ecuador, Correa is reported to have discussed the possibility of an arms deal with Iran. As a member of ALBA, Correa participated in a joint declaration of support to the Iranian government in June 2009.

After the left-wing regime of Rafael Correa, Ecuador-Iran relations have worsened significantly. In September 2025, Ecuadorian President Daniel Noboa signed an executive decree, designating Iran’s Islamic Revolutionary Guard Corps (IRGC) as a terrorist organization.

== Military relations ==
Due to the new approach in foreign policy under Correa, Ecuador looked to non-tradition partners for their arms supplies. While Ecuador was the first foreign country to buy arms for Indian weapons manufacturers, it also looked to Iran to procure armaments. Due to the 2008 Andean diplomatic crisis with Colombia, Correa said Ecuador had "a very serious problem on the northern border with Colombia, an irresponsible government that does not take care of its border. We need to equip ourselves… Iran can supply us and help us with credit."

== Economic relations ==
Economic ties have grown during the Correa and Ahmadinejad administration. Like other nations in Latin America, Iran has extended financing for a host of projects. Ecuador, in turn, has become the primary importer of Iranian products, having replaced Peru. Trade between the two went from a paltry $8m to $168m from 2007 to 2008.

In 2009, Iran provided a US$40 million loan to Ecuador to help finance the building of two power plants.

In a 2010 visit to Iran, the Ecuadorian Vice President, Lenin Moreno, signed an agreement with his Iranian counterparts to construct three hydroelectric centers using Iranian technology. He also affirmed Iranian support for the Ecuadorian Yasuni-ITT program to receive international funds in order not to transition to sustainable energy.

Ecuador and Iran have also cooperated in the port, agriculture and auto industries.

== American backlash against Ecuador ==
In 2010, the Financial Action Task Force (FATF) named both Ecuador and Iran as countries failing to comply with international regulations against money laundering and financing terrorism. It said Ecuador had not "constructively engaged" with the body and was "not committed" to global standards on money crimes. Correa was quick to condemn the move: "What arrogance! And why? Because we have relations with Iran. That's it. This is imperialism in its most base form. ... This has nothing to do with the struggle against money laundering. We have been blacklisted along with Iran, Ethiopia, Angola and North Korea. We are the financiers of terrorism in the world!” Correa said indignantly. He added "it's a stick so you don't misbehave, naughty boy. You didn't do what I said, don't get involved with Iran. So because you went ahead, we'll put you on the blacklist, that's all. He asked why no pressure was added on rich countries like the United States and Switzerland over money laundering in their financial systems. He also added that Ecuador's bank had adequate legislation to protect from laundering and terrorism financing and called the report "a huge lie."

Meanwhile, Ecuador's private bank association also said the Iran factor was behind the country's inclusion on the FATF list citing a 2009 agreement between Ecuador's Central Bank and some Iranian financial institutions. However, Ecuador maintained its ties with Iran would not change.

Ecuadorian Central Bank President Diego Borja also traveled to the United States to dispel concerns about the Iranian central bank's plans to deposit 40 million euros with Ecuador's central bank.

=== Continued support ===
Despite US pressure, Correa affirmed commitment to the relationship saying "we [Ecuadorians] have nothing against Iran. Iran has done nothing to us." He later said "[we are] not going to stop getting closer to Iran because (the United States) has it on a black list." Ecuador also affirmed support, along with various other international pariah states, for Iran's nuclear programme.

After an attempted coup on Correa in 2010, the two countries signaled intentions to deepen ties.

== See also ==
- Foreign relations of Ecuador
- Foreign relations of Iran
