= Foreign policy of the Rafael Correa administration =

The foreign policy of the Rafael Correa administration (2007-2017) was the policy initiatives towards other states by the former President of Ecuador, as differed to past, or future, Ecuadorian foreign policy. Correa's foreign policy was somewhat similar to that of the other leaders of the Bolivarian Alternative for the Americas (ALBA) such as Hugo Chavez and Evo Morales. This entailed a rough division between relations with other states of the Americas (led by the United States) and the rest of the world (namely Iran).

== Background ==
Rafael Correa took his first term of office as president of Ecuador on 4 December 2006 by the country's electoral court. This inauguration was attended by most regional leaders, as well as the Iranian President and Spanish Crown Prince. His second term was commenced on 10 August 2009, the same day as Ecuador's bicentennial. The second term took place amongst greater fanfare with several South American dignitaries in attendance, such as President of Argentina Cristina Fernández de Kirchner, President of Bolivia Evo Morales, President of Cuba Raúl Castro and President of Venezuela Hugo Chávez. Correa continued to reiterate a promise to continue the "socialist revolution," his plans to end poverty and to continue "stamping out the structural causes of poverty." He also said the actions of the media were opposing his government.

== Economic moves ==
=== Repudiation of Ecuador's foreign debt ===
Correa has called for a renegotiation of Ecuador's $10.2 billion external debt, at 25% of GDP, following the example of Argentine President Néstor Kirchner. In his inaugural address on 15 January, Correa stated his belief that part of Ecuador's external debt is illegitimate, because it was contracted by military regimes. He also denounced the "so-called Washington Consensus." Correa has threatened to default on Ecuador's foreign debt, and to suspend review of the country's economy by the World Bank and the International Monetary Fund; indeed, on April 26, 2007, he ordered the expulsion from Ecuador of the World Bank's country manager.

In May 2007, evidence surfaced that some of the Ecuadorian government rhetoric might have been part of an alleged market manipulation to benefit Ecuador from movements in the price of financial instruments linked to Ecuadorian Bonds. A fall in Ecuador bond prices, ignited by aggressive default rhetoric, would trigger a buyback by Ecuador, financed by Venezuelan banks. This strategy collapsed due to operations engaged by Venezuelan financial institutions who profited from the market swings. Correa referred to the allegations as a conspiracy from a powerful banker. On July 26, 2007, Rafael Correa replaced finance minister Patiño, due to Patiño's appearance in a video recording, apparently discussing the market manipulation. Patiño then assumed a newly created position responsible for the Pacific coast region and later assumed the Politics Affairs Ministry.

Correa's political orientation has helped foster ties with Venezuela, which supported Ecuador on several projects. But with the 2008 financial crisis and Ecuador's looming default on $510 million of bonds, there was rumor of a possible rift. The drop in the price of Ecuador's biggest export, oil, forced the country to use a 30-day grace period to decide whether to make a $30 million interest payment that was due on November 15. Venezuela apparently owns structured securities tied to Ecuador's bonds that would then force Venezuela to pay $800 million if Correa does not make the payment. Venezuela's potential losses may cause a strain in relations between two, who meet every three months and espouse similar socialist themes. An analyst from Barclays said "Chavez will have something to say...[He] will encourage Correa not to default."

On December 12, Correa said that an interest payment due on Ecuador's national debt would not be made. He declared the country in default: "We are ready to accept the consequences". He described the debt as "immoral", saying the government would take its findings that past debt sales were tainted by graft and bribes to international courts.

In a radio address on December 13, Correa said that he wants to force a “big discount” on creditors, whom a day earlier he called “true monsters who won’t hesitate to crush the country”.

"I have lost sleep over this ... this will cost us tears and sweat but I think we are doing the right thing." Correa, who endorses anti-debt NGO Jubilee 2000's slogan "life before debt", is popular among Ecuadorians for his stance against foreign investors. He has already forced foreign companies to change contract terms in the oil and mining industries and ejected a major Brazilian building company in a dispute over a dam construction as he seeks to increase state income.

==== Buy back bonds ====
On April 16, 2009, Finance Minister Maria Elsa Viteri embarked on a trip to Europe in a mission to present Ecuador's offer to buy back global bonds 2012 and 2030 at 30% of their current value. Bond holders had until mid-May (extended to June 3) to accept or make an offer. According to the Finance Minister, at least 70% of bond holders have accept the governments' offer. On May 29, Ecuador made a payment of approximately 300 million dollars to part of the bond holders. The Finance Minister has said that on June 13, the government will reveal all the details of the repurchase. According to government reports, all or almost all of the bonds will be retired from the global market at a price of 30-35 on the dollar. These bonds constitute one fourth of Ecuador's debt. If Ecuador is able to retire these bonds, it would reduce the nation's debt by $2 billion, making this a great economic victory for president Rafael Correa and his administration.

On June 11, 2009, Ecuador announced that it had successfully bought 91% of the bonds at a cost of 30-35 cents to the dollar. The Finance Minister said that the remaining bond holders will have another opportunity to sell their bonds at the same price of 35%. This move will nominally reduce the total foreign debt by $2 billion (although it might lead to losing access to private financial markets in the future).

== Summit of the Americas ==
During the sixth Summit of the Americas in Cartagena, Colombia in 2012, Correa said Ecuador would boycott the event due to the exclusion of Cuba and the lack of discussion on "essential issues;" however he added that this was not a slight on Colombia or Santos.

== Relations with specific countries ==
=== China ===
Correa has stated that relations with China are extremely good and strategic for the country. He has maintained that it is “good business” to obtain credits with interests of 7% to finance projects with a profitability between 23% and 25%. He also complained that these types of operations were demonised and denied that Ecuador is beholden to, or has mortgaged, its petroleum trade with China. Correa stated that in 2006, 75% of Ecuadorian petroleum went to United States, in exchange for nothing. “Now we have 50% of the committed petroleum with China, in exchange for thousands of millions of dollars to finance the development of this country.”

On January 2, 2010, Correa and his Chinese counterpart, Hu Jintao, exchanged congratulatory messages to celebrate the thirtieth anniversary of the establishment of diplomatic relations between both countries.

In 2012, China loaned Ecuador 240 million dollars for the purpose of overhauling the Ecuadorian security system. This system comprises 4,300 new surveillance cameras, drones, automated evidence processing systems, and increased manpower to manage each of these new technologies, which have been collectively dubbed the ECU 911 Integrated Security Service. Much of this new hardware has been developed in Ecuador, but in laboratories designed and set up by China National Electronics Import and Export Corporation (CEIEC), which is a state-owned company and a subsidiary of national defence contractor China Electronics Corporation (CEC). The CEC has also undertaken similar surveillance overhauls in Venezuela and Bolivia, and has also introduced technology to monitor the Amazon Rainforest in Brazil. The Ecuadorian government has highlighted the benefits of this extensive security system, which has been installed across the nation's 24 provinces. They argue that it has been able to decrease the response time for everyday emergencies such as life-threatening illness, and have cited the system as a large factor in the dramatic drop in crime in Ecuador since its installation. Some individuals have expressed concern about the nature and the pervasiveness of these technologies, however, and how they may be used to create an Ecuadorian police state.

=== Colombia ===
Correa withdrew his government's ambassador in Bogotá, Colombia, and ordered troops to the country's border following the 2008 Andean diplomatic crisis in early March 2008. On 3 March 2008, Colombia's police said that documents found in a camp in Ecuador where Colombian troops killed Raul Reyes, a top guerrilla boss, showed ties between the FARC rebels and Correa, including contacts about political proposals and local military commanders. Correa denied the accusations, calling them lies. Correa also said that a deal to release political prisoners – including former Colombian Sen. Ingrid Betancourt – was nearly complete before the 1 March 2008 Colombian raid into his country. On 5 March 2008, Correa and Venezuelan president Hugo Chavez met to discuss Colombia's attack and made a series of accusations against Colombia's government. During the meeting, Correa dismissed Colombia's president Álvaro Uribe as just a "puppet" while others are the "puppet masters".

At a Rio Group summit held in Santo Domingo, Dominican Republic, on 7 March 2008, after a heated exchange of accusations between Correa and Uribe, the diplomatic crisis was temporarily resolved with Colombia's apologies for the attack and reassurances that it won't be repeated. Correa said that with this resolution Latin America was starting a new era where international principles of justice will have preeminence over power.

Currently, there are no diplomatic nor consular relations between Colombia and Ecuador. Correa has declined to resume diplomatic relations until Colombian government fulfill these five conditions:
1. Send an apology for the attack, which has been already done.
2. Send more troops to the south border of Colombia, now in hands of guerrillas and regular criminal bands.
3. Stop trying to link Ecuadorian government with FARC guerrillas.
4. Avoid using chemical products on the common border, which has caused several injuries on the local population, both Colombian and Ecuadorian, and
5. Help with the expenses for Colombian refugees on Ecuadorian soil. Ecuador is the country with the highest number of foreign refugees on the occidental hemisphere.

=== India ===
On 16 November 2008, Foreign Minister Maria Isabel Salvador met her Indian counterpart, Pranab Mukherjee, with a close relationship in oil and defence between these geographically distant countries high on the agenda. On the oil front, the new government in Ecuador reversed an earlier revenue-sharing agreement with Western oil companies and sought to strike a new partnership agreement with state-owned ONGC Videsh.

In the defence sector, Ecuador became the first country to sign a contract for purchasing the Indian made Dhruv helicopter of which one will be for use by Correa. The Indian embassy appointed a Military Attache amid brighter prospect for cooperation and more defence exports, as Ecuador has agreed to be the servicing hub in South America for Indian defence equipment.

=== Iran ===
Ecuador and Iran resumed diplomatic relations in the first year of Correa presidency. In December 2008, Correa visited Tehran and signed several agreements. Responding to the intrusion of Colombian forces earlier that year, Correa is reported to have discussed the possibility of an arms deal with Iran. As a member of ALBA, Correa participated in a joint declaration of support to the Ahmadinejad government in June 2009.

=== Venezuela ===
Ecuador officially joined the Bolivarian Alliance for the Americas, a Venezuelan-initiated regional cooperation initiative, in June 2009.

=== United States ===
Since Rafael Correa came to power, the close and strategic relationship between Ecuador and the United States deteriorated and has since been marked by tension and mistrust. On repeated occasions, Correa has announced Ecuador's unwillingness to renew a lease on the Eloy Alfaro Air Base to United States Southern Command. SOUTHCOM has the contractual right to leave a year after that date, but has announced it plans to vacate by September 2009. He told Oliver Stone in South of the Border that:

We love the United States very much. I lived there. I studied there. We love the people of the United States very much. But obviously, the US foreign policy is questionable. That’s why when they want to pressure us to maintain their military base in our country, a foreign base that they don’t pay anything for, either, and they accuse us of being extremists because we don’t want the base—if there’s no problem having foreign military bases in a country, we set a very specific condition: we would keep the North American base in Manta, provided they let us put a military base in Miami. If there's no problem with foreign bases, then we should be able to have one over there.

On February 7, 2009, Ecuador–U.S. relations soured particularly after Correa ordered the expulsion of US Immigration and Customs Enforcement attaché Armando Astorga for allegedly suspending $340,000 in annual aid because Ecuador would not allow the US State Department to veto appointments to the anti-smuggling police. He cited as evidence a letter Astorga allegedly sent (January 8) demanding that the anti-contraband police return all donated equipment. Subsequently, on February 17, Mark Sullivan, the US Embassy's first secretary in the embassy's office of regional affairs was given 48 hours to leave the country because of his "unacceptable meddling." Foreign Minister Fander Falconí said Sullivan, in a meeting with police in early February, questioned a decision by Ecuadorean Police Chief Jaime Hurtado to transfer the head of the Special Investigations Unit to another police post.

On 4 April 2011, relations between the two countries deteriorated further when Correa's government declared Ambassador Heather Hodges to be persona non grata and asked her to leave the country as soon as possible. The action came after the leak by WikiLeaks of a State Department cable implying that Correa must have been aware of the alleged corruption of General Jaime Hurtado when he appointed Hurtado the commanding general of the Ecuadorian National Police (ENP). The cable stated that, prior to Hurtado's appointment, the US embassy had "multiple reports that indicate he used his positions to extort bribes, facilitate human trafficking, misappropriate public funds, obstruct investigations and prosecutions of corrupt colleagues, and engage in other corrupt acts for personal enrichment.... Hurtado's corrupt activities were so widely known within the upper ranks of the ENP that some Embassy officials believe that President Correa must have been aware of them when he made the appointment. These observers believe that Correa may have wanted to have an ENP Chief whom he could easily manipulate." CNN reported that the Ecuadorian government had called the allegation that Correa knowingly promoted a corrupt officer to head the police "unacceptable, malicious and reckless."

In 2013, relations between the two countries sank to a new low after Ecuador lashed out at threats from the U.S. to revoke a preferential trade agreement offering duty-free access to the U.S. market in regards to the political asylum request of Edward Snowden. Instead, Ecuador "unilaterally and irrevocably" withdrew from the agreement itself saying it would not be blackmailed by the U.S. It also offered the US$23 million it notionally gains from the agreement to the U.S. for human rights training.

== After Correa 2017- ==
Following the election in 2017 of Lenin Moreno, from the same party as Correa (Alianza PAÍS), the new period has been marked by a re-approximation with the US, moving away from previous allies such as Venezuela and Cuba, and the progressive abandonment of regional integration spheres such as UNASUR and CELAC.
