= Arab League–Iran relations =

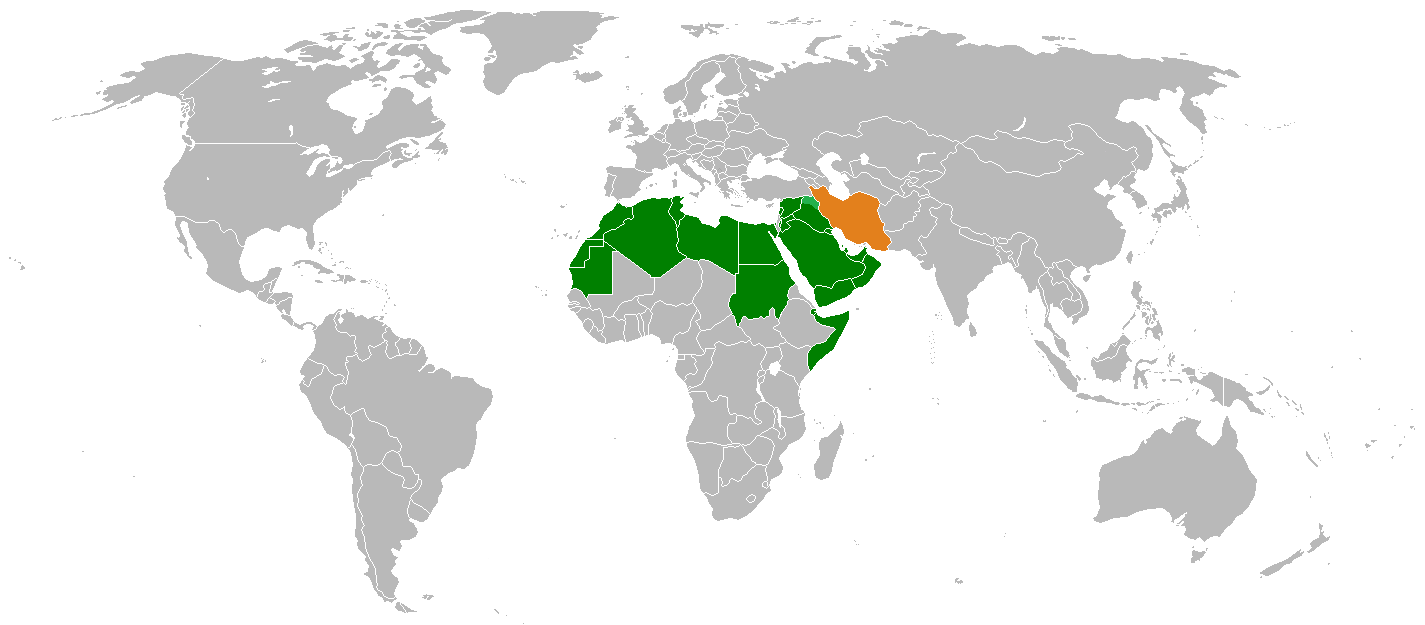

- Arab League: Iran

The dynamic between the League of Arab States and the Islamic Republic of Iran has been ambivalent, owing to the latter's varying bilateral conduct with each country of the former. Iran is located on the easternmost frontier of the Arab League, which consists of 22 Arab countries and spans the bulk of the Middle East and North Africa, of which Iran is also a part. The Arab League's population is dominated by ethnic Arabs, whereas Iran's population is dominated by ethnic Persians; and while both sides have Islam as a common religion, their sects differ, with Sunnis constituting the majority in the Arab League and Shias constituting the majority in Iran. Since Iran's Islamic Revolution in 1979, the country's Shia theocracy has attempted to assert itself as the legitimate religious and political leadership of all Muslims, contesting a status that has generally been understood as belonging to Sunni-majority Saudi Arabia, where the cities of Mecca and Medina are located. This animosity, manifested in the Iran–Saudi Arabia proxy conflict, has greatly exacerbated the Shia–Sunni divide throughout the Muslim world.

Within the Middle East, the Arab–Iranian relationship has rotated between peaceful co-existence and open hostility. The Iran–Iraq War remains the most recent instance of a direct armed conflict between an Arab League country and Iran. Some Arab League countries, especially those with Shia-dominated governments, have been perceived as more closely affiliated with Iran than with the Arab League itself. Among other phenomena, this reality has significantly impacted the Arab–Israeli conflict in recent years, as the mutual threat presented by Iran to Israel and many Arab countries has enabled the formation of the so-called Arab–Israeli alliance, which came to fruition in light of the Iran–Saudi Arabia proxy conflict and the Iran–Israel proxy conflict; many Arab countries have normalized diplomatic ties with Israel in pursuit of regional security against the Iranian government's military and political ambitions, effectively breaking from the long-running Arab League boycott of Israel.

== History ==
=== Iran's Islamic Revolution ===
After the Iranian Revolution the foreign policy of Iran changed dramatically. In many cases diplomatically inimical Arab nations became more cooperative with Iran, while some formerly supportive nations decreased their support.

Ruhollah Khomeini, leader of the revolution, founder of the Islamic Republic of Iran, and its first Supreme Leader, declared that "The concept of monarchy totally contradicts Islam." Therefore, Arab leaders developed a hostile attitude towards the Islamic Republic of Iran. Khomeini's idea of supporting the mustazafeen (those who are wronged or oppressed) – as opposed to the mustakbareen (those who are arrogant) – led to many problems with neighboring countries due to some Arab regimes being judged by Iranian jurists to be among the mustakbareen. Ayatollah Khomeini was open about his intention to export the revolution to other parts of the Muslim world.

=== 1980s: Iran–Iraq War ===
During the early 1980s, Iran was isolated regionally and internationally. This diplomatic and economic isolation intensified during the Iran–Iraq War in which almost all neighboring Arab states, except Syria, supported Iraq logistically and economically. According to some observers, Saddam Hussein fought on behalf of other Arab states that viewed Iran as a potential threat to their stability.

In the late 1980s and early 1990s, the revolutionary zeal cooled, and a degree of pragmatism was adopted by Iranian policymakers.

=== 1990s ===
During the presidency of Akbar Hashemi and Mohammad Khatami, Iranian foreign policy switched to reducing international tensions and Iran tried to normalize its relations with its Arab neighbors. When the United States attacked Iraq in the Gulf War of the early 1990s, it unintentionally promoted Iran's political influence in the Middle East.

=== 2000s: Iraq War ===
Since the 2000s, the situation has changed completely. The most significant factor was the United States administration's decision to invade Iraq in 2003, which led to the fall of Saddam, a Ba'athist Leader with pan-Arab sympathies who was determined to balance Shi'a Iran's regional influence. With the deposition of Saddam, Iran found a major obstacle to its expansion removed. This gave Iran a good chance to emerge as a major player in the Middle East.

As Richard Haass stated in 2006, "Iran will be one of the two most powerful states in the region. ... The influence of Iran and groups associated with it has been reinforced." Iran could find allies in Arab world comprising Syria, Lebanon, Kuwait and Iraq. On the other hand, Saudi Arabia, Jordan and United Arab Emirates united against Iran, with support from the United States. Other Arab countries continued to have normal relations with Iran.

Another aspect of tension between Iran and Arab countries has been sectarianism. During the early days of the Iranian Revolution, Ayatollah Khomeini endeavored to bridge the gap between Shias and Sunnis by forbidding criticizing the Caliphs who preceded Ali. He also declared it permissible for Shiites to pray behind Sunni imams. However, the influence of Iran on Shiite communities outside its borders and the territorial disputes with Arab neighbors among other issues remain sources of tension in Arab-Iranian relations.

=== 2010s ===
Diplomatic cables leaked In 2010 revealed Arab leaders singled out Iran as the greatest threat to regional stability, yet refuse to speak publicly, telling US diplomats in private, they would face domestic troubles if they were seen as siding with the West against a Muslim country. The cables showed that Saudi Arabia and Bahrain supported a military attack against Iran aimed to stop the Iranian nuclear program.

On 4 January 2016, Saudi Arabia and Bahrain severed diplomatic ties with Iran. Saudi Arabia cited attacks on the Saudi embassy in Tehran following predominantly Sunni Saudi Arabia's execution of a Shiite cleric. Bahrain cited Iran's "blatant and dangerous interference" in Bahrain and other Arab countries.

=== 2020s ===
In 2026, the Gulf Countries and Jordan were attacked by Iran during the 2026 Iran War. Lebanon was directly engaged in a conflict with Israel and Iraq is attacked by both Israel and Iran.

== Arab–Iranian relations by country ==
=== Algeria ===
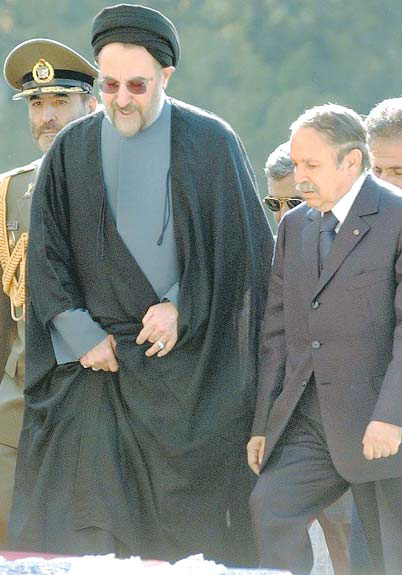
Mohammad Khatami welcoming Abdelaziz Bouteflika, 19 October 2003, Tehran.

Following the Iranian Revolution, in 1981 Algeria's role was instrumental in the release of the US diplomatic hostages held in Iran. In 1998, Iran became increasingly critical of Algeria's heavy-handed security forces, especially during several massacres during the Muslim holy month of Ramadan and led efforts to pressure Algeria to act more humanely through the international community. Algeria in turn blamed Iran for the massacre.

After a decade, in early September 2000, diplomatic and trade relations between Algeria and Iran were re-established in a decision made by Iranian President Mohammad Khatami and his Algerian counterpart Abdelaziz Bouteflika on the sidelines of the United Nations Millennium Summit. The resumption of relations paved the way for number of agreements "on bilateral cooperation in the areas of judicial affairs, finance, industry, and air transport". Relations continued to strengthen rapidly after that to the extent that in 2002 Iranian Defense Minister Ali Shamkhani and Algerian Joint Chief of Staff Muhamed al-Imari Wednesday signed an agreement for military and technical cooperation in Iran. In the recent 2006 UN vote on Iran's nuclear program, Algeria abstained from voting.

=== Bahrain ===
Iran had a historic claim to Bahrain until March 1970 when Shah Mohammad Reza Pahlavi abandoned the claim as a result of secret Anglo-Iranian negotiations. Following this realignment of policy, the two countries signed a demarcation agreement in 1970.

Following the Iranian Revolution, Bahraini Shia fundamentalists in 1981 orchestrated a failed coup attempt under the auspices of a front organization, the Islamic Front for the Liberation of Bahrain. The coup would have installed a Shia cleric exiled in Iran, Hujjat al-Islam Hādī al-Mudarrisī, as supreme leader heading a theocratic government. The Bahraini Government unofficially regarded the coup as Iran attempting to overthrow their Sunni government. Iran denied all knowledge saying the fundamentalists were inspired by the Iranian revolution but had received no support from Iran. Fearful of a recurrence, the episode caused Bahrain to crack down on its Shia population putting thousands into jail and further souring relations with Shia Iran. Recently the countries are beginning to enjoy closer relations again and have engaged in many joint economic ventures. Iran has been severely critical of Bahrain hosting the US navy Fifth Fleet within the Persian Gulf.

In August 2015, Bahraini authorities announced arresting of five members of a terrorist group which was linked to at least one bombing attack in Bahrain and was believed to accept aid and training from Lebanese Hezbollah and Iran-based Revolutionary Guards.

On 4 January 2016, Bahrain severed diplomatic relations with Iran, citing Iran's "blatant and dangerous interference" in Bahrain and other Arab countries. This directly followed Saudi Arabia's dissolution of diplomatic ties with Iran.

=== Comoros ===
In 2014, AFP reported that the Libyan and Iranian embassies in Moroni, Comoros had problems with registering their claim to the property in the capital Moroni, because Comoros gave the same property to both countries for building their embassies. In January 2016, Comoros recalled their ambassador from Iran in an expression of cooperation and solidarity with Saudi Arabia.Ahmed Abdallah Mohamed Sambi, one of the former presidents of Comoros was a graduate from the Islamic seminaries at Qom, Iran. According to the Tehran-based Tabnak news agency, while Sambi was there, he studied under Ayatollah Mesbah Yazdi.

=== Djibouti ===
In November 2014, Iranian Parliament (Majlis) Speaker Ali Larijani inaugurated new building of Djibouti Parliament built by Iran. Djibouti cut its diplomatic ties with Iran out of solidarity with Saudi Arabia after Riyadh cut off diplomatic relations with Iran on 3 January 2016.

The countries had previously signed trade agreements to increase trade in 2005. In 2006, while on an official visit to Iran, Djiboutian president Ismaïl Omar Guelleh stated that Iran had expressed interest in expanding cooperation on defense issues in the future. In the same year the President also supported Iran's right to use nuclear energy for peaceful purposes.

=== Egypt ===
In 1939, diplomatic relations between Egypt and Iran were upgraded to ambassadorial level, and Youssef Zulficar Pasha was appointed as Egypt's first ambassador in Tehran. In the same year, Princess Fawzia of Egypt, the sister of King Farouk I, married Mohammad Reza Pahlavi, the then crown prince (later Shah) of Iran. The relationship between Iran and Egypt had fallen into open hostility under Gamal Abdel Nasser presidency. Following his death in 1970, President Sadat turned this around quickly into an open and cordial friendship. In 1971, Sadat addressed the Iranian parliament in Tehran in fluent Persian, describing the 2500-year-old historic connectivity between the two nations. Overnight, Egypt and Iran were turned from bitter enemies into fast friends. The relationship between Cairo and Tehran became so friendly that the Shah of Iran (Persia), Mohammad Reza Pahlavi, called Sadat his "dear brother." After the 1973 war with Israel, Iran assumed a leading role in cleaning up and reactivating the blocked Suez Canal with heavy investment. Iran also facilitated the withdrawal of Israel from the occupied Sinai Peninsula by promising to substitute with free Iranian oil the loss of the oil to the Israelis if they withdrew from the Egyptian oil wells in Western Sinai. All these added more to the personal friendship between Sadat and the Shah of Iran.

Once again, relations between the two countries collapsed with the sudden eruption of the Iranian Revolution in Iran in 1978–79. When the Shah fell, Egypt was bound to disapprove of his replacement, Ruhollah Khomeini, who returned the sentiment in full measure. Furthermore, in 1979, Anwar Sadat infuriated the new Iranian government by welcoming Mohammad Reza Pahlavi, the exiled Shah of Iran, for a short, but indefinite, stay. In 1979, Iran officially cut all ties with Egypt. This move was a response to the 1978 Camp David Accords, as well as Egypt's support for Iraq in the Iran–Iraq War. In 1981, Iran symbolically dedicated a street to Khaled Islambouli, Sadat's assassin.

While trade relations slowly improved during the 1990s, Khaled al-Islambouli was honored for a second time in 2001 "with a huge new mural" in Tehran. Two years later, in late 2003, Iranian President Mohammad Khatami met with the Egyptian President Hosni Mubarak in Geneva. Khatami openly invited Mubarak to Iran, but Mubarak refused to make such a trip or normalize relations until all "public tributes" to Islambouli were "erased". In early 2004, Iran agreed to change the offending street name to Muhammad al-Durrah, a 12-year-old Palestinian boy.

In 2010, WikiLeaks leaked diplomatic cables which revealed that Mubarak expressed animosity toward Iran in private meetings, saying the Iranian leaders are "big, fat liars", and that Iran's backing of terrorism is "well-known". According to one American report, Mubarak views Iran as the primary long-term challenge facing Egypt, and an Egyptian official said that Iran is running agents inside Egypt in an effort to subvert the Egyptian regime.

Hani Suleiman, a political analyst (in a conversation with Al-Masry Al-Youm): The meeting between the presidents of the Islamic Republic of Iran and Egypt, on the sidelines of the Riyadh meeting is considered to be very significant because of some issues, because the mentioned meeting is regarded the first meeting between the heads of these 2 countries after a long time away. Likewise, considering the continuation of the Zionist regime's aggressions, the mentioned meeting has messages for the outside world, particularly America, Israel, and Western countries to strengthen the solidarity and closeness of the regional parties, and it is a danger for the Zionist regime and it takes the affairs out of the control of the United States.

=== Iraq ===
On 17 September 1980, after the Islamic Revolution in Iran settled down, Iraq under Saddam Hussein declared the previous settlement of border disputes with Iran null and void. Several days later on 22 September, Iraq invaded Iran in the Iran–Iraq War. Lasting until 1988, the brutal war killed over one million people and critically soured Arab–Iranian relations. In Iraq, the conflict was continually presented in a historical context as Arab versus Persian. The impact of the war was devastating to relations in the region; general Arab support for Iraq and a fear of Shia Muslims led to many disputes between Iran and the other Persian Gulf states. The war was a primary cause for the rise of anti-Arabism within Iran, which had until then been largely insignificant. The war ended with an UN-sponsored cease-fire.

=== Jordan ===
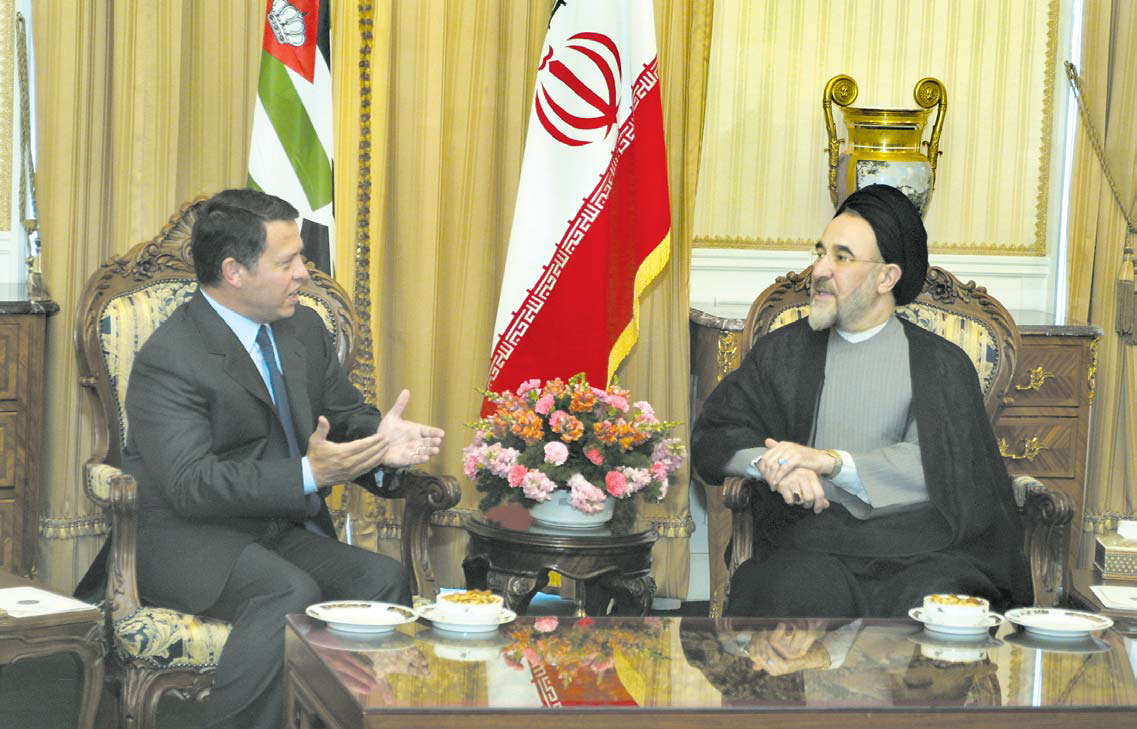
King Abdullah II of Jordan and President Mohammad Khatami, Tehran, 2 September 2003.

In 1980, Iran cut all ties with Jordan after the outbreak of Iran–Iraq War. Relations between the two nations resumed in 1991. In September 2000, King Abdullah met with Iranian President Mohammad Khatami on the sidelines of the Millennium Summit in New York. Shortly thereafter, trade between Jordan and Iran increased dramatically. According to figures from Jordan's Central Bank, "trade between Jordan and Iran reached $20 million in 2001, up some 46 percent on the previous year's $13.7 million."

On 2 and 3 September 2003, King Abdullah II visited Tehran, making him the first Jordanian king to visit "Tehran since the launching of the Islamic revolution in Iran in 1979".

=== Kuwait ===
Kuwait and Iran share close diplomatic, economic, and military ties, which is unusual for a Sunni Arab state and even more unusual for a U.S. ally even if it is sporadic. After the Iranian Revolution in 1979, Kuwaiti Prime Minister then Sabah Al-Sabah (the future Emir of Kuwait) visited Iran and congratulated the Iranian Revolution. However, this quickly turned sour when Kuwait supported Iraq on its war against Iran, and there had been no official relations between Kuwait and Iran for nearly 10 years after it started to fear about the threat from the legacy of the Iranian Revolution.

In 1990, following the Gulf War, Iraqi–Kuwaiti relations suffered bitterly and consequently Kuwaiti–Iranian relations began to greatly improve and flourish. Bilateral relations were gradually strengthened, partly because Iran and Kuwait were both invaded by Iraq and with exchanges of Iranian and Kuwaiti political and economic delegations leading to the signing of several economic and trade agreements. In February 2006, Iranian President Mahmoud Ahmadinejad visited Kuwait opening a new chapter in relations between the two countries. The well-reported visit was the first to Kuwait by a high-ranking Iranian official in 27 years.

=== Lebanon ===
Iran has close ties with Lebanon and considers it an ally. Iran also has close ties with the Lebanese political party Hezbollah and its militia force to whom it reportedly provides as much as $100 million in supplies and weaponry per year. Iran has been a staunch supporter of both Lebanon and Hezbollah against Israel.

The official Lebanese government has several agreements with the Iranian government, which includes energy cooperation. The foreign ministers of Iraq, Lebanon and Syria supported Iran's nuclear work, calling for Israel to be stripped of its nuclear arsenal. Israel is believed to have the Middle East's only nuclear weapons arsenal. Like Lebanon, Iran refuses to recognize Israel.

Following American threats to cut off funding for the Lebanese Army should it not be verified that Hezbollah would be kept from getting access to it, Lebanon's then Defense Minister Elias Murr set up a fund to ask for donations to the armed forces. A few weeks later, Lebanese president Michel Suleiman asked Iran to consider selling advanced military equipment to the Lebanese Army. Hezbollah supported the president's call. The next day, Iran's then Defense Minister Ahmad Vahidi expressed readiness to offer military aid to Lebanon.

Iranian President Mahmoud Ahmadinejad planned to visit Lebanon in October 2010, amidst controversy and pressure from the United States, Israel, and a section of the March 14 alliance such as Samir Geagea to cancel the trip. However, his Lebanese counterpart, Michel Suleiman, who had invited him, and other opposition figures hailed the visit. The March 8 alliance's parliamentary leader Michel Aoun, Hezbollah's Deputy Secretary General Sheikh Naim Qassem and former Lebanese Prime Minister Salim Hoss supported his visit.

=== Libya ===
Libya broke rank with most of the Arab countries when it came out in support of Iran during the Iran–Iraq War.

Following the collapse of the Gaddafi government in the aftermath of the 2011 Libyan Civil War, Iran was also one of the countries to recognize the National Transitional Council government.

=== Mauritania ===
In June 1987, President Maaouya Ould Sid'Ahmed Taya severed all diplomatic relations with Iran in protest of the nation's supposed refusal to negotiate an end to the Iran–Iraq War.

In recent years, Iran has been pursuing the policy on promoting relations with African countries.

In November 2024, Iran's ambassador to Mauritania, Abu Javad, met with Ould Medou, Mauritania's Minister of Culture. During the meeting, both sides expressed readiness for promoting cultural cooperation in various fields including cinema, cultural events, and training courses, among others.

=== Morocco ===
In 1981, Iran cut off all diplomatic ties with Rabat in response to King Hassan II's decision to give asylum to the exiled Shah. A decade later, diplomatic relations between the two nations were renewed, but another decade would have to pass before Abderrahmane Youssoufi, the prime minister of Morocco, would lead the first Moroccan delegation to the Islamic Republic of Iran.

The posture of Iran about the Western Sahara dispute had been heavily influenced by its diplomatic relations with the neighbouring countries, Morocco and Algeria. Since late January 1979, the deposed Shah of Persia, Mohammad Reza Pahlavi, had been granted asylum in Morocco by Hassan II, who refused to repatriate him back to Iran to be judged, causing finally the break of relations between Iran and Morocco in 1981. Previously, on 27 February 1980, Iran gave formal diplomatic recognition to the Sahrawi Arab Democratic Republic as the legitimate government of the territory of Western Sahara. The support to the Polisario Front continued during the 1980s, allowing the Sahrawi national liberation movement to open a diplomatic representation in Tehran.

=== Oman ===
Oman and Iran share close diplomatic, economic, and military ties. According to Kenneth Katzman of the Congressional Research Service, "Oman has a tradition of cooperation with Iran dating back to the Shah of Iran's regime and Oman has always been less alarmed by the perceived threat from Iran than have the other Gulf states." Unlike the majority of its Gulf neighbors, Oman managed to uphold diplomatic relations with both sides during the Iran–Iraq War from 1980 to 1988 and strongly supported UN Security Council resolutions to end the conflict. Secret cease-fire talks between the two adversaries were held in Muscat during the war, and although an agreement was never reached during these talks, they did reduce distrust on both sides. Moreover, after the war, Oman mediated talks to restore diplomatic ties between Iran and Saudi Arabia and Iran and the United Kingdom.

During the Persian Gulf War, Iran–Oman relations were damaged after Iran began running attacks on tanker movements in the Persian Gulf and placed anti-ship missile launchers along the Strait of Hormuz. The Gulf neighbors have since restored their ties and have conducted joint military exercises as recently as February 2011. Oman's leader Sultan Qaboos traveled to Iran in 2009 for the first time since Iran's 1979 revolution. Though on two occasions the U.S. has dispatched high-level officials to discuss Iran with Oman, the fact that Oman has avoided publicly expressing any concerns regarding Iran's nuclear program is likely a reason why the two states have managed to maintain strong ties.

In addition to strong diplomatic and political ties, Iran and Oman cooperate economically on several fronts, including energy. Most recently, the Gulf neighbors signed an initial agreement to begin supplying large quantities of natural gas from Iran to Oman, a project that was earlier reported to be worth between $7–12 billion. In addition to these major economic projects, the two countries have opened a joint bank to facilitate their mutual financial dealings, agreed to develop the Kish and Hengam gas fields in the Gulf, and signed a memorandum of understanding for a potential joint petrochemical project valued at $800 million.

The Omani government's official position on Iran's nuclear program is as follows: "The sultanate hopes Washington will engage in a 'direct dialogue' with Teheran to resolve the crisis over the Iranian nuclear program. The sultanate has no reason not to believe Iran's assurances that its program has purely civilian purposes. This region, no doubt, does not want to see any military confrontation or any tension".

From July 2012 to October 2013, all Iranian interests in the United Kingdom were maintained by the Omani embassy in London.

=== Palestine ===
After the Islamic Revolution, the new theocratic government brought an end to the Iran–Israel relationship; it rescinded the country's recognition of Israeli sovereignty before closing the Israeli embassy in Tehran and repurposing it for the Palestine Liberation Organization. Iran officially endorses the destruction of Israel (or the "Zionist entity"), favouring the establishment of one Palestinian state encompassing both Israel and Palestine, with Jerusalem as its capital city.

Several Palestinian militant groups, including Hamas, are close Iranian allies. The Iranian government also gives substantial assistance to the Hamas government in the Gaza Strip, which depends on foreign aid for an estimated 90% of its budget. Iranian support has not been unconditional however, and in July and August 2011, Iran cut funding to show its displeasure at "Hamas's failure to hold public rallies in support" of Syrian president Bashar al-Assad during the 2011 Syrian uprising. In part for this reason, Hamas was unable to pay the July salaries of its "40,000 civil service and security employees."

Iran sometimes formally uses the term "Occupied Palestine" (e.g., on the Iranian passport) to refer to Israel. Before the Islamic Revolution, Israel regarded Pahlavi Iran—a non-Arab power on the periphery of the Arab world—as a natural ally and counterweight to Arab ambitions as part of the "alliance of the periphery" of Israeli prime minister David Ben-Gurion.

=== Qatar ===
In 1969, Iran and Qatar signed a demarcation agreement.

Throughout the Iran–Iraq War (1980–1988), Qatar supported Saddam Hussein's Iraq financially by providing large loans and cash gifts. Iran's claim in May 1989 that one-third of Qatar's North Field gas reservoir lay under Iranian waters apparently was resolved by an agreement to exploit the field jointly.

Qatar has maintained cordial relations with Iran. In 1991, following the end of the Persian Gulf War, former emir of Qatar Hamad bin Khalifa welcomed Iranian participation in Persian Gulf security arrangements, however due to resistance from other Persian Gulf Arab States, these never came into fruition. However, Qatar maintains security cooperation with Iran through bilateral ties. Additionally, plans were being formulated in 1992 to pipe water from the Karun River in Iran to Qatar, but after local resistance in Iran this was laid to rest.

The Iranian community in Qatar, although large, is well-integrated and has not posed a threat to the regime. As of 2012, relations between the two countries were cordial.

=== Saudi Arabia ===
Following the outbreak of the Iran–Iraq War, Iranian pilgrims held a political demonstration about Saudi moving in the direction of the United States and do not take any action against Israel during the Hajj in Mecca. In 1987, they succeeded; however, Saudi police crushed the demonstration violently causing the Iranian pilgrims to riot. Immediately following the riot, Ruhollah Khomeini called for Muslims to avenge the pilgrims' deaths by overthrowing the Saudi royal family. The Saudi government blamed the riot on the Iranian pilgrims and claimed that the pilgrim riot had been part of a plot to destabilize their rule. The following day mobs attacked the Saudi embassies in Tehran.

In 2001, Iran and Saudi Arabia signed a "major security accord to combat drug trafficking and organized crime".

In 2008, the Saudi King Abdullah invited former Iranian President Ali Akbar Hashemi Rafsanjani to visit Saudi Arabia for the purpose of attending an Islamic conference. Rafsanjani responded by saying that the opportunity was a way "Iran and Saudi Arabia can resolve differences in the Muslim world." In 2010, the website WikiLeaks disclosed various confidential documents pertaining to the United States and its allies which revealed that Saudi Arabian King Abdullah urged the US to attack Iran.

The crush took place in Mina On 24 September 2015, an event described as a "crush and stampede" caused deaths estimated at well over 2,000 pilgrims. Iran had the highest number of casualties with 464 casualties. Ayatollah Ali Khamenei, the Supreme Leader of the Islamic Republic of Iran, declared three days of national mourning in Iran. The cause of the disaster remains in dispute. The Mina disaster inflamed tensions between regional rivals Saudi Arabia and Iran, which were already elevated due to the wider turmoil in the Middle East.

On 4 January 2016, Saudi Arabia severed diplomatic relations with Iran, following attacks on the Saudi embassy in Tehran after predominantly Sunni Saudi Arabia's execution of a Shiite cleric. This was directly followed by Bahrain's dissolution of diplomatic ties with Iran. Saudi Arabia influences the policies of the Arab countries.

Thus, Iran's relations with Arab countries are affected by its relations with Saudi Arabia;

On 23 April 2022, Regional rivals Iran and Saudi Arabia began negotiations in Baghdad on Saturday after they were interrupted in March, according to Iran's semi-official Nour News.

On 10 March 2023, both Iran and Saudi Arabia announced the restoration of relations after a deal brokered by China. The Iranian embassy reopened on 6 June while the Saudi embassy in Iran reopened in 9 August.

=== Somalia ===
In 2006, the Islamic Courts Union took over Mogadishu from CIA-backed ARPCT. Iran has been one of several nations backing the public uprising. According to Prime Minister Ali Mohammed Ghedi, Iran, Egypt, and Libya are helping the militia. The Somali prime minister accuses these countries of wanting more conflict in Somalia, which seems contradictory because of the transitional government's inability to extend authority beyond Baidoa, which is something the Islamic Republic sees.

=== Sudan ===
In 1991, "there was evidence of increasing economic and military links between Sudan and Iran... Some 2,000 Iranian Revolutionary Guards were allegedly dispatched to Sudan to assist with the training of the Sudanese army, and in December President Rafsanjani of Iran made an official visit to Sudan, during which a trade agreement between the two countries was concluded. In November 1993, Iran was reported to have financed Sudan's purchase of some 20 Chinese ground-attack aircraft. In April 1996, the Government was reported to be granting the Iranian navy the use of marine facilities in exchange for financial assistance for the purchase of arms although, in response to a Sudanese request for military aid in 1997, Iran provided assistance only with military maintenance."

During the last week of April 2006, Sudanese President Omar Hasan Ahmad al-Bashir met with a number of Iranian public figures in Tehran, including the Supreme Leader Ali Khamenei and President Mahmoud Ahmadinejad. In a joint news conference with al-Bashir on 24 April, Ahmadinejad explained to the public his belief that "expansion of ties between the two countries serves the interests of both nations, the region, and the Islamic world, particularly in terms of boosting peace and stability." Before the conference ended, al-Bashir congratulated Iran for its successful pursuit of "nuclear power for peaceful purposes," while Ahmadinejad restated his opposition to the participation of UN Peacekeepers in Darfur.

=== Syria ===
Ba'athist Syria and Iran were strategic allies. Syria was often called Iran's "closest ally", the Arab nationalism ideology of Syria's Baath party notwithstanding. During the Iran–Iraq War, Syria sided with non-Arab Iran against its enemy Iraq and was isolated by Saudi Arabia and some of the Arab countries, with the exceptions of Libya, Lebanon, Algeria, Sudan and Oman. Iran and Syria have had a strategic alliance ever since, partially due to their common animosity towards Saddam Hussein and coordination against the United States and Israel, until 2024. Syria and Iran cooperated on arms smuggling from Iran to Hezbollah in Lebanon, which borders Israel.

On 16 June 2006, the defence ministers of Iran and Syria signed an agreement for military cooperation against what they called the "common threats" presented by Israel and the United States. Details of the agreement were not specified, however Iranian defense minister Najjar said "Iran considers Syria's security its own security, and we consider our defense capabilities to be those of Syria." The visit also resulted in the sale of Iranian military hardware to Syria. In addition to receiving military hardware, Iran has consistently invested billions of dollars into the Syrian economy. The Ba'athist Syrian leadership, including Former President Assad himself, belongs predominantly to the Alawite branch of Shi'a Islam. Iran was involved in implementing several industrial projects in Syria, including cement factories, car assembly lines, power plants, and silo construction. Iran also had plans to set up a joint Iranian–Syrian bank in the future.

In February 2007, Presidents Mahmoud Ahmadinejad and Bashar al-Assad met in Tehran. Ahmadinejad afterwards declared that they would form an alliance to combat US and Israeli conspiracies against the Islamic world.

During the Syrian Civil War, Iran has aided the Syrian government. The Guardian has claimed that in 2011 the Iranian Revolutionary Guard increased its "level of technical support and personnel support" to strengthen Syria's "ability to deal with protesters," according to one diplomat in Damascus.

Iran reportedly assisted the Syrian government sending it riot control equipment, intelligence monitoring techniques and oil. It also agreed to fund a large military base at Latakia airport. The Daily Telegraph has claimed in 2011 that a former member of Syria's secret police reported "Iranian snipers" had been deployed in Syria to assist in the crackdown on protests. According to the US government, Mohsen Chizari, the Quds Force's third-in-command, has visited Syria to train security services to fight against the protestors. Supreme Leader Ali Khamenei, stated in regards to the uprising: "In Syria, the hand of America and Israel is evident;" and in regards to the al-Assad government: "Wherever a movement is Islamic, populist, and anti-American, we support it."

Other Iranian officials have made similar pronouncements identifying the US government as the origin of the uprising. However, in late August, the Iranian government gave its "first public sign" of concern over Syrian's handling of its crisis when foreign minister Ali Akbar Salehi issued a statement including the Syrian government in the list of states he urged to "answer to the demands of its people."

After the fall of the Assad government it is uncertain how relations will develop as an Iranian diplomat said in December 2024.

=== Tunisia ===
Following labour unrest led by the Tunisian General Labour Union throughout the 1970s and early 1980s, in 1987 President Bourguiba instigated a massive purge of Tunisian politics under the pretext of a "terrorist conspiracy" sponsored by Iran. Iran protested and diplomatic relations were promptly broken. On 27 September 1987, a state security court found 76 defendants guilty of plotting against the government and planting bombs; seven (five in absentia) were sentenced to death.

In September 1990, Tunisia and Iran restored diplomatic relations once again. Relations remained unchanged until June 1999, when the speaker of the Tunisian Parliament, Fouad Mebazaa, became the first Tunisian official to visit Iran since the beginning of the Islamic Revolution in 1979. His visit was intended to reflect "the rapid improvement in bilateral relations since the setting up of the joint committee for cooperation on the level of the foreign ministers in the mid-1990s". By 2000, trade relations between the two nations reached USD 73 million. The following year, on 19 April 2001, Tunisian prime minister Muhammad al-Ghanoushe visited Tehran on "an official visit" to sign a new joint trade agreement with his counterpart.

=== United Arab Emirates ===
Iranian investors have a wide presence in the UAE and account for 10 percent of the Arab country's population. Based on recent statistics, nearly 400,000 Iranians live in the UAE running 10,000 small business firms. Trade between Dubai and Iran tripled to $12 billion from 2005 to 2009.

Following the 1979 Revolution in Iran, the UAE has been pushing for the return of the islands. The countries maintain very close economic ties and the UAE has a significant Iranian expatriate community. Outstanding conflicts are:

- UAE claims two islands in the Persian Gulf currently held by Iran: Lesser Tunb (called Tunb al Sughra in Arabic by UAE and Tonb-e Kuchak in Persian by Iran) and Greater Tunb (called Tunb al Kubra in Arabic by UAE and Tonb-e Bozorg in Persian by Iran);
- UAE claims island in the Persian Gulf jointly administered with Iran (called Abu Musa in Arabic by UAE and Jazireh-ye Abu Musa in Persian by Iran) – over which Iran has taken steps to exert unilateral control since 1992, including access restrictions and a military build-up on the island.

However, Iran has criticized the UAE for allowing France to develop its first permanent base in the Persian Gulf region there.

Recently, despite the spread of false information by neighboring countries and outsider powers, UAE has been seeking to ease tensions with Iran, as they are two of the most strategic partners in terms of economy and politics.

=== Yemen ===
Yemen and Iran have full diplomatic and trade relations. Following the first two decades of the 1979 Revolution, ties between Tehran and Sana'a were never strong, but in recent years the two countries have attempted to settle their differences. One sign of this came on 2003-12-02, when the Yemeni foreign ministry announced that "Yemen welcomes Iran's request to participate in the Arab League as an observer member."

On 10 May 2006, "the Yemeni ambassador to Iran Jamal al-Salal met... with the Iranian deputy foreign minister for the Arab and North Africa Affairs Mohammad Baqiri and the deputy assistant of the foreign minister for educational affairs and research Mohammadi respectively. The meeting centered on boosting mutual cooperation between the two countries and means to reinforce them. The talks also dealt with issues of common interest at the regional and Islamic levels."

== Analysis ==
In October 2026, Badr bin Hamad Al Busaidi, Oman's foreign minister, asked for a non-aggression and security treaty between Iran and the Gulf states, arguing that a 50-year US insistence that the countries should see Iran as a security threat had weakened their ability to resolve their issues. According to Patrick Wintour, diplomatic editor of The Guardian, the idea of forming such a treaty would be unlikely, given the economic damage inflicted by Iran on the economies of Gulf states that host American bases.

== See also ==
- Foreign relations of the Arab League
- Foreign relations of Iran
- Persian Gulf naming dispute
  - Territorial disputes in the Persian Gulf
- Iran–Saudi Arabia proxy conflict
  - Anti-Iranian sentiment in the Arab world
  - Anti-Arab sentiment in Iran
- Iran–Israel proxy conflict
  - Arab–Israeli alliance

== Sources ==
- Kuwait Encyclopædia Britannica. 2006. Encyclopædia Britannica Premium Service. 18 April 2006. http://www.britannica.com/eb/article-93658.
- Oman: A Unique Foreign Policy Produces a Key Player in Middle Eastern and Global Diplomacy RAND. https://www.rand.org/pubs/research_briefs/RB2501/index1.html
- Henner Furtig and Anoushiravan Ehteshami. Iran's Rivalry With Saudi Arabia Between the Gulf Wars. 2006, Ithaca. ISBN 978-0-86372-311-7
