= Foreign policy of the Hugo Chávez administration =

Venezuela's foreign policy during Chávez administration

The foreign policy of the Hugo Chávez administration concerns the policy initiatives made by Venezuela under its former President, Hugo Chávez, towards other states. Chávez's foreign policy may be roughly divided into that concerned with United States-Venezuela relations and that concerned with Venezuela's relations with other states, particularly those in Latin America and developing countries on other continents. In many respects the policies of the Chávez government were substantially different from the previous administrations that governed Venezuela.

== Policy ==
=== Latin American integration ===
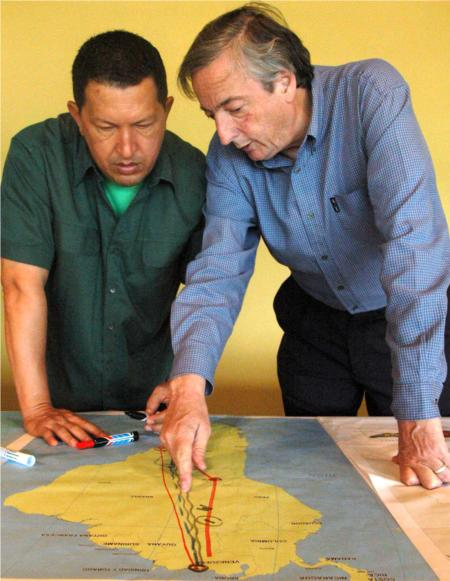
Chávez and former Argentina President Néstor Kirchner discuss energy and trade integration projects for South America. They met on 21 November 2005 in Venezuela.

Hugo Chávez refocused Venezuelan foreign policy on Latin American economic and social integration by enacting bilateral trade and reciprocal aid agreements, including through "oil diplomacy". Chávez stated that Venezuela has "a strong oil card to play on the geopolitical stage ... It is a card that we are going to play with toughness against the toughest country in the world, the United States."

Venezuela worked closely with its neighbors following the 1997 Summit of the Americas in many areas—particularly energy integration—and championed the OAS decision to adopt the Inter-American Convention Against Corruption, also being among the first to ratify it (in 1997). It became a full member of the Mercosur trade bloc on 31 July 2012, expanding its involvement in the hemisphere's trade integration prospects. Bilateral trade relationships with other Latin American countries have also played a major role in his policy, with Chávez increasing arms purchases from Brazil, forming oil-for-expertise trade arrangements with Cuba, and initiating barter arrangements that, among other things, exchange Venezuelan petroleum for cash-strapped Argentina's meat and dairy products. Chavez's re-election in December 2006 was seen as a boost to Cuba. According to Stuart Davis, his foreign policy sought to promote South-South cooperation.

Chávez sought to develop Latin American relationships through arrangements in which Venezuela could provide oil or financial capital on terms favorable to countries which had also experienced colonialism and neocolonialism. For those Latin American leaders who shared his Bolivarian socialist revolutionary vision of change, Evo Morales of Bolivia, Daniel Ortega of Nicaragua, and the Castros of Cuba, Chávez was a visionary who was able to provide cheap or free oil under the PetroCaribe program.

Chávez viewed Cuba as a key international partner due to its internationalist history including its military interventions in southern Africa, and its medical internationalism including the aid it had provided to Venezuela following the Vargas landslides. In Chávez's view, partnership with Cuba would help raise the profile of Chávez's anti-imperialist political project. In October 2000, Venezuela and Cuba formalized this relationship and started to integrate their respective economies through a Comprehensive Cooperation Agreement.

Partnership with Cuba led to the development of the Bolivarian Alternative for the Peoples of Our Americas (ALBA), a regional free trade organization. Venezuelan research center CIECA estimated in September 2008 that Venezuela had given 33 billion dollars to members of the ALBA group since its inception. In ALBA, Venezuela supplied oil on the basis of the Caracas Energy Accord. This treaty implemented Chávez's anti-market strategy: Venezuela supplied oil to 11 Caribbean and Central American countries on a long-term, low-interest basis. The Caracas Accord in turn led to the establishment of the PetroCaribe trade organization in 2005.

Venezuela chaired the Group of 77 in 2002.

=== 2005 UN World Summit ===
Chávez summarily denounced the global status quo as a mortal threat to humanity, demanding that a new approach be taken towards satisfying the UN Millennium Development Goals. He also stated that both global warming and imminent hydrocarbon depletion were also fundamentally threatening mankind's wellbeing. His speech concluded to loud applause and raucous cheering from attending delegates. On the same trip, he also visited the Bronx in New York City, and during a speech delivered at a Bronx church on 17 September stated that, notwithstanding any grievances he may have with the Bush administration's foreign policy, he had "fallen in love with the soul of the people of the United States". Later, in October 2005 on his weekly program Aló Presidente, Chávez stated that recent catastrophes, including hurricanes, droughts, floods, and famines, occurring around the globe were Mother Nature's answer to the "world global capitalist model".

=== OPEC ===
From the outset of his presidency, Chávez took an active role in the Organization of the Petroleum Exporting Countries (OPEC), seeking to increase oil prices internationally.

== UN Security Council ==
In August 2006, Venezuela was actively seeking the candidacy of non-permanent UN Security Council seat. In the final contest between Guatemala and Venezuela, Guatemala's candidacy was backed by the United States while Venezuela was courting Africa, the Arab League and Russia. When submitting Venezuela's candidacy to the Arab League members, El Universal reports that a Foreign Ministry spokesperson said Venezuela "will support our Arab fellows against war and incursion of foreign countries". In the end, the compromise candidate was Panama.

== World Tours ==
=== 2010 ===
Chavez was scheduled to tour seven states: Russia, Iran, Libya, Syria, Ukraine, Portugal and Belarus. On the tour, he was said to sign a raft of deals including nuclear energy, military supplies such as tanks, and other agricultural deals. In Russia, he would sign an agreement to develop nuclear energy, the purchase of Russian tanks and a bi-national bank. Ukraine and Belarus are both recipients of Venezuelan oil.

== Relations with Latin American and Caribbean states ==
=== Antigua and Barbuda ===
Antigua and Barbuda enjoys close relations with Venezuela. As of June 2009 it became a formal member of the Bolivarian Alliance for the Americas (ALBA) international cooperation organization and the Caribbean oil alliance Petrocaribe. In 2009 Antigua and Barbuda received US$50 million from Venezuela because of the country's membership of these initiatives. After the American billionaire fraudster Allen Stanford became embroiled in scandal, Hugo Chávez sent urgent financial assistance to Antigua and Barbuda, which was heavily dependent on Stanford's investment when his business empire collapsed.

"We have benefited from these relationships and so we will continue to forge these alliances, whether it is with Venezuela, Cuba or whoever else that we feel is in the interest of Antigua and Barbuda and the sub-region", said the Prime Minister of Antigua and Barbuda Baldwin Spencer.

=== Argentina ===
In August 2007 a Venezuelan businessman was stopped in Buenos Aires when allegedly trying to smuggle money for the campaign of then first lady and presidential candidate Cristina Fernández de Kirchner on behalf of the Chávez government.

=== Chile ===
After the death of Hugo Chávez it was known that on 4 May 2010, during a Unasur summit in Buenos Aires, Chile's right-wing President Sebastián Piñera had agreed with him a verbal previously unreleased personal non-aggression pact.

=== Colombia ===
Colombia and Venezuela share a long and heavily populated border. They are strong commercial partners and have a considerable shared history, reaching back to the colonization of the New Kingdom of Granada and the formation of Gran Colombia after Simón Bolívar's liberation campaign. Colombia, which receives millions of dollars for anti-narcotics purposes from the United States as part of Plan Colombia, is governed by a popular rightwing administration.

One of the first impasses occurred in late 2004 after the arrest by Venezuelan officials of Rodrigo Granda, a high-ranking representative of the FARC. Granda was then extradited to Colombia in the border city of Cúcuta in what was known as the Rodrigo Granda affair. At the time, Colombian President Álvaro Uribe condemned what he called Chávez's lack of cooperation in implementing law enforcement actions against the FARC. Chávez responded by temporarily cutting diplomatic and trade ties with Colombia. The issue was put to rest in a summit of the two presidents in February 2005.

Chavez also played an important role in mediating with FARC for the release of hostages. He had tried to get FARC's most high-profile hostage Íngrid Betancourt released, only to come out blaming the Colombians for the lack of momentum in talks. This occurred after Chavez, contrary to an agreement with Uribe, called and spoke directly to the Colombian Army chief of staff General Mario Montoya. The agreement called for direct talks with just the heads of state. However, some prisoners, including Clara Rojas Betancourt's top aide who was kidnapped with her, were then released in highly publicized operations.

Later, the Andean crisis led to military moves by Venezuela in conjunction with Ecuador after a raid by Colombia on a FARC bases on Ecuadorian-side of the border. After the raid the Colombian army released several documents recovered from a number of laptops seized during the raid, allegedly supporting the existence of links between FARC and Hugo Chávez. Leonel Fernández, the president of the Dominican Republic, then took the initiative to mend relations.

In September 2009, an agreement between Colombia and the U.S. created new tensions between the two countries. The agreement granted the US military supervised access to Colombian air bases for drug interdiction, but was interpreted by Chavez as threat to his country, and has been used as justification for the purchase of nearly 2 billion dollars in weapons from Russia.

The 2010 Colombia–Venezuela diplomatic crisis saw a diplomatic stand-off between Colombia and Venezuela over allegations in July 2010 by outgoing President Álvaro Uribe that the Venezuelan government was actively permitting the Colombian FARC and ELN guerillas to seek safe haven in its territory. Uribe presented evidence to the Organization of American States (OAS) allegedly drawn from laptops acquired in Colombia's 2008 raid on a FARC camp in Ecuador, a raid which had sparked the 2008 Andean diplomatic crisis. In response to the allegations Venezuela broke off diplomatic relations, and there was speculation of a possible war. The crisis was resolved after Juan Manuel Santos was inaugurated as the new President of Colombia on 7 August 2010, with the intervention of UNASUR bringing together Santos and Venezuelan President Hugo Chávez. Chávez told the guerillas that there could be no military solution to the internal Colombia conflict, and Santos agreed to turn over the disputed laptops to the Ecuadorean government. Colombia and Venezuela agreed to re-establish diplomatic relations.

=== Brazil ===
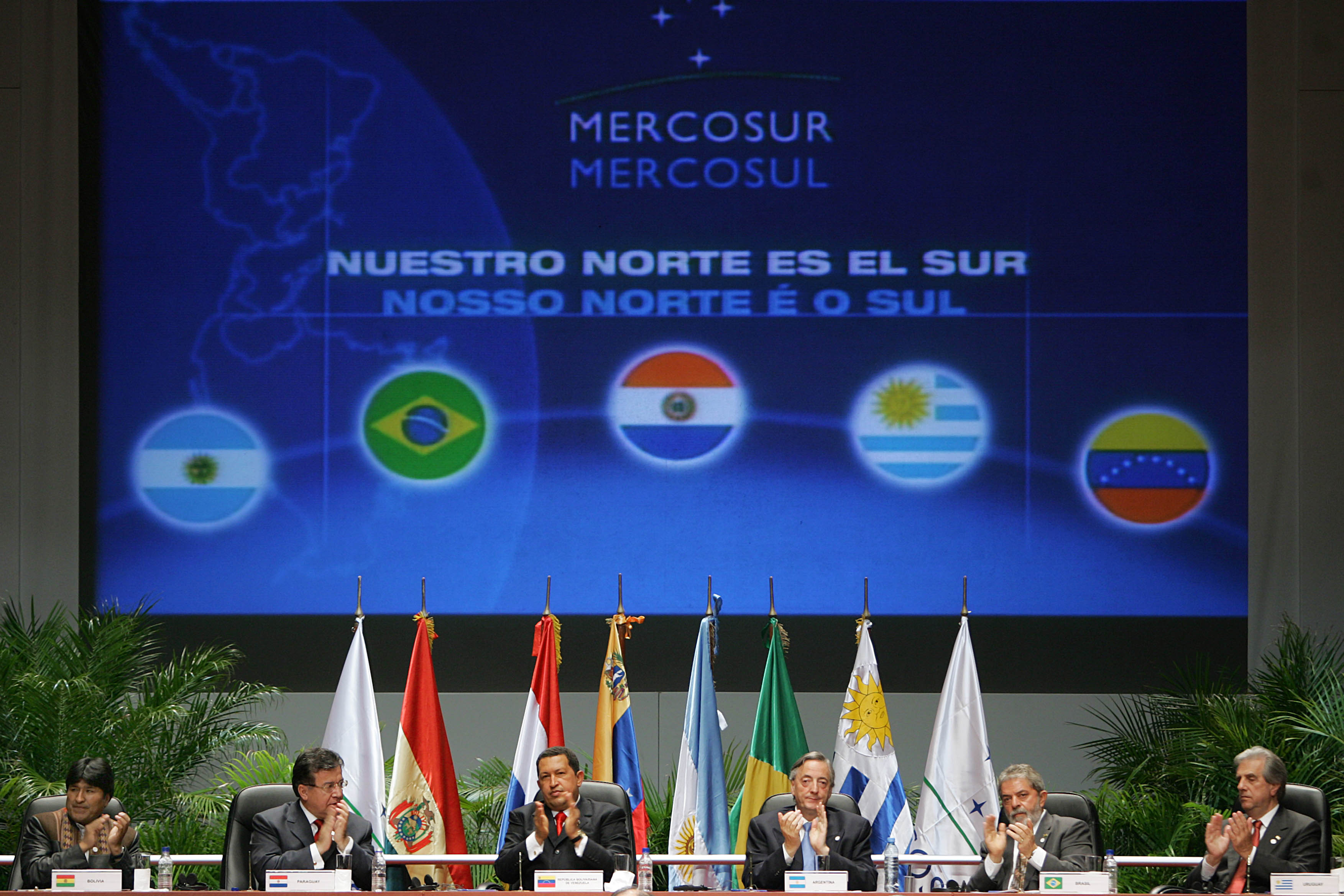
Mercosur summit in 2005

Venezuela and Brazil have been working together on large-scale regional projects. Both Venezuela and Brazil were seen to be leading an initiative to form the Bank of the South (BancoSur), an institution that would pool a portion of participating countries' reserves, and ultimately seeking to replace the International Monetary Fund, as well as its onerous insistence on cutting social and infrastructure programs as conditions for its loans, in return for a more development-friendly approach. Other regional states have also signaled an interest in the project, these include: Bolivia, Ecuador, Colombia, Paraguay, and Uruguay.

In November 2008 when Venezuela imposed a $282 million tax bill on Brazilian construction giant Odebrecht. Odebrecht responded that it had already paid its full tax bill for the year and did not need to pay the new bill. Venezuela's Seniat tax authority gave Odebrecht 15 days to appeal.

=== Peru ===
In 2001, newly elected Peruvian President Alejandro Toledo's suspicion that the Chávez administration was protecting and hiding Vladimiro Montesinos provoked a major diplomatic confrontation between the two countries. The crisis started when Peru's Interior Minister Antonio Ketin Vidal blamed Venezuelan intelligence officers of disrupting a secret joint operation by Peruvian and US agents to capture former Peruvian intelligence chief Montesinos. The right-wing Venezuelan press reported the presence of Montesinos in Venezuelan territory months before the capture, although José Vicente Rangel, representing the position of the Venezuelan government, denied his presence and the rumors that suggested that Montesinos was inside Venezuela. An April 2001 article by the journalist Patricia Poleo (for which she was awarded 2001's "King of Spain Journalism Award") described firsthand accounts of Montesinos' presence in Venezuela. Venezuelan security forces captured Montesinos in June of that year and later deported him to Peru to face charges of corruption, bribery and human rights violations. Further diplomatic disputes ensued as Venezuelan security forces claimed most of the credit for finding Montesinos while Peru claimed its own forces and US FBI agents deserved credit. Chávez withdrew his envoy to Peru in response to this affair, in part because he accused Peru of having undertaken security operations in Venezuela without previous approval. Gustavo Gorriti, advisor to President Toledo, said that President Chávez had no other option but to order the arrest of Montesinos following the pressure of a lead provided by the FBI after the capture of a former Venezuelan army officer who was withdrawing money from a bank in Miami, allegedly for Montesinos. When Chávez attended Toledo's presidential inauguration, he was called a "dictator" by members of the Peruvian congress.

Between January and March 2006, Chávez commented on the candidates of the 2006 Peruvian Presidential election, openly backing Ollanta Humala (Union for Peru, nationalist-left) while referring to Alan García (APRA) as a "thief" and a "crook" and considering Lourdes Flores a "candidate of the oligarchy". His support in fact backfired when Alan García used it to attack Ollanta Humala; García won the election. The Peruvian government admonished Chávez for interfering in Peru's affairs. Chávez's comments led the Peruvian government to state that he was interfering in Peru's affairs in breach of international law. Both countries recalled their ambassadors. Garcia and Chávez reconciled their differences, ending the feud, and relations between Peru and Venezuela were restored. In 2007, normal diplomatic relations were restored, until April 2009 when Peru granted political asylum to Manuel Rosales, an opponent of Chávez and under charges of corruption. This in turn led Venezuela to again recall its diplomat from Peru. The dispute is ongoing.

Peruvian authorities are currently investigating money transfers totaling $200.000 made from Venezuelan companies to the wife of Peruvian presidential candidate Ollanta Humala

=== Mexico ===
On 10 November 2005, Chávez referenced Mexican President Vicente Fox during a speech to supporters in Caracas, saying "the president of a people like the Mexicans lets himself become the puppy dog of the empire" for what he alleged was Fox's support of U.S. trade interests in his promotion of the newly stalled FTAA. Additionally, on 13 November 2005 episode of his weekly talk show, Aló Presidente, Chávez stated that the Mexican president was "bleeding from his wounds" and warned Fox not to "mess" with him, lest he "get stung." Fox, upon hearing the remarks, expressed his outrage and threatened to recall the Mexican ambassador to Venezuela if the Chavez did not promptly issue an apology. However, Chávez simply recalled Venezuela's own ambassador to Mexico City, Vladimir Villegas. The Mexican ambassador to Caracas was recalled the following day. Although ties between the two countries have been strained, neither country will say that diplomatic ties have been indefinitely severed. Several groups in both Mexico and Venezuela are working to restore the diplomatic relationship between the two countries. In August 2007, each country reinstated her ambassador to the other, restoring full diplomatic relations.

Chávez got into a dispute with Mexican President Vicente Fox over what Chávez alleged was Fox's support of US trade interests. The dispute resulted in a strained diplomatic relationship between the two countries.

=== Ecuador ===
As another leftist leader in Latin America, Rafael Correa, also had close ties with Venezuela and Chavez. The strongest show of support for the Ecuadorian leader was during the Andean crisis. At a time of escalating tensions with Colombia and Uribe's government due to an incursion on Ecudorean sovereignty, Chavez came out strongly in support of the former as he increased tensions on Colombia's other border with Venezuela to deflect the pressure on Ecuador, while supporting them every step of the way.

=== Bolivia ===
The strongest support for a Latin America was reserved for Evo Morales. In 2005 Morales, was said to be receiving funds from Chávez as Bolivia faced a series of strikes and blockades that threatened its stability.

In 2006, Morales said he was uniting with Venezuela in a fight against "neoliberalism and imperialism". He agreed to work with Venezuela in sharing information and resources in agriculture, healthcare, education and energy.

During the 2008 unrest in Bolivia, Chavez came out strongly in support of Morales by accusing the US of being behind the agitation in the provinces opposing Morales, where there are also secessionist demands. After Morales declared the U.S. ambassador, Philip Goldberg, persona non-grata for supporting the provinces and instigating violence, and the U.S. reciprocated. Chavez in turn ejected the U.S. ambassador in Caracas as well, and recalled the Venezuelan ambassador from Washington, D.C.. In doing so, Chavez said: "They're trying to do here what they were doing in Bolivia. That's enough ... from you, Yankees." He added that Venezuela's ambassador to Washington, Bernardo Alvarez, would return to the U.S. "when there's a new government in the United States."

Venezuela donated close to U$80 million that Evo Morales distributed as part of his "Bolivia cambia, Evo cumple" program

=== Paraguay ===
As Paraguay's new leftist President Fernando Lugo was inaugurated, a change from 61 unbroken years of Colorado party rule, Chavez and Correa were together in the country to support another regional left leader. Chavez tried to woo the president with promises to fill Paraguay's imported oil gap. President Lugo has supported Venezuela's entry into Mercosur; however, the Colorado Party's influence in Paraguay's Congress and Senate retards this expansion.

Stratfor also theorized that Chavez was trying to pry Lugo away from Brazil as the two were working on the Itaipu energy partnership. Doing this, they said, would weaken the other South American giant's, Brazil, efforts to extend its influence throughout Latin America. Paraguay and Venezuela restarted negotiations on an unpaid debt of $250 million owed by Paraguayan oil company Petropar to its counterpart Petróleos de Venezuela after the Presidents of Paraguay and Venezuela met to deal with the financing.

In September 2009 Paraguay's President Fernando Lugo revoked plans for US troops to hold joint military exercises and development projects. President Lugo referenced strong regional opposition from countries such as Venezuela, Argentina, Brazil, Bolivia and Ecuador to the expansion of US military bases in Colombia in his decision. President Hugo Chávez is an outspoken critic of US "imperialism", military activity and expansion in Latin America.

=== Uruguay ===
In August 2009 it was alleged that the Venezuelan government was purchasing thousands of books from a company belonging to the wife of the Uruguayan presidential candidate José Mujica, for nearly 100 times the actual price of the books

=== Nicaragua ===
Hugo Chávez publicly supported Nicaraguan candidate Daniel Ortega and the left wing FSLN party in Nicaragua., and offered oil at preferential prices to town mayors belonging to the Sandinista Party.

=== Panama ===
In 2004, Hugo Chávez's government (along with Cuba) suspended diplomatic relations with Panama and recalled its ambassador, after the Panamanian government refused to extradite a Cuban exile militant and CIA agent Luis Posada Carriles, claiming his life was in danger if extradited to those countries.

== Relations with the U.S. ==
The historically friendly diplomatic relationship between the Venezuela and the United States deteriorated steadily following the election of Hugo Chavez in Venezuela in 1999. When George W. Bush became President of the United States in 2001, relations between the United States and Venezuela grew even more tense. Relations between the two countries have further been degraded after Chavez accused the United States of being behind the 2002 military coup that briefly ousted him from power and hit an all-time low following the 2003 invasion of Iraq. While in office, President Chávez was highly critical of US economic and foreign policy and often referred to the United States derogatorily as "The Empire". He has referred to President George W. Bush as a devil, a drunk, a war criminal among others and has referred to President Obama as a "clown" and "shares the same stench as Bush" The relationship reached a diplomatic low point when Venezuela temporarily froze diplomatic relations with the US for several months after Hugo Chávez expelled the US ambassador to Venezuela in 2008 –09.

== Relations with European nations ==
=== Spain ===
Early during his first term, Chavez visited Spain, which he ostensibly regarded as "the gateway of Venezuela into Europe." Spain was at the time anxious for the safety of the many investments Spanish banks and energy companies held in the country, which Chavez sought to reassure, and the Spanish government attempted to broker some understanding between Venezuela and the Colombian president Andres Pastrana. Relations with the Spanish conservative government of José María Aznar soon soured however, particularly as the prospect of Spanish economic interests in the country deteriorated during the early 2000s, and soon became extremely delicate, as Spain was the second country to recognise the government of Pedro Carmona, emerged from the 2002 coup d'état (the US had been the first). Criticism of Aznar emerged within Spain, from the Izquierda Unida party, whose spokesman Gaspar Llamazares claimed that "the fact that Aznar 'picked up the phone' to Carmona demonstrates his support for the coup". The Chávez government also suggested an alleged support of the Spanish ambassador Manuel Viturro to the government that emerged from the 2002 Venezuelan coup d'état attempt.

Chavez did try to relaunch his relationship with Spain, which he officially visited in 2004 for the first time. Subsequently, with the 2007 change of government in Spain, relations improved ostensibly when the social-democratic Prime Minister José Luis Rodríguez Zapatero took over, and bilateral agreements were signed for the sale of Spanish ships and military equipment to Venezuela. However, on 10 November 2007, during the closing ceremony of the 17th Ibero-American Summit in Chile, a serious incident occurred when Chávez accused the former Spanish Prime Minister, José María Aznar, of having supported the 2002 coup attempt, calling him a "fascist" and a "racist" among other things. Zapatero, the then Spanish Prime Minister, used his time to demand that Chávez "respect" Aznar "because, beyond ideological differences, he is a democratic leader elected by the Spanish people", being repeatedly interrupted at a closed microphone by Chávez, who asked the Spanish Prime Minister to say the same to Aznar. At that point, the King of Spain, who was seated next to Rodríguez Zapatero, shouted at Chávez "Why don't you shut up?".

This diplomatic incident increased the tension between Spain and the Venezuelan government. In the days that followed, the Spanish government tried to defuse the tension and play down the clash, while Chávez was increasing tensions through repeated statements about the incident, affirming, on 14 November, that "Spanish companies are going to have to start being more accountable and that I am going to keep an eye on them to see what they are doing here, on all the Spanish companies that are in Venezuela", which was seen as a threat to Spanish business interests in Venezuela.

=== Russia ===
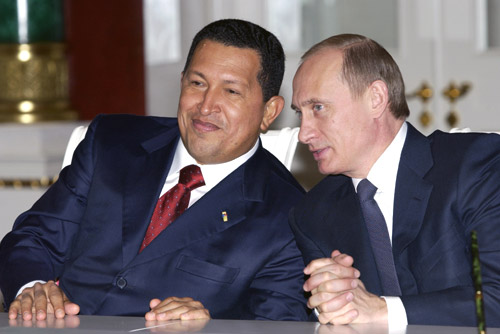
Vladimir Putin and Hugo Chávez in Moscow, November 2004

Russian-Venezuelan relations were tightened during the reign of Chavez with energy and military cooperation. The latter led to joint exercises between the two militaries and a visit by a Russian naval ship to Venezuela. Furthermore, Venezuela also acquired billions of dollars of arms from Russia . Following Chavez's two visits to Moscow in July and September 2008, Russian Deputy Prime Minister Igor Sechin arrived in Venezuela to pave the way for a third meeting within five months between their two presidents. In November 2008, Venezuela and Russia discussed 46 potential cooperation agreements during an Intergovernmental Commission. Venezuelan Vice President Ramón Carrizales and Sechin reviewed a series of initiatives that Chavez and Russian President Dimitri Medvedev would sign later in the month. Venezuelan Foreign Minister Nicolas Maduro added to aggressive foreign policy initiatives sought by Chavez in saying that "the unipolar world is collapsing and finishing in all aspects, and the alliance with Russia is part of that effort to build a multipolar world." The two countries discussed the creation of a bi-national investment bank, the opening of a direct air route between Caracas and Moscow, the building of an aluminum plant, the construction of a gas platform off the Venezuelan coast, plans for automobile production, and Venezuela's acquisition of Russian planes and ships. While the two countries also reached agreements on the development of outer space and the use of nuclear energy. Maduro added that the two countries "will develop all what has to do with technology and satellite in the space", while still continuing to work at using nuclear energy with peaceful means to generate alternative energy.

Venezuela sought to develop mines at its largest gold deposits with help from Russia. Venezuelan Mining Minister, Rodolfo Sanz, told a Russian delegation that a memorandum of understanding would be signed with the Russian-owned Rusoro to operate the Las Cristinas and Brisas mine projects with the Venezuelan government. The former, one of Latin America's largest gold projects, was under contract to Canada's Crystallex, which had waited in vain for years for an environmental license to start mining. The minister, however, said the government was taking control of the mine to start work in 2009. Further ties were in the offing when Chavez said an agreement for the Humberto Fernandez Moran Nuclear Facility would be signed upon Russian President Medvedev's visit to Venezuela accompanied by a Russian fleet of warships in mid to late-November 2008. Chavez also revealed that Russian nuclear technicians were already at work in Venezuela. As a Russian flotilla, including the nuclear-powered warship Peter the Great, was on its way to the Caribbean for naval exercises with Venezuela, analysts saw the move as a geopolitical response to US support for Georgia following the Russo-Georgian War. In September 2009, Venezuela became one of three nations worldwide to recognize South Ossetia and Abkhazia as countries independent of Georgia. Russia is one of the other two. Russian fighter jets have also been sold to Venezuela, while Caracas bought 100,000 Kalashnikov assault rifles for its military. However, the Russian Deputy Foreign Minister, Sergei Ryabkov downplayed the relevance of such moves "It looks like everyone has been accustomed for a long time to our warships being in naval bases and our warplanes in hangars, and thinking it will be like that forever", Ryabkov stated.

On 27 July 2006, Hugo Chávez and Russian president Vladimir Putin announced an agreement in Moscow which enabled the import of military equipment from Russia to Venezuela. In October 2010, Chavez visited Russia where he signed a deal to build Venezuela's first nuclear power plant.

=== Serbia ===
On 21 February 2008 Hugo Chávez said that Venezuela will not recognize an independent Kosovo, warning that the southeastern European nation's separation from Serbia could spark war in the Balkans and that it could end in a disaster. He said "This cannot be accepted. It's a very dangerous precedent for the entire world.". He compared the situation with separatists in Zulia State and Santa Cruz Department in Bolivia. He called Kosovo a region of Serbia which is recognized by history and geography. He attributed the decision of the Kosovars to an imperialist plan to continue weakening countries in the world. Chávez stated that Venezuela supports the position of Russia, that it has the same position as the People's Republic of China and many other countries and he also expressed satisfaction with the position of the government of Spain. He stated he cannot understand how there are countries that accepted Kosovo's move.

He accused Washington on 24 March 2008 of trying to "weaken Russia" by supporting independence for Kosovo despite opposition by Serbia and Russia. He called Kosovo's new leader, Prime Minister Hashim Thaçi, a "terrorist" put in power by the US, and noted that the former rebel leader's nom de guerre was "The Snake." Chavez had strongly opposed the NATO intervention in Kosovo in 1999 when he first became president.

=== Netherlands ===
In August 2007, Chávez came in conflict with the Netherlands concerning the Netherlands Antilles. Chávez gave a number of public speeches in which he said that the region ought to be 'freed from colonialism' and claimed that every piece of land within 200 nautical miles (370 km) of the Venezuelan coast belongs to Venezuela. Since the Dutch Antilles are positioned 40 miles (64 km) off Venezuela, this was interpreted by some Dutch officials as a threat of invasion of Dutch sovereignty, and several political parties requested that the Dutch army be prepared for war, a VVD official referring to the Antilles as "the Dutch Falklands" while other parties dismissed Chávez' speeches as populism with no real intention of invading the Dutch Antilles. According to Radio Netherlands Worldwide, Chávez was not referring to the Netherlands Antilles or Aruba but to the Isla Aves, adding that "...there is nothing to worry about as far as the Netherlands Antilles are concerned, but that doesn't fit in with the US's publicity campaign. The media leave out all this kind of information and simply report that Venezuela wants to expand its borders and, in doing so, is intent on swallowing up the Leeward Islands.[...] The Hague knows there is no claim to Aruba or the Netherlands Antilles, and that President Chávez has not made such a claim in any speech".

=== United Kingdom ===
On 8 February 2006, the British Prime Minister Tony Blair answered a question asked by the MP Colin Burgon about the policy of the United Kingdom towards Venezuela, in the British House of Commons. Blair said: "It is rather important that the government of Venezuela realise that if they want to be respected members of the international community they should abide by the rules of the international community". Blair also said: "I also have to say with the greatest respect to the president of Venezuela that when he forms an alliance with Cuba I would prefer to see Cuba a proper functioning democracy".

President Chávez replied the following day that Mr. Blair disobeyed international rules when the UK invaded Iraq and called him "a pawn of imperialism" and "the main ally of Hitler (George Bush)"

At the same time Hugo Chávez criticized Tony Blair for his alliance with the United States and the Iraq War he consolidated a strong partnership with the mayor of London Ken Livingstone. In May 2006, Chávez made a private visit to England where he met with Livingstone, but not with Blair. Defending his decision to host a luncheon in honour of Mr. Chávez, Livingstone declared on BBC Radio 4 that "Chávez had been responsible for significant social reforms and called him 'the best news out of Latin America in many years". When a journalist asked President Chávez why he did not meet with the Prime Minister, Chávez said it is a "very silly question"; "It was a private visit. And, if anyone did not know what that meant, they should look it up in a protocol manual". Livingstone's trip to Venezuela to sign an agreement to provide cheap oil to the poor inhabitants of London in November 2006 was cancelled because of the Venezuelan presidential elections.

In February 2007, the agreement between Chávez and Livingstone about the cheap petroleum to London's less well-off was signed. In return, the Greater London Authority advises Venezuela on recycling, waste management, traffic and reducing carbon emissions. This deal came under criticism from the London Assembly Conservatives. Prices were slashed by 20%; following this, half-price bus travel became available to Londoners on income support. Livingstone commented: "This will make it cheaper and easier for people to go about their lives and get the most out of London. The agreement... will also benefit the people of Venezuela, by providing expertise in areas of city management in which London is a world leader."

=== Vatican ===
Chávez had a series of disputes with both the Venezuelan Catholic clergy and Protestant church hierarchies.

On visiting the Vatican in 2006 Chavez had an extraordinarily long meeting with the Pope. The Pope presented Chávez with a letter detailing the concerns of the Holy See regarding the condition of the Church in Venezuela. Among the issues most important to the Pope were:

- the freedom of the Holy See to nominate new bishops,
- the preservation of a distinctive Catholic identity at the Church-run University of Santa Rosa in Lima,
- the elimination of religious education from the school curriculum,
- the introduction of public-health programs that undermined the right to life,
- and the need for independence in the Catholic media.

Chavez did offer his assurances that his government would work to ease the tensions that had characterized his relations with the Venezuelan bishops. Among his critics at home was Cardinal Rosalio Castillo Lara, the most outspoken prelate, referring to Chávez as a "paranoid dictator" who had crushed democracy in Venezuela. In the battle of words that followed, the President, in turn, referred to the critical bishops as "devils" and made a charge against the Catholic hierarchy that the latter were plotting against his government.

In a more terse shift Chávez hit out at the Pope during the latter's trip to Brazil, where he said the Roman Catholic Church had purified the American Indians. This was the first direct confrontation with the head of the church, accusing the Pontiff of ignoring the "holocaust" that followed Christopher Columbus's 1492 landing in the Americas. His exact words were, "With all due respect your Holiness, apologize because there was a real genocide here and, if we were to deny it, we would be denying our very selves." Furthermore, Chávez's words came only days after the Venezuelan media interpreted other comments from the Pope as singling out Chávez as a danger to Latin America when he warned of autocrats in the region.

== Relations with Asian and Middle Eastern nations ==
=== China ===
When Hugo Chávez came to power, trade with China had peaked under $200mn but since then it jumped to nearly $10bn. Chinese officials say that Venezuela has now become the biggest recipient of its investments in Latin America. Venezuela also embarked on a programme of cultural and scientific exchange with China.

In 2008 the governments of Venezuela and the People's Republic of China launched their first joint space satellite, named Venesat-1. Venezuela's leader Hugo Chávez said the satellite would be a tool of integration for Latin America and the Caribbean regions by saying "This satellite is not for us but for the people of Latin America and the Caribbean. It is a further step towards independence", he said, adding that the project would break the mold of "technological illiteracy." In September 2008, Chavez visited PR China where he declared himself to be a "Maoist" and touted what he said was Chinese support to counter U.S. domination of world affairs. He also got China to jointly build oil tankers and help Venezuela build a refinery to process heavy crude oil in Venezuela. He similarly hailed China's plans to launch a telecommunications satellite for Venezuela (Venesat-1) on 1 November 2008. While he also established military-technological ties with the acquisition of two squadrons (24) of Chinese-built Karakorum-8 trainer jets and ground radars, signalling a greater Chinese involvement in Latin America.

In 2009, China entered into a partnership with Venezuela to launch a railway company in Venezuela which will be 40% controlled by the China Railways Engineering Corporation (CREC) and the remainder by Venezuela. Venezuela outlined the role of the venture as one which would link Venezuela's oil producing regions and agricultural farming areas

Oil exports to China are set to increase substantially. In September 2008 Venezuela signed a series of energy co-operation deals with China with the President of Venezuela stating that oil exports could rise threefold by 2012, to one million barrels a day. In February 2009 Venezuela and China agreed to double their joint investment fund to $12 billion and signed agreements to boost co-operation which include increasing oil exports from Venezuela, China's fourth biggest oil provider. An oil refinery is planned be built in China to handle Venezuelan heavy crude from the Orinoco basin. "It is part of a strategic alliance" Venezuelan President Hugo Chávez said, after meeting the visiting Chinese Vice President Xi Jinping who stated that "our co-operation is highly beneficial". In September 2009 Venezuela announced a new $16bn deal with China to drill for oil in a joint venture with PDVSA to produce 450,000 barrels a day of extra heavy crude. Hugo Chávez stated that "In addition, there will be a flood of technology into the country, with China going to build drilling platforms, oil rigs, railroads, houses."

=== Iran ===
President Chávez developed strong ties with the government of Iran, in particular in the area of energy production, economic, and industrial cooperation. He visited Iran on several occasions, the first time in 2001, when he declared that he came to Iran to "prepare the road for peace, justice, stability and progress for the 21st century". Mohamed Khatami also visited Venezuela on three occasions. During his 2005 visit, Chávez awarded him the Orden del Libertador and called him a "tireless fighter for all the right causes in the world". In May 2006, Chávez expressed his favorable view of the production of nuclear energy in Iran announced by Mahmoud Ahmadinejad and denied that they had plans to develop atomic weapons. His relationship with Iran and his support of their nuclear program created concern for the US administration.

Chavez paid a two-day visit to Iran, as Iran faced international criticism for its nuclear programme. On Chávez's birthday (28 July), Iranian President Mahmoud Ahmadinejad presented Chavez with Iran's highest honour for "supporting Tehran in its nuclear standoff with the international community."

Chávez pledged that Venezuela would "stay by Iran at any time and under any condition." Ahmedinejad called Chávez a kindred spirit. "I feel I have met a brother and trench mate after meeting Chavez." Chávez said he "admired the Iranian president for 'his wisdom and strength'", saying, "We are with you and with Iran forever. As long as we remain united we will be able to defeat (U.S.) imperialism, but if we are divided they will push us aside."

Reuters reported that Chávez told the crowd at Tehran University, "If the US empire succeeds in consolidating its dominance, then the humankind has no future. Therefore, we have to save the humankind and put an end to the US empire". The reports adds that Chávez strongly criticised Israel and labeled the 2006 Lebanon war offensive as "fascist and terrorist." Decorating Chávez with the "Higher Medal of the Islamic Republic of Iran", Ahmadinejad said, "Mr. Chávez is my brother, he is a friend of the Iranian nation and the people seeking freedom around the world. He works perpetually against the dominant system. He is a worker of God and servant of the people."

At a time when Venezuela and Russia were working on nuclear cooperation, the Iranian Minister of Science, Research and Technology Mohammad-Mehdi Zahedi, headed a delegation to Caracas to hold talks with high-ranking officials in order to follow up on implementation of agreements which had been inked between the two countries in 2006. Additionally, two technical and educational committees for implementing Iran-Venezuela agreements were also set up. The Iranian delegation visited the Venezuelan Foundation for Seismological Research, Caracas Central University, Simón Bolívar University, and the Venezuelan Institute for Scientific Research. As of the end of 2008, Iran's beneficence to Venezuela had paid dividends in the form of an Iranian ammunition factory, a car assembly plant, a cement factory and even direct air service between Tehran, Damascus and Caracas courtesy of Iran Air, amongst others. Beyond the political-military sphere the two countries also pledged to work together academically in the commissioning of a new university programme at the existing, tuition-free Bolivarian University, with a focus on teaching socialist principles and to promote discussion of "21st century socialism." The government of Venezuela said this followed with plans to establish the University of Civilizations under accords recently signed with Iran. During a visit to Iran in 2010, Chavez and Ahmadenijad said they sought to "establish a new world order."

=== Israel ===
Venezuela-Israel relations were traditionally strong. But the relations have soured under the presidency of Hugo Chavez, who has been a fierce critic of Israel. On 3 August 2006 Chávez ordered the Venezuelan chargé d'affaires to Israel to return from Tel Aviv to Venezuela, protesting the 2006 Israel-Lebanon conflict. Israel responded by recalling its Israeli ambassador to Venezuela. Chávez responded with statements comparing Israel to Hitler and describing their actions as a "new Holocaust", and blamed the United States for their involvement.

In an interview with the news agency Al Jazeera in Dubai, Chávez made the first of two controversial statements regarding Israel's treatment of the Palestinians, saying, "They are doing what Hitler did against the Jews."

Two days later, on his Sunday show Aló Presidente, he said Israel had "gone mad and is inflicting on the people of Palestine and Lebanon the same thing they have criticized, and with reason: the Holocaust. But this is a new Holocaust" with the help of the United States, which he described as a terrorist country. He went on to say that the United States refuses "to allow the [U.N.] Security Council to make a decision to halt the genocide Israel is committing against the Palestinian and Lebanese people."

Accusations of antisemitism were leveled against Chavez because of these comments. The US-based Anti-Defamation League wrote a letter to Chávez, asking him to consider how his statements might affect Venezuela, and the southern area director of the ADL played down the parallels between Israel and Nazi Germany highlighted by Chavez, accusing him of "distorting history and torturing the truth, as he has done in this case, it is a dangerous exercise which echoes classic anti-Semitic themes."

The president of the Miami-based right-wing Independent Venezuelan-American Citizens, said "That's what you expect from someone who surrounds himself with the dregs of the world. He seeks out terrorists and dictators. It's predictable that he wouldn't defend a democratic country like Israel." Jewish-Venezuelan community leaders in Caracas told El Nuevo Herald that Chávez's statements created a situation of "fear and discomfort... The president is not the president of a single group but of Venezuelan Jews as well." The Federation of Israeli Associations of Venezuela condemned what they claimed were "attempts to trivialize the Holocaust, the premeditated and systematic extermination of millions of human beings solely because they were Jews ... by comparing it with the current war actions."

However, Israel's critics have hailed Chávez's actions. The vice-chairman of Hezbollah's political council, Mahmoud Komati, called his actions an example for "revolutionaries", and left-wing British MP George Galloway said that Chávez was a "real leader of the Arab people."

In the wake of the 2008–2009 Israel–Gaza conflict, Venezuela has broken all diplomatic ties with the state of Israel; condemning its actions. On 27 April 2009, Venezuelan foreign minister Nicolas Maduro met with Palestinian National Authority foreign affairs minister Riyad al-Maliki in Caracas, where formal diplomatic relations were established between the two.

During a visit by Syrian President Bashar Assad to Venezuela in June 2010, Chavez stated accused Israel is of being "the assassin arm of the United States" and that "one day the genocidal state of Israel will be put into its place."

=== Taiwan ===
Relations with Taiwan, which Venezuela holds no diplomatic relations since 1974, became strained because of the increasing partnership between the government of Hugo Chávez and the People's Republic of China, affecting Taiwanese businesses and citizens. In 2007, the Venezuelan government decided not to renew visas for five members of Taiwanese commercial representation in Caracas.

=== Vietnam ===
Vietnam and Venezuela set up diplomatic ties in 1989. Since 2006 Vietnam has had an embassy in Caracas and Venezuela an embassy in Hanoi. Though bilateral trade was $11.7 million in 2007 relations show "great potential". Over the past ten years, the two countries have witnessed new developments in various fields, including politics, economics, culture and society, particularly in the oil and gas industry.

Venezuelan President Hugo Chávez visited Vietnam in 2006 and since then his government stepped up bilateral relations with the country, which also included receiving the Communist Party General Secretary, Nông Đức Mạnh in 2007. Petróleos de Venezuela and Petrovietnam also announced a number of joint projects following the 2006 visit, including PetroVietnam being given a concession in the Orinoco basin and an agreement to transport Venezuelan oil to Vietnam, where the two would together build an oil refinery that Vietnam lacks. On the 2006 visit Chavez praised Vietnam's revolutionary history as he attacked the United States for its "imperialist crimes" during the Vietnam War. On the 2008 visit Triet returned similar comments as he lauded a group of Venezuelans who captured a US soldier during the Vietnam War in an unsuccessful bid to prevent the execution of a Vietnamese revolutionary. The two leaders also signed a deal for a $200 million joint fund and 15 cooperation projects.

Vietnamese President Nguyễn Minh Triết arrived in Caracas on 18 November 2008 for a two-day official visit on an invitation from Chávez. Triết hailed Vietnam's friendship with Venezuela as he sought to focus on tying up oil and gas deals, including a joint development fund. He said that "We (Vietnamese) are grateful for the support and solidarity that they (Venezuelans) have offered us until now." Triết said.

In March 2008 an agreement was signed to cooperate in tourism between Vietnam and Venezuela. President Nguyễn Minh Triết received the PDVSA's Vice President Asdrubal Chavez and stated that oil and gas cooperation would become a typical example of their multi-faceted cooperation. In 2009 the Venezuelan government approved $46.5 million for an agricultural development project with Vietnam.

== Relations with African nations ==
=== Libya ===
President Chávez's first trip to Libya occurred in 2001 after a personal invitation he received in 1999 from Muammar Gaddafi. During this short visit, they discussed the international situation, declining oil prices, and OPEC production levels. Felipe Mujica, leader of the opposition party MAS, accused Chávez of not reporting his trip to Libya and hiding it under a tour of Europe and Africa. In 2004, Muammar al-Gaddafi awarded Chávez in the city of Tripoli the "Al-Gaddafi International Prize for Human Rights" and Chávez called him a "friend and brother", affirming they "shared the same social view". In 2006, during Chávez's third visit, the leaders signed a general treaty of economical and cultural cooperation, and Chávez called for a mutual union against "American hegemony". Venezuela's former ambassador to Libya, Julio César Pineda, said in 2003 that Chávez was "coordinating an anti-American strategy with terrorist states" following his visit to Libya. Libya had been moving to repair ties with the United States (by offering compensations for the Lockerbie bombing, etc.) at the time that Chávez was setting himself up as South America's leading opponent of the Bush administration. Since the 2011 Libyan Civil War, Chávez was outspoken in support of Gaddafi and offered to broker talks between him and the opposition. Following Gaddafi's death, Chávez said in a statement "We shall remember Gaddafi our whole lives as a great fighter, a revolutionary and a martyr. They assassinated him. It is another outrage."

=== Madagascar ===
Venezuela and Madagascar established diplomatic ties on 17 November 2008 in a ceremony presided over by Reinaldo Bolivar, Venezuela's vice foreign minister for Africa, and Zina Adrianarivelo-Razifi, Madagascar's ambassador to Venezuela. The two officials signed legally sanctioned the move by signing a joint communique in Caracas. Bolivar said that until 1998, the Venezuelan government had not made an effort to approach African countries, though, since May 2005, Venezuela had started to take the prerogative to deepen political and diplomatic measures with the African continent. In this Venezuela added eleven embassies to the seven that had already existed in Africa. Razafi touched on the common themes Venezuela has made with other newer partners, namely that both suffered colonization and possess similarities in geography and history, as well as the possession of mineral and agriculture resources.

=== Zimbabwe ===
In 2008, Venezuela and Zimbabwe signed a cooperation deal to strengthen ties in energy, agriculture, economic, social affairs and culture. Venezuela's Deputy Foreign Minister for Africa, Reinaldo Bolivar, said "These agreements reinforce and strengthen relations between the two countries, south-south cooperation and the opportunity to grow and advance together. Zimbabwe is a country with excellent natural resources and very rich in minerals." The Zimbabwean signatory, Zimbabwe's Ambassador to Brazil, Thomas Bevuma, added support in saying that "Venezuela provides great assistance to our country through donations made through the World Food Program."

== Multilateral relations ==
=== Border disputes ===
Venezuela has longstanding border disputes with Colombia and Guyana but sought to resolve them peacefully. Bilateral commissions were established by Venezuela and Colombia to address a range of pending issues, including resolution of the maritime boundary in the Gulf of Venezuela. Relations with Guyana are complicated by Venezuela's claim to roughly three-quarters of Guyana's territory. Since 1987, the two countries held exchanges on the boundary under the "good offices" of the United Nations. The most pressing dispute involves Venezuela's claim to all of Guyana west of the Essequibo River; a maritime boundary dispute with Colombia in the Gulf of Venezuela is less of a priority. The Chávez administration was making moves to normalize these situations by moving towards repudiating Venezuela's outstanding territorial claims, but said it would review this process after the government of Colombia announced it was considering allowing the US military to build a base on disputed territory near the current Venezuelan border.

=== International Criminal Court ===
In March 2009, Chávez criticized the International Criminal Court for issuing a warrant for the arrest of Sudanese President Omar al-Bashir on charges of war crimes and crimes against humanity. Chávez said that the ICC "has no power to make a decision against a sitting president, but does so because it is an African country, the third world." He asked why the ICC didn't order the arrest of George W. Bush or of the President of Israel.

== See also ==
- Latin American integration
- Cuba–Venezuela relations
- Iran–Venezuela relations

== Bibliography ==
- Frisneda, Pedro F. (UPI, 5 April 2005). "Deciphering 'The Chavez Code'". Retrieved 28 October 2005.
- Hugo Chávez's address to the UN's 2005 World Summit
- Chavez Calls for Latin American Unity to Ensure the Region's "Freedom" Merco Press, 16 May 2009
- Is Venezuela in an Orbit of International Class Struggle? by Franz J. T. Lee, 19 May 2009
- Venezuela Chavez says "Comrade" Obama More Left-Wing by Reuters, 2 June 2009
- Like Sucre in Ayacucho! - Speech by President Hugo Chávez to the 6th Petrocaribe Summit
- "The Chavez Legacy" by Stephen J. Randall, Latin American Research Centre, University of Calgary, March 2013
