= Crystallex International Corporation =

Canadian mining company operating in Venezuela

- Type: Public
- Industry: Gold
- Headquarters: Toronto, Ontario, Canada
- Key people: Robert Crombie (CEO)
- Number of employees: 250 (2008)
- Website: www.crystallex.com

Crystallex International Corporation (OTCQB: CRYXF) is a Canadian corporation engaged in gold mining and exploration. It operates open-pit mines and exploration sites in Venezuela. Its current level of output characterizes it as a junior gold producer.

== Las Cristinas exploration & development ==
On June 14, 2007, Crystallex announced that it had completed all necessary steps in the permitting process and had received approval from the Venezuelan Ministry of the Environment to begin mining operations at its Las Cristinas site.

On April 30, 2008, Crystallex has been denied a key important environmental permit. Crystallex will not be able to construct the mine without the environmental permit.

== Venezuela arbitration ==
Crystallex has been litigating for losses relating to nationalization of the Las Cristinas mine in 2008. On April 4, 2016, Crystallex won their case in front of ICSID and was awarded compensation.

In August 2018, a US federal judge ordered the Venezuelan government to immediately pay bonds towards $1.2 billion to Crystallex or to provide shares of PDV Holding Inc., the parent company of Citgo.
