= Daktari (disambiguation) =

Daktari may refer to:

- Daktari, an American television series (1966-1969)
- Daktari (album), an album by Shelly Manne featuring music from the Daktari television series
- Daktari Ranch affair, an alleged plot to oust Venezuelan President Hugo Chavez
- Doctory, the practice of colonial-era medicine in the Indian subcontinent
