= 2010 Colombia–Venezuela diplomatic crisis =

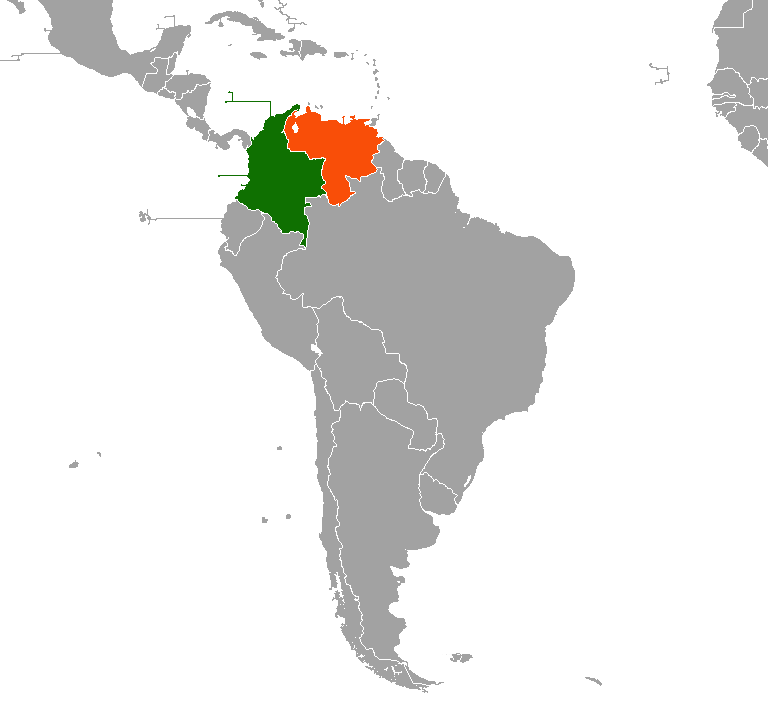
Colombia; Venezuela

The 2010 Colombia–Venezuela diplomatic crisis was a diplomatic stand-off between Colombia and Venezuela over allegations in July by Colombian President Álvaro Uribe that the Venezuelan government was actively permitting the FARC and ELN guerrillas to seek safe haven in its territory. The Revolutionary Armed Forces of Colombia (FARC), founded in 1964, is the largest of Colombia's left-wing guerilla groups, and the National Liberation Army (ELN), also founded in 1964, is another left-wing guerilla group inspired by the Cuban Revolution (1953–1959) and Marxist ideology. Uribe presented evidence to the Organization of American States (OAS) and in response, Venezuela broke off diplomatic relations with Colombia amid speculation of a possible war. Both countries eventually reconciled, with the help of the Union of South American nations (UNASUR) and agreed to re-establish diplomatic relations by mid-August.

== Existing issues at the Colombia-Venezuela border ==
Underlying the diplomatic crisis of 2010 are on-going border issues between Venezuela and Colombia. The Venezuela-Colombia borderlands are considered to be one of the most dangerous borderlands in the world, as the territory is overrun by a variety of non-state actors consistently involved in turf wars. These so-called turf wars are largely a result of the influence that organized crime groups (OCGs) have at the border.

Additionally, many of the border towns are extremely remote, worsening their already tumultuous economic situation. As a result, the government did very little to improve border town conditions, and had basically abandoned those living in these towns. This makes these borderland areas an easy target for criminal networks and non-state authorities to take control. For example, the United Self-Defense Forces of Colombia (AUC), a notorious right wing drug trafficking group, maintained control over certain areas of the border through extreme violence and intimidation, targeting both the locals and the government officials. Exacerbating issues in Colombia is their poor judiciary system and lack of effective communication between the different levels of their government. On the Venezuelan side, the situation is similar. Despite the presence of the Army and National Guard, the influence of groups such as FARC render it almost impossible for any intervention. General Oswaldo Bracho, an army commander, stated that the limited accessibility is compounded by the massive financial influx groups like FARC receive from drug trafficking and smuggling. This enables them to purchase and stockpile weapons to defend themselves, and influence local leaders through bribery. Additional issues, such as the lack of physical infrastructure, and the willingness of many of the border towns indigenous peoples to participate in government resistance, make the task of providing law and order to those that are suffering a daunting task.

== Declining Relations after the 2008 Andean Diplomatic Crisis ==
The 2008 Andean crisis involved a diplomatic standoff between Colombia, Ecuador, and Venezuela after the Colombian military crossed into Ecuadorian territory on March 1, 2008 killing over twenty FARC militants. Preceding the crisis, Hugo Chávez and Piedad Córdoba, a Colombian Senator, acted as the authorized mediators in the ongoing negotiations between the FARC and the Colombian government. Chávez was trying to create a humanitarian accord between the two groups by orchestrating the release of 45 FARC political kidnapping victims in exchange for suspected rebels that were jailed in Colombia. President Uribe suddenly terminated Chávez's role as mediator on November 22, 2007, after Chávez bypassed proper diplomatic channels to personally contact the Commander of the Colombian National Army, leading to a deterioration in relations. While speaking at a campaign rally Chávez asserted his disapproval of Colombia's actions: "For reasons I totally disagree with, Colombia's government... took a unilateral decision without consulting, without even a phone call. It's really regrettable." The dramatic and harsh rhetoric between the political leaders worried the public as the two neighboring countries are significantly economically connected and the 2005 Rodrigo Granda affair, where the Colombian government paid off Venezuelan officials to capture and transport a FARC rebel, was fresh in the minds of Colombians and Venezuelans. .

In early 2008, with assistance from US intelligence, the Colombian government wiretapped several phones used by the FARC in Southern Colombia. Colombia traced a call between Hugo Chávez and a prominent member of FARC leadership to near the Ecuadorian border. Colombian security forces acted on the wiretap information and entered Ecuadorian territory in the night on March 1, 2008, killing many FARC rebels, including Raúl Reyes. President Uribe considered alerting the Ecuadorian government but ultimately approved the attack without permission, leading to the death of 21 guerillas. During the raid, Colombian Special Forces retrieved multiple FARC devices, which the Colombian government alleged connected government officials in Venezuela and Ecuador to supporting FARC. Colombian General Naranjo alleged that the files show the Venezuelan government aiding the FARC since 1992, saying, "This implies more than cozying up, but an armed alliance between the FARC and the Venezuelan government." Dubbed the FARC files, the incident led to a further increase in tensions between Colombia and the two other countries.

== The 2010 Diplomatic Crisis ==
Venezuelan counter accusations of a Colombian security threat heightened in April 2010 after Venezuelan authorities arrested eight Colombians for planning to destabilize Venezuela's energy infrastructure. Six of the accused were arrested in Barinatas and two in the state of Aragua. Venezuelan authorities alleged that travel and identity documents retrieved from the arrested individuals showed strong ties to the Colombian army. The arrests reignited border tensions between the two countries. The Colombian government responded with a statement that it was committed to protecting the "human rights'' of its citizens regardless of where they lived. Although Colombia had a poor human rights record at the time, this comment was in line with the objectives of President Uribe's Democratic Security Policy.

In an escalation of the crisis, Venezuelan Foreign Minister Nicolás Maduro recalled his country's ambassador from Colombia in reaction to Colombian allegations of a Venezuelan government-sponsored establishment of FARC and ELN guerrilla camps on the Venezuelan side of the border. On 15 July, Colombia made a formal complaint to the OAS which then held a special meeting on 22 July to preside over allegations that Venezuela hosted Colombian rebel camps on its territory. Previously, Venezuelan authorities had criticized the OAS as an organization controlled by the US. On the same day of the OAS meeting, Venezuelan President Hugo Chávez announced that "for dignity's sake" he was breaking off relations with Colombia. The Venezuelan government cited Colombia's neglect of a bilateral approach to resolving diplomatic issues as disappointing. Colombian diplomats were given 72 hours to leave Venezuela. Days later, Chávez would threaten to cut off oil exports to the United States after the U.S expressed their support of Colombia, if Colombia launched a military attack. President Chávez commented, "if there was any armed aggression against Venezuela from Colombian territory or from anywhere else, promoted by the Yankee empire, we would suspend oil shipments to the United States even if we have to eat stones here." He also canceled a trip to Cuba on grounds that "the possibility of an armed aggression against Venezuelan territory from Colombia" was higher than it had been "in 100 years."

This was followed by a denial from Colombian President Uribe that plans were underway to attack Venezuela amid Chávez's call that Uribe was "capable of anything." Uribe's spokesman, César Velásquez, said "Colombia has never thought of attacking [Venezuela], as its President has told his country in a clearly deceptive move. [Colombia] continues to insist [on the application of international law to ensure Venezuela] complies with its obligation not to harbor Colombian terrorists." These statements echoed growing concerns of a serious escalation of conflict along the border.

== Reconciliation ==
On August 10, just days after Colombia's new president, Juan Manuel Santos, was sworn in at a ceremony attended by Venezuela's Maduro, both he and Chávez agreed to restore bilateral relations and re-establish diplomatic ties "based on transparent and direct dialogue." The turnaround in relations came despite each president representing opposite sides on the political spectrum. Chávez represented the United Socialist Party of Venezuela, whereas Santos represented the Union Party for the People, which supports liberalism. Meeting in Santa Marta, Colombia, both presidents expressed optimism that the two countries would establish a more productive and stable relationship. Santos said he received assurances from Chávez that he "will not permit the presence of guerrillas or terrorists on Venezuelan soil." This was a result of mediation by UNASUR Secretary General Néstor Kirchner who said "We Latin Americans have proved we can solve our own problems." Venezuela acknowledged that Colombia has a legitimate right to enter into military agreements with the United States, "as long as none of those accords affects the sovereignty of neighbors or becomes a threat."

Santos was upbeat regarding the meeting. "President Chávez and I are putting the interests of our people above personal conveniences." In turn Chávez told Santos, "Count on my friendship." The two presidents pledged to send ambassadors to each other's capital cities, and work on further details involving finance and military issues.

Some of these developments towards reconciliation between the two countries, specifically comments made by Chávez, have come across as puzzling given the duality of his personality and feelings towards Colombia throughout this entire crisis. In 2008, after sending military tanks to disputed borderlands, Chávez met with President Uribe in Washington and was seen hugging him in various photos. Shortly after this meeting, the two began to refer to one another as a gangster and a terrorist. When Uribe was replaced by Santos, Chávez was quick to label him a "threat to the entire region," only to agree to end the border crisis two months later.

Scholar Gregory Wilpert articulates how fear of economic decline and security concerns were the main factors contributing to the rapid regaining of cooperation between the two countries. Before Uribe and Chávez severed ties, annual trade had reached an all-time high of $7 billion; after the break, trade plunged to about $1 billion. Despite the fluctuating relations between the two countries, maintaining the economic relationship remains vital: "While there is a significant trade imbalance between the two countries— Venezuela imports far more from Colombia than vice versa— both countries depend on this trade. They are close neighbors, and using alternative markets or suppliers is costly for both." Both countries also experienced an economic recession between 2009-2010, partially due to the global economic crisis of 2008, and regaining trade relations was seen as a necessity for regaining stability.

Many of the dynamics between the two countries can be explained by their security concerns of each other. Colombia and Venezuela share an expansive border, and maintaining order is often difficult. Colombia sees Venezuela as a threat because of its connection to insurgency groups like the FARC. At the same time, Venezuela sees Colombia as threatening because of its frequent paramilitary incursions across the border and Colombia's connection to the United States. The 2008 Andean crisis and the 2010 diplomatic crisis are good examples of how rapidly tensions can flare between the two countries and result in a delicate security situation.

The conflict between the two states gives the United States more justification for involvement in Colombia and Latin America as a whole. Describing the relationship between Santos and Chávez, the former U.S. ambassador to Colombia articulated that both men were likely to be in power in their nations for much of the coming decade, "so it would be in both of their interests to learn to get along." The rapid rapprochement between the two leaders, once Santos took the presidency, can be understood through the context of Colombia and Venezuela seeking a return to economic and political stability after a period of turmoil.

Despite the two leaders agreeing to restore their diplomatic ties, many questions still lingered on both sides. The actual catalyst of the diplomatic crisis–whether or not Venezuela was actually harboring rebel groups–was never fully determined. This left many people wondering whether or not this had actually occurred, and what the possible ramifications for Venezuela could have been. The role of the U.S. (Colombia used U.S. troops on their bases) was also left undecided as a part of the agreement. Venezuela did participate in the 2012 Colombian Peace Process, however, and demonstrated its ability to be perceived as a stable country in the region.

== International Reactions ==
Prior to Venezuela becoming involved in March 2008, the United States Department of State was largely staying out of the conflict other than voicing their support for Colombia against the FARC. But when it came to the conflict with Ecuador the Bush Administration claimed that "This, for us, is an issue between the governments of Colombia and Ecuador."

By June 2010, the messaging coming from the United States had changed. Then-Secretary of State Hillary Clinton visited Colombia to meet with President Uribe to discuss the border crisis and more. In addition, she also met with the two candidates running to replace Uribe in an election later that same month. Clinton was adamant in voicing her support for Colombia: "The United States will continue to support the Colombian people, the Colombian military and their government in the ongoing struggle against the insurgents, the guerrillas, the narco-traffickers who would wish to turn the clock back." She went on to emphasize "that the United States will stay a strong partner with Colombia in meeting the security needs Colombia faces." This comment is a clear nod to the threats voiced by President Chavez of Venezuela. In response to Mrs Clinton's remarks, Chavez of Venezuela retorted that "She's free to like me or not." After, he sang the words "I'm not loved by Hillary Clinton... and I don't love her either."

Just over a month later, the United States reiterated their support for Colombia with harsher dialogue towards Venezuela and President Chavez. During a press briefing in the U.S. State Department, a spokesman said, "Venezuela is obliged, as a member of the United Nations, the OAS, and UNASUR, to deny terrorist groups the ability to operate within its territory. We've been concerned about this for some time and it's one of the reasons why, since 2006, Venezuela has been judged not to be fully cooperating on anti-terrorism efforts."

Chavez's quick drawback from diplomatic negotiations after the emergency OAS session caused members of the OAS to quickly regret hosting the session in the first place. In a statement by the OAS which included representatives from Mexico, Brazil and Chile, they asked for the countries to resume negotiations as soon as possible to address the dire need to "combat drug trafficking and terrorism on a united front, so that America can continue to be a continent of peace."

== See also ==
- Colombia–Venezuela relations
- 2008 Andean diplomatic crisis
