= Quaiser =

Quaiser may refer to:

== First name ==
- Quaiser Khalid (born 1971), officer of the Indian Police Service

== Surname ==
- Daniel Quaiser (born 1975), Swiss designer, musician, and singer
- Neshat Quaiser (born 1952), Indian sociologist and writer
