= Alberto Builes =

Colombian lawyer and politician

Governor of Antioquia
- In office January 1, 1998 – December 31, 2000
- Preceded by: Álvaro Uribe Vélez
- Succeeded by: Guillermo Gaviria Correa

Mayor of Bello

Personal details
- Born: 1946 (age 79–80) Bello, Antioquia, Colombia
- Party: Colombian Conservative Party
- Education: University of Medellín
- Profession: Lawyer, politician

Jesús Alberto Builes Ortega (Bello, 1946) is a Colombian lawyer and politician who served as Mayor of Bello and Governor of Antioquia.

== Biography ==
He graduated as a lawyer from the University of Medellín and began his political career as a councilor of Bello. He later became the mayor of the same municipality and worked in the private sector as manager of the football team Atlético Nacional.

In 1994, he ran as a candidate for the Departmental Assembly of Antioquia but was kidnapped by the Guerrilla Coordinating Board.

After his release in 1997, he ran for the Governorship of Antioquia for the Colombian Conservative Party, defeating former mayor of Medellín and former governor of Antioquia, Álvaro Villegas Moreno.

After leaving the governorship, Builes has remained active in politics. In 2006, he launched his candidacy for the House of Representatives but did not win the seat.
