= Mauricio Carradini =

Colombian industrial engineer

Mauricio Carradini is a Colombian expert in strategy and intelligence who served as Presidential Advisor for Communications during Colombian President Álvaro Uribe Vélez's second term.

== Education ==
Mauricio Carradini graduated from Gimnasio Campestre High School. He is an industrial engineer from Universidad de los Andes has a MSc. in public policy and is a PhD(c) in national security strategy and non-conventional war from St Antony's College, Oxford University. He has postgraduate studies in defense planning and resource management at the National Defense University; in civil-military relations at the Naval Postgraduate School and in crises and disasters' management at the Federal Emergency Management Agency.

== Professional life ==
Presidential Advisor for Communications during President Álvaro Uribe Vélez's second term.

He succeeded Jaime Bermúdez. Carradini, Bermúdez and Álvaro Uribe Vélez attended Oxford University at the same time. Strategic Advisor and Special Advisor at the Ministry of Defense in Colombia for six ministers. During his time at the ministry and participated in projects like the reform of the Military Forces, the design of Plan Colombia, the restructuring of the Ministry, and the military intelligence reform. Media reports announced in 2002 that President Álvaro Uribe Vélez was creating an intelligence vice-ministry at the ministry of defense for Mauricio Carradini. He has been management consultant with Booz•Allen & Hamilton Inc. in the Andean Region and North America.

== Academia ==
He has been lecturer at the University of Los Andes, the Aerial Military Institute (Colombia), the National Defense University, the Colombian Escuela Superior de Guerra and the University of Oxford.

He sits in the Steering Committee of the body overseeing intelligence studies at the University of Oxford, the Oxford Intelligence Group.
