= Alberto Uribe Sierra =

Colombian businessman (1932–1983)

Alberto Uribe
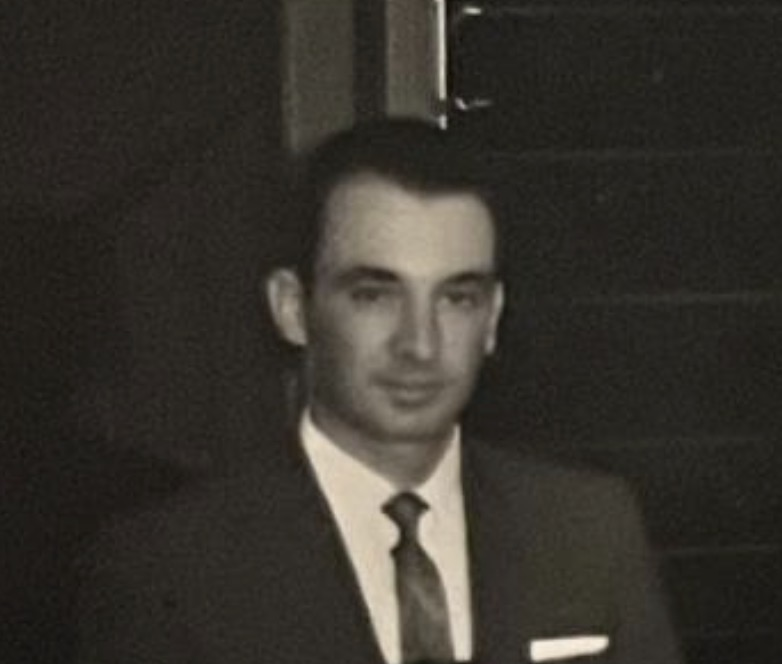
- Born: November 25, 1932; Andes, Antioquia, Colombia
- Died: June 14, 1983 (Aged 50); San Roque, Antioquia, Colombia
- Cause of death: Homicide
- Occupations: Rancher; businessman
- Political party: Liberal
- Spouse: Laura Vélez Uribe (until 1983)
- Children: 6, including Álvaro
- Parent(s): Luis Elías Uribe González; Celia Sierra Velásquez

Alberto Uribe Sierra (November 25, 1932 – June 14, 1983) was a Colombian rancher, and businessman. He was the father of Álvaro Uribe (President of Colombia in 2002–2010), Jaime Alberto, and Santiago Uribe Vélez.

He was assassinated in 1983 in his hacienda La Guacharaca. His family attributes the murder to the fact that he had previously resisted a kidnapping attempt by the Revolutionary Armed Forces of Colombia (FARC-EP). The FARC-EP denied responsibility for the murder.

== Biography ==
He was born in Andes, Antioquia, the 25th of November 1932. He was the son of Luis Uribe González and Celia Sierra Velásquez and was married to Laura Vélez Uribe. Alberto, along with the Mejía Correa de Corbeta family, was one of the owners of the Hacienda La Carolina, in Santa Rosa de Osos (Antioquia), a bullfighting ranch.

== Family ==
Alberto had 6 children from two relationships. He had 5 children with his wife, Laura Vélez Uribe. He only had his youngest son, Camilo Uribe Uribe, with Marta Elena Uribe Soto despite never marrying her. His eldest son, Álvaro Uribe, was the director of Aerocivil, Mayor of Medellín, senator, governor of Antioquia and president of Colombia. He was a first cousin of politician and former senator Mario Uribe Escobar.

=== Links to drug traffickers ===
Through family and friendship connections, Alberto Uribe is associated with Colombian drug traffickers, especially with the Medellín Cartel. However, there are no family ties linking Uribe Sierra to Pablo Escobar. There are no known judicial proceedings that have been initiated against Alberto Uribe for acts related to drug trafficking.

In 1984, a year after his death, Alberto Uribe Sierra's helicopter was found in the largest cocaine laboratory in the eastern Llanos, known as Tranquilandia, owned by the Medellín Cartel. The helicopter that his son, Álvaro Uribe, used to get to the farm to pick up his father's body was also said to be owned by Pablo Escobar, according to a newspaper with the events. However, the Colombian Civil Aeronautics certified that the helicopter did not belong to Escobar.

His mother, Celia Sierra, has no family ties to Juan Carlos Sierra, alias El Tuso, a drug trafficker and paramilitary extradited to the United States.

His wife, Laura Vélez Uribe, was the niece of Roberto Vélez, who was married to the sister of cattle rancher Fabio Ochoa and father of the drug traffickers of the Ochoa Vásquez Clan. Consequently, Laura was related by affinity in the sixth degree with the Ochoa Vásquez (Colombian legislation only contemplates the relationship of consanguinity or affinity up to the fourth degree).

Their son Jaime Alberto Uribe (died 2001) had a daughter in 1980 with Dolly Cifuentes - Ana María Uribe Cifuentes - when Dolly was just 16 years old. Dolly is the sister of Francisco "Pacho" Cifuentes, who was accused of having been Pablo Escobar's pilot. Dolly was captured for drug trafficking and association with Chapo Guzmán in 2011. In 2012 she was extradited to the United States and sentenced to 5 years in prison after pleading guilty before a federal judge. Although it has been claimed that Ana María Uribe Cifuentes was also captured, there is no record of that capture, or of a place of detention, as she was not requested for extradition, and there is no known trial or conviction against her. It is not currently listed on the OFAC list.

== Assassination ==
On June 14 of 1983, Alberto was murdered in his hacienda La Guacharaca, located in San Roque, Antioquia, at 50 years of age.

=== Official Version ===
Alberto was aboard a helicopter with his children Santiago and María Isabel. Following the helicopters landing, the pilot warned the Uribes that intruders had entered the hacienda. It was then that he realized that it was FARC-EP, who had previously threatened to kidnap Uribe Sierra. After exchanging gunfire (as reportedly Alberto confronted them with gunfire) three guerrilla members shot him twice, killing him.

Authors such as Wilson Orozco accuse his son Álvaro Uribe of having sponsored paramilitary groups in revenge for the murder of his father. The FARC-EP denies responsibility for the murder.
