= Michael Shinagel =

5th Dean of Continuing Education and University Extension
- In office 1977 – 2013
- Preceded by: Reginald H. Phelps
- Succeeded by: Huntington D. Lambert

Personal details
- Born: April 21, 1934
- Education: Oberlin College
- Profession: College administrator
- Website: MichaelShinagel.com

Michael Shinagel is the former dean of the Division of Continuing Education and University Extension at Harvard University, and the longest serving dean in Harvard's history.

== Early life ==
He was a child in Vienna, Austria, and his family had to escape Europe after the rise of Adolf Hitler and the start of World War II. As a refugee, he attended school in New York City and briefly attended Cornell University in 1951 and 1952, studying agriculture. He served with the US Army in Korea, and then completed his degree at Oberlin College on the G.I. Bill. He earned his doctorate in English Literature at Harvard University on a national fellowship.

== Career ==
After completing his doctorate in 1964, he began an academic career of teaching and administration at Cornell University from 1964 to 1967. He then moved on to Union College from 1967 to 1975. At Union he served two three-year terms of chairman of the English Dept. and in 1972 was promoted to professor of English.

Shinagel was the fifth dean of the Extension School, having been appointed in 1977 and serving until 2013. Prior to being named dean, he was the Director of Continuing Education and University Extension from 1975 to 1977. He was also formerly Master of Quincy House.

== Books ==
He is the author of a history of the Harvard Extension School, The Gates Unbarred, and a memoir, Holocaust Survivor to Harvard Dean: Memoirs of a Refugee's Progress.

== Works cited ==
- Shinagel, Michael (2010). The Gates Unbarred: A History of University Extension at Harvard, 1910 - 2009. Harvard University Press. ISBN 978-0674051355.
- Shinagel, Michael (July 7, 2016). Holocaust Survivor to Harvard Dean: Memoirs of a Refugee's Progress. Author Solutions Incorporated. ISBN 978-1-5245-0960-6.
