= Universidad de Medellín =

University of Medellín
- Universidad de Medellín
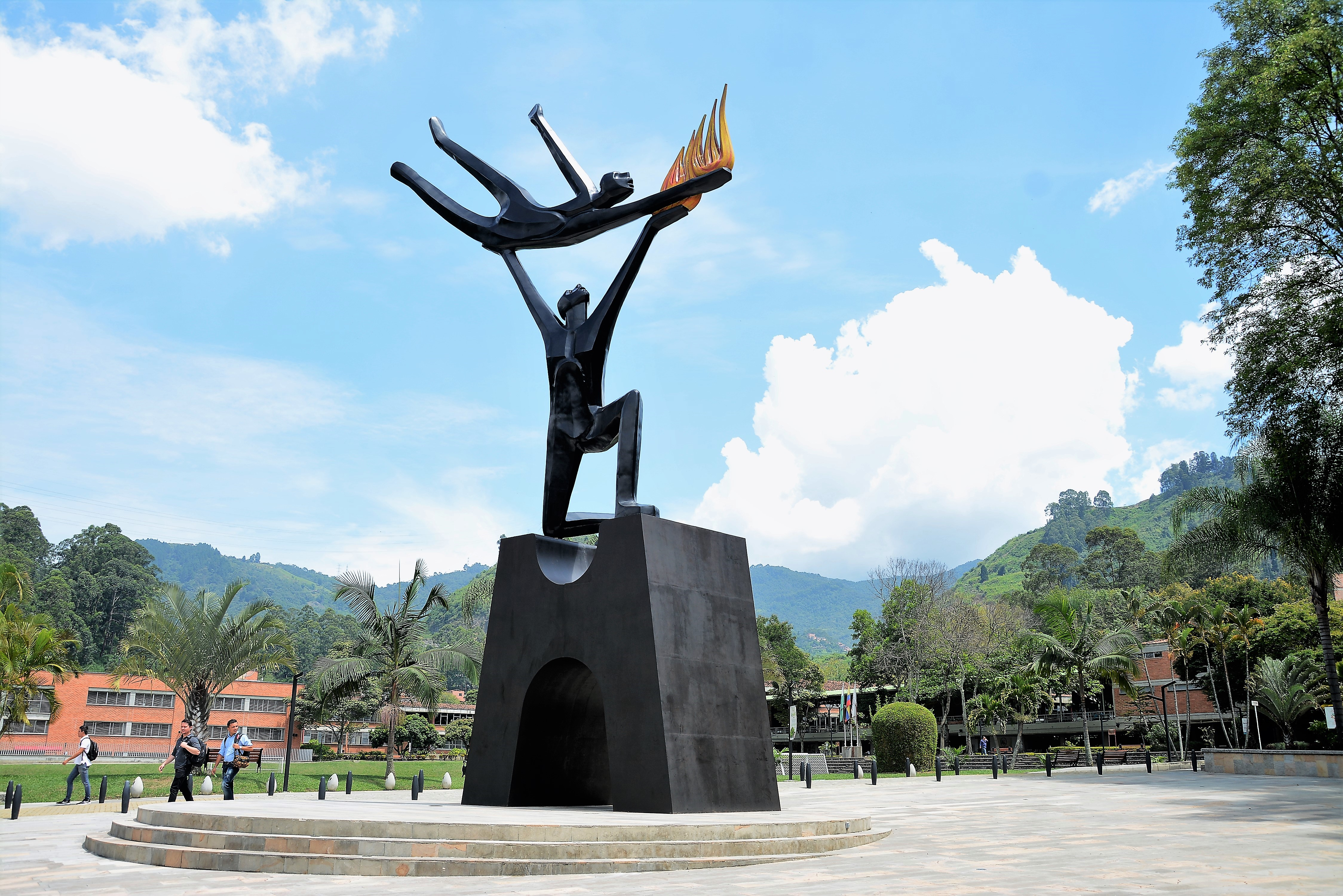
- Plaza de la Libertad, Universidad de Medellín
- Motto: Ciencia y Libertad
- Motto in English: Science and Freedom
- Type: Private
- Established: 1950
- Principal: Federico Posada Restrepo
- Location: Cra. 87 N° 30 - 65, Medellín, Antioquia, Colombia; 6°13′52″N 75°36′41″W
- Campus: 361,248 square metres (3,888,440 sq ft); Urban
- Website: udemedellin.edu.co

The Universidad de Medellín (UdeMedellín or UdeM) is a private university in Medellín, Colombia. It offers 27 undergraduate programs, 36 specializations, 21 masters, and six doctoral programs. It was founded on February 1, 1950, by a group of prominent professors and intellectuals in response to the intolerance and political persecution that existed in the country, with the goal of creating a secular and welcoming institution apart from the political ideologies of the time.

It has seven academic faculties such as Law, economic and administrative sciences, engineering, communication, design, basic sciences and social and human sciences.

In 2021, the National Ministry of Education renewed the university's Institutional Accreditation of High Quality until 2027.

== History ==
=== 1960-1990 ===
In 1961, the Institution was moved to the University Citadel of Belén los Alpes.

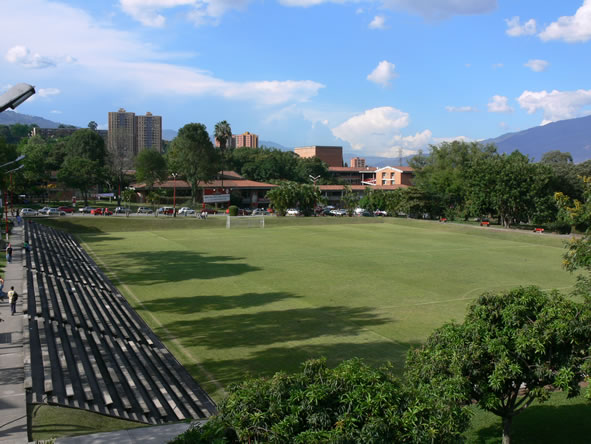
Main soccer field in 2006.

In 1965, the first soccer field was inaugurated.

=== 1990-2000 ===
In the 1990s, Néstor Hincapié Vargas, an indigenous politician from Peñol, was chosen as rector. He had previously served as governor of Antioquia in 1999, the secretary of Government and Citizen Support, of Education and Administrative Services of the department of Antioquia and manager of the Charity of Antioquia. He administered the university during 20 years alongside Aura Marleny Arcila, who during this period acted as the president of the university and the chancellor of Medellín during four periods.

During this time, the rector acquired more than 23 properties around the country and outsourced the surveillance and cleaning of the institution to the firms Serconal and Seiso, both controlled by the university and which also contracted hospital and surveillance services with the state.

=== 2000-Present ===
In 2015, the university was involved in a scandal for the election of comptroller general of Antioquia in which Julián Bedoya, then the representative of the Chamber and ex-president of the Assembly of Antioquia, and Orfa Nelly Henao, president of the Assembly, had adjusted the convocation to choose the departamental comptroller so that the post would be given to professor Carlos Molina, given that the requirements were written with the help of said professor and included various requirements that only favored himself, such as holding a doctorate from a university abroad. This was demonstrated through the leaking of various e-mails that culminated in the non-election of the candidate.

In 2019, Aura Marleny Arcila was re-elected for the fifth time as the chancellor of Medellín, during which time she held the dual position of being president of the council of the university and president of the council of Medellín.

In 2019, both the rector Néstor Hincapié and councilwoman Aura Marleny supported the candidate of David Ospina to occupy the post of comptroller of Antioquia, but his election was rejected by the city councils for fear that he had used his privilege to obtain election to this office. The rectorship of Néstor Hincapié ended in 2020 in a political scandal when the district attorney pressed criminal charges against the then-rector and various professors for having apparently given Julian Bedoya, who had not fulfilled the lawful requirements, a law degree in exchange for votes in favor of the university's political group. Aura Marleny also resigned from her position inside the council. Both continue being part of the group of 100.

In 2020, the Council elected Federico Restrepo Posada as the rector of the university.

=== Rectors ===
- Libardo López Restrepo
- Germán Medina Angulo
- Eduardo Fernández Botero
- Bernardo Trujillo Calle (1962-1964)
- Juan Peláez Sierra (1964)
- Germán Vélez Gutiérrez
- Gustavo Rendón Gaviria
- Luis Carlos Calle Calle
- Orión Álvarez Atehortúa
- Eduardo Franco Posada
- Pedro Pablo Cardona Galeano
- Ignacio Cadavid Gómez
- Iván Gómez Osorio
- Jaime Tobón Villegas
- Enrique Olano Asuad
- Fernando Jaramillo Jaramillo
- Jorge Mario Ortiz Abad
- César Augusto Fernández Posada
- Néstor Hincapié Vargas (2000-2020)
- César Guerra Arroyave (2020)
- Federico Restrepo Posada (2020-Actual)
