= Rodrigo Granda affair =

International incident between Venezuela and Colombia

The Rodrigo Granda affair was an international incident that increased tension between Venezuela and Colombia between December 2004 and February 2005.

== Events ==
On 13 December 2004, Rodrigo Granda, a member (the "foreign minister") of the Revolutionary Armed Forces of Colombia (Fuerzas Armadas Revolucionarias de Colombia, or "FARC"), was captured by individual Venezuelan officials in Caracas, Venezuela, and transferred to Cúcuta, Colombia (a departmental capital on the two nations' common border), where he was arrested by the Colombian authorities on 14 December.

Granda had been an uninvited attendant to the Second Bolivarian People's Congress in Caracas, an international gathering of supporters of the Bolivarian Revolution in Venezuela.

Colombia admitted that it offered and paid a reward for Granda's capture, although it initially denied that he had been captured in Caracas and transported to Cúcuta, only stating that he had been officially arrested by authorities in Cúcuta. The FARC issued a statement claiming that the Venezuelan state should have protected Granda during his visit, and Granda's lawyer said that Granda held dual Venezuelan and Colombian citizenship. The Venezuelan interior ministry dismissed the FARC's claims, stated that Granda's Venezuelan identification card had been obtained through the use of forged documents and, in addition, that Venezuela had been unaware of Granda's visit and therefore had never decided for or against protecting him. Venezuelan authorities stated that their country would have cooperated with Colombian authorities through official channels, but rejected what they considered an undue violation of their sovereignty.

== Diplomatic tensions ==
This event set off a series of diplomatic tensions, with Colombia questioning Venezuela's lack of cooperation in law enforcement actions against guerrillas in its territory, the United States supporting Colombia's position and outright accusing Venezuela of harboring these guerrillas, Venezuela accusing Colombia of violating its sovereignty, and the FARC accusing Venezuela of doing too little to protect its members. Venezuela demanded an apology from Colombia, recalled its ambassador for consultations, and suspended bilateral (government-to-government) commercial agreements. Individuals and enterprises in both countries suffered, but Colombian border regions were especially affected by the crisis.

On 15 February 2005, Venezuelan President Hugo Chávez and Colombian President Álvaro Uribe held a summit meeting that they both said resolved the diplomatic tensions. Both presidents stated that their nations and governments would henceforth avoid discussing similar issues through the media, and instead they would communicate directly through official diplomatic channels, in order to cooperate more effectively in matters of their mutual interest. They both credited Cuba, Peru, and Brazil for helping with mediation, while Chávez blamed the United States for precipitating the crisis and trying to prevent its resolution. Commercial relations and agreements were fully restored.
