= Democratic security =

Democratic security or Democratic security policy was a Colombian security policy implemented during the administration of former President Álvaro Uribe (2002-2010). It was unveiled in June 2003.

== Objectives ==
It has been stated that this policy seeks to achieve the following objectives, among others:

- Consolidate State control throughout Colombia to deny sanctuary to terrorists and perpetrators of violence.
- Protect the population through the increase of State presence and a reduction in violence.
- Destroy the illegal drug trade in Colombia to eliminate the revenues which finance terrorism and generate corruption and crime
- Transparently and efficiently manage resources as a means to reform and improve the performance of government.

Several of these objectives stem from a belief in that the Colombian government should protect Colombian society from the effects of terrorism and the illegal drug trade, and in turn society as a whole should have a more active and comprehensive role in the government's struggle against illegal armed groups such as the FARC and ELN guerrillas or the paramilitary AUC, in order to ensure the defense and continued existence of the opportunity for both leftwing and rightwing political parties to engage in free and open debate, along with all the other aspects of democratic life.

== Application ==
The previously mentioned objectives would be achieved through:

1. engaging the civilian population more actively
2. supporting soldiers
3. increasing intelligence capacity
4. reinstating control over national roads
5. demobilizing illegal groups
6. integrating the armed forces services
7. increasing defense spending.

== Results ==
The Democratic Security Policy is credited with major achievements in improving Colombia’s violence indicators between 2002 and 2010, including reductions in annual homicide rates (–51%), murders of mayors (–67%), union leaders (–84%), and Indigenous people (–47%), as well as decreases in terrorist attacks (–71%) and kidnappings (–90%). It also led to an increase in cocaine seizures (+64%), the weakening of the FARC-EP and ELN guerrillas, and the Colombian State’s recovery of territorial control over parts of the country. Other positive outcomes include:

- The rescue of 15 hostages in Operation Jaque, who were being held by the Revolutionary Armed Forces of Colombia (FARC-EP), including 11 soldiers, 7 American citizens, and Íngrid Betancourt.
- The deaths of members of the FARC Secretariat, including Raúl Reyes in Operation Phoenix, and the murder of Iván Ríos by one of his subordinates — whom the Colombian government deceived and never paid the promised reward, until he himself was eventually killed in 2019.
- The Colombian government recorded the demobilization of 52,403 members of illegal armed groups between 2002 and 2010 — 31,671 from paramilitary groups, 16,340 from guerrilla forces, and the remainder from criminal gangs.

== Controversy ==
The democratic security policy has become controversial inside and outside Colombia since the beginning of its application. Most of the critics and detractors of this policy, including human rights NGOs (such as Human Rights Watch and Amnesty International) and political opposition groups (such as the Colombian Liberal Party and the Independent Democratic Pole), share the assessment that it focuses too much on the military aspects of the Colombian Armed Conflict, relegating complex social, human rights and economic concerns to a secondary role, superseded by the perceived need for increased security.

Several critical analysts have accepted that there have been many factual improvements in the areas of security (for the most part) and human rights (to a lesser degree), but they also question the exact validity and application of some of the statements, pointing out serious problems, in particular (but not only) paramilitary related, which remain a source of grave concern.

Several of the critics also argue that, due to the increased degree of involvement of the civilian population, that this policy overexposes civilians to the dangers of the conflict, becoming potential targets for any abuses committed both by the illegal armed groups and the government's security forces. From this point of view, the resulting polarization caused by the long-term application of the policy would also be considered an obstacle to the achievement of a negotiated solution of the conflict with FARC and ELN guerrillas.

A number of the more radical critics, in particular leftwingers and sympathizers or members of FARC, also consider that "democratic security" may be a euphemism for the controversial national security policy that existed throughout South America during the later stages of the Cold War, seeking to stop the spread of Communism. This would imply that the application this policy would also lead to the repression of any form of dissent and opposition to the current administration, including student movements and political parties. Supporters of the policy (and most other critics) tend to not consider the previous argument to be accurate, arguing that there are several differences between both policies, in particular that the democratic security policy is being implemented by a legally elected government, in an environment where a number of democratic and political liberties are guaranteed, despite the continuing conflict.
