= Daniel Quaiser =

Swiss designer, musician and singer (born 1975)

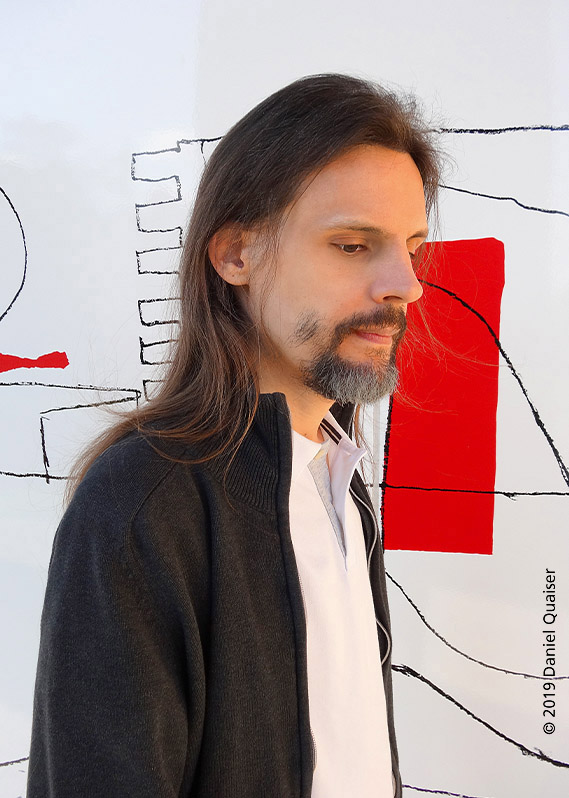
- Daniel Quaiser 2019 in Zurich, Switzerland

Background information
- Born: June 7, 1975 (age 50); Adliswil
- Genres: Classical
- Occupation(s): Designer, musician, singer (baritone)
- Website: https://www.danielquaiser.ch/

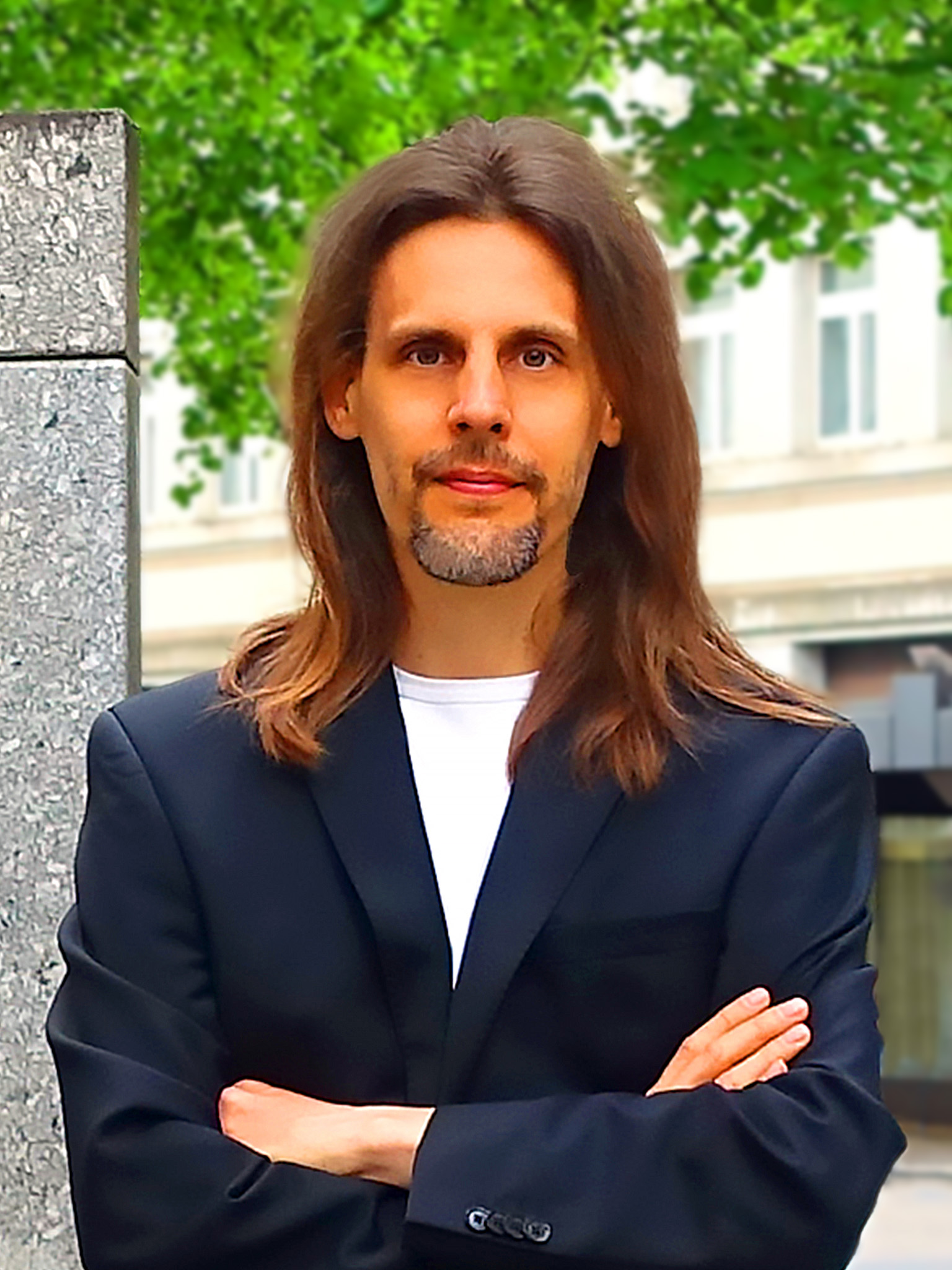
Daniel Quaiser 2018 in Zurich, Switzerland

Daniel Quaiser (born 7 June 1975 in Adliswil, Switzerland) is a Swiss designer, musician and singer (baritone).

== Life and career ==
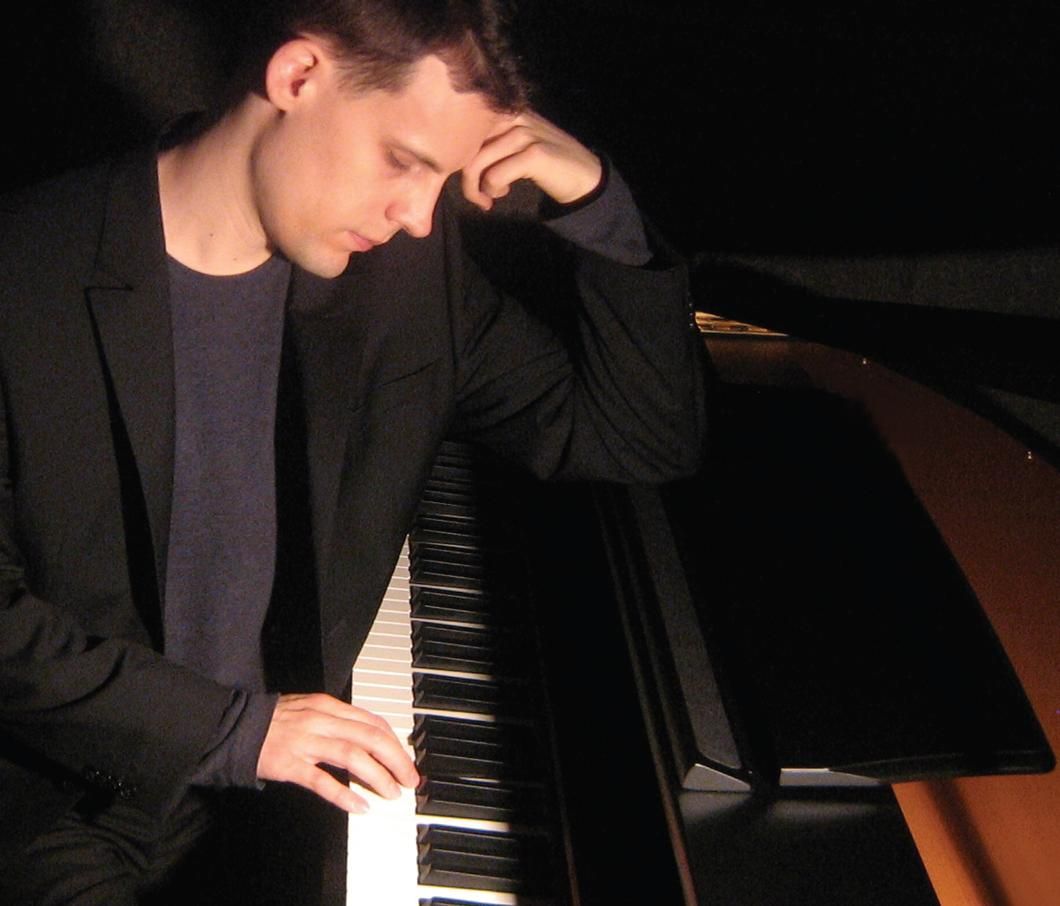
Daniel Quaiser 2008 in Adliswil, Switzerland

Quaiser was given his first voice, oboe and piano lessons at the Wiedikon High School in Zurich. In 1999, after having passed his school-leaving examination, he studied with Lena Hauser (voice), Martina Bovet (teaching voice), Hans Adolfsen (accompaniment) and Daniel Fueter (lied) at the Zurich University of the Arts. In 2005, he graduated with honors in Voice Education and won the first prize of the Werner und Berti Alter-Stiftung. Besides, he was given an appointment to teach in the conservatory of Zurich.

With Scot Weir (voice), Paul Suits (accompaniment) and Martin Zeller (chamber music), Quaiser continued studying voice at the Zurich University of the Arts. In 2007, he graduated in Concert Singing. He took master classes with Margreet Honig, Wolfgang Holzmair, Oliver Widmer and Jan Schultsz. His repertoire includes classical, romantic and contemporary songs, song cycles, oratorio and opera arias, as well as pop songs, folksongs and songs written by himself.

Quaiser appeared in concerts, chamber music recitals and lieder recitals. Under the direction of Anna Jelmorini, Pascal Mayer, Stephen Smith, Karl Scheuber and Beat Schäfer, he sang in the vocal ensemble and the chamber choir of the Zurich University of the Arts. With his vocal band Take Heart, he was performing on Schweizer Radio DRS and Schweizer Fernsehen. Concerts and CD recordings with own written songs followed. 2008 14 Lieder von der Liebe: Theater Stok, Zurich; Villa Boveri, Baden. 2009/2010 Menschenkinder: Kulturhaus Helferei, Zurich; Praxiskeller, Rothrist; Reformierte Kirche, Adliswil; Zunfthaus zur Waag, Zurich. Concert and CD Sonne und Wind in preparation.

From 2007 to 2018, Quaiser worked as a creative director at the Swiss advertising agency KGT Quaiser besides his musical activities. In 2018, Quaiser founded his own agency for design and music. Quaiser describes his field of activity as follows:

Design and music are areas that complement each other. Skill and experience are prerequisites for successfully promoting a brand. After studying music at the Zurich University of the Arts, I was fascinated to realize creative projects, to incorporate emotions from music into the design.

== Discography of own written songs ==
- 14 Lieder von der Liebe, iMusician Digital, 2008
- Menschenkinder, iMusician Digital, 2009
- Sonne und Wind, iMusician, release unknown
