= Doctory =

Term for modern medicine in the Indian Subcontinent

Doctory or daktari is a referral term for practising modern medicine arising in the Indian subcontinent during colonialism. The concept, has been framed by historical sociologist Neshat Quaiser and is now part of the social history of South Asian medicine & health and colonial studies.

== Concept ==
In the Indian subcontinent, modern medicine—which became closely associated with colonialism—was referred to as "doctory" or daktari ilaj. The doctor and doctory ilaaj emerged as powerful symbols of colonialism and the colonial state. The doctor was one of the most visible representatives of European knowledge. He looked, dressed and spoke differently. He was certainly not equivalent to the Hakim. The doctor with his stethoscope created an aura and mystery around himself. He symbolised 'modern medicine'. In fact, being visited by a doctor became a symbol of high status and modernity.

It is a label for the practice of indigenous medicine in South Asia. In social history of South-Asian medicine, this concept has been in discussion.

According to Nandani Bhattacharya, the term 'doctory' has a deep political resonance.

== Emergence ==
During the period British rule in India(1700s to 1900s), western medicine had begun to take over and was spreading with time. The administration hired many Indians as "native doctors" in the inferior medical service, which had been primarily made up of Europeans, after they had training in Western medicine. Most of the colonial government's support for indigenous medical systems was progressively withdrawn. The assertions made by Western medicine was that it is a more logical and “superior” medical system caused the practitioners of these systems, the 'vaidyas' and 'hakims', to lose a great deal of their status. While some of them turned into purists and defended and promoted their systems, others incorporated Western medical concepts and practices into their training and clinical work.

Initially, the loose adoption of this Western medical practice, looks and behaviour came out as a 'doctory'. Later, it changed into a bigger spectrum and was given symbolic meaning.

== See also ==
- Unani medicine
- History of medicine
