= Daktari Ranch affair =

Alleged 2004 coup in Venezuela

The Daktari Ranch affair was a hypothesized plot to overthrow Hugo Chávez, who was the President of Venezuela. According to Chávez and his supporters, the capture of several dozen individuals in May 2004 and other developments prove the existence of the purported coup plot, while the anti-Chávez opposition discounts the notion that any deeper meaning can be imputed to the raid and capture of the Colombian detainees or to other events.

== Raids ==
On 9 May 2004, Venezuelan police raided a ranch in Baruta, a municipality on the outskirts of the Venezuelan capital of Caracas. A total of fifty-five Colombian men were arrested. The raided ranch was owned by Roberto Alonso, a Cuban exile active in the anti-Castro movement and a leader of the Venezuelan opposition group Bloque Democrático. Shortly thereafter, they arrested 71 more men at a neighboring ranch that was owned by Gustavo Cisneros. On the night of 2 August 2004, members of the National Guard and the Disip raided the ranch "El Conuco", searching for stolen military armament allegedly meant to be used in an aborted coup d'état, but nothing was found.

== Criminal charges ==
One of the detainees allegedly stated that they had been offered 500,000 Colombian pesos to work on the farm. Upon their arrival at the farm, however, they were told that they instead would need to prepare for an attack on a Venezuelan National Guard base. The goal of the putative attack was allegedly to steal weapons and fully arm a 3,000-member militia.

According to opposition spokespeople and some of the people arrested, many of the Colombian nationals were merely unemployed and impoverished peasants. The family of an arrested Venezuelan National Guard Captain gave interviews to the press, denouncing the arrests as political persecution against those who disagreed with the Venezuelan government. He was said not to be recognized when he was presented to the Colombian detainees. Some women and underage children were also included among those captured alleged paramilitaries. The latter were speedily repatriated to Colombia by Venezuelan authorities. The men were caught wearing Venezuelan Army uniforms. Six Venezuelan military officers were also reported to be in custody.

== Trials and sentences ==
During the judicial process, the number of the accused shrank to 100 as several of the accused were deported or collaborated with Venezuelan authorities. In October 2005, the Venezuelan prosecution asked for a sentence of six years for 57 to 62 of the accused, while declining to charge between 38 and 43 of the men, which were considered to have been led to Venezuela under false pretenses and/or had apparently suffered mistreatment from the alleged coup plotters.

On 25 October 2005, a Venezuelan military tribunal found 27 of the men guilty, sentencing them to six years in jail, and ordered the release and deportation of the other 73 Colombians. Three out of the six Venezuelan military officers were also condemned by the tribunal.

== Presidential pardons ==
In August 2007, Hugo Chávez granted a presidential pardon to 41 Colombian convicts who were not involved in "human rights violations or war crimes". The 27 Colombians who were sentenced in October 2005 were among those pardoned and deported to Colombia with the exception of those being investigated for homicide (a corpse was found in the ranch where the men were captured).
