= French Colombians =

- (France) (Colombia)

Regions with significant populations
- Bogotá, Barranquilla, Cartagena and Santa Marta

Languages
- Colombian Spanish, French, Basque and Occitan

Religion
- Predominately Roman Catholicism

French Colombians (French: Franco-Colombien, Spanish: franco-colombianos) are Colombian citizens of full or partial French ancestry, or French-born people residing in Colombia. The French form the fourth largest European immigrants in Colombia after the Spanish, Italians and Germans.

== History ==
During the early 18th century, many French explorers traveled to the Caribbean coast of Colombia, called Urabá. At around 140 French registered as Protestants who undertook to grow cocoa beans. After a violent conflict between the European explorers and the indigenous, the survivors were able to flee from war and began settling in the department of Córdoba.

Some of the French veterans of the French Revolutionary Wars (1792 - 1802) and of the Grande Armée of Napoléon during the Napoleonic Wars (1803 - 1815) participated in the liberation armies, which was a mission of Jean Baptiste Boussingault arrived in Colombia in 1822. French zoologist François Désiré Roulin, signed a four-year contract to teach mineralogy and chemistry at the School of Mines, and to serve the role of mineralogist researcher and engineer of the mines of the Viceroyalty of New Granada.

In 1855, a group of French immigrants landed in Colombia that deeply impacted the history of mining in the Antioquia region during the second half of the 19th century. The members who worked in the mining were Count Adolphe de Gaisne de Bourmont, Adolphe and Paul de Bedout, Augustin de Colleville, Henri Brèche and Eugène Lutz. Bourmont bought in 1856 a part of the shares of the Titiribí smelting farm, which belonged to the English Tyrell Moore, and also of different mines located in the area. The collapse of most French agricultural, industrial or mining companies stand out, including the fruitless attempt by a French geographer Élisée Reclus, who installed a crop in Sierra Nevada de Santa Marta, or the French Sinu Company.

Until 1870, nearly all French immigrants to Colombia originated from the Pyrenees. French immigrants in Colombia came from Southwestern France, including Béarn, the Basque Country (Basses-Pyrénées), Rouergue and Charente. Others were from Paris and the Savoy region.

As of 2017, only 6,400 French citizens are residing in Colombia. Most of them are highly concentrated in Bogotá.

== Institutions ==
- Lycée Français Louis Pasteur
- Lycée Français Paul Valéry de Cali
- Lycée Français de Medellin
- Lycée Français de Pereira

== Notable people ==
- Sandra Bessudo, marine biologist.
- Íngrid Betancourt, Franco-Colombian politician.
- Emilio de Brigard Ortiz, prelate of Catholic church.
- Paulina Vega Dieppa, Miss Universe 2014
- Mario Yepes, retired professional football player.
- Juan Carlos Lecompte, author.
- Belisario Betancur, 26th President of Colombia
- Patricia Janiot, journalist and news anchor.
- Mario Laserna Pinzón, educator and politician.
- Michelle Rouillard, model, presenter and actrees.
- Patrick Delmas, actor.
- Javier Hernández Bonnet, sports journalist and commentator.
- Nicole Regnier, former football player
- Benoît Chassériau, minister of the Police of the Free state of Cartagena de Indias and friend of Simon Bolivar

== See also ==
- Colombia–France relations
- White Colombians
- French diaspora
