= Colombia–France relations =

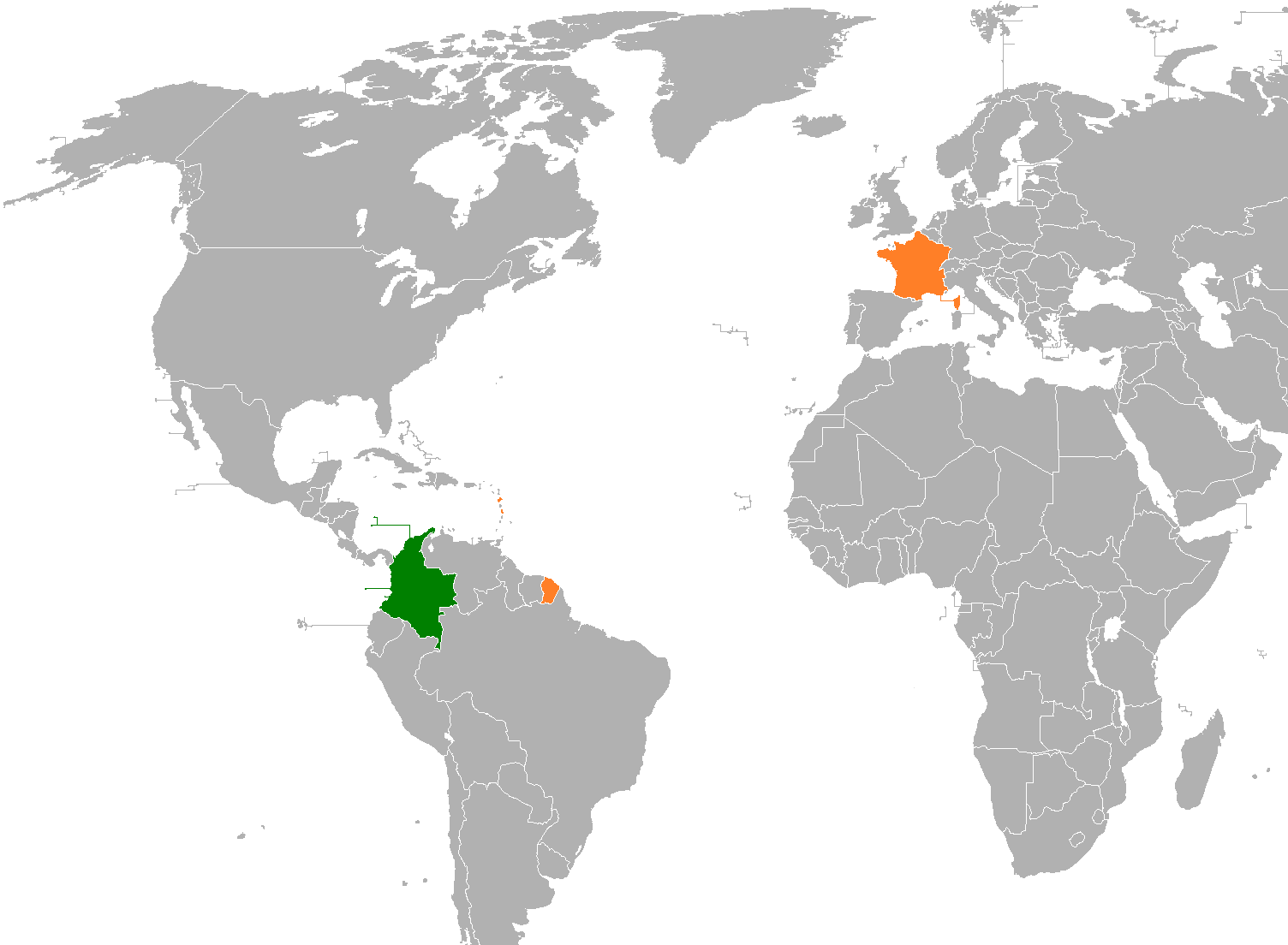
- Colombia: France

Colombia and France maintain bilateral relations. Both nations are members of the OECD and the United Nations.

== History ==
First early contact between France and the territory of present-day Colombia took place in May 1697 during the French Raid on Cartagena which was a successful attack by the French on the fortified city of Cartagena as part of the Nine Years' War. During the early 18th century, many French explorers traveled to the Caribbean coast of Colombia and to the Gulf of Urabá. However, Colombia was not a destination of mass immigration for the French. Approximately 200 French nationals immigrated to Colombia between 1843 and 1851.

During Colombia's war of Independence against Spain; many French nationals fought in the war for Colombia against Spanish forces, most notably Emmanuel Roergas de Serviez (known by his Spanish name of Manuel de Serviez) who became a brigadier general in the patriot army. Soon after Independence, Colombia and France established diplomatic relations on 1 January 1830. France became an important cultural and intellectual model for the Colombian elite and ruling classes of the 19th century.

In September 1964, French President Charles de Gaulle paid an official visit to Colombia, becoming the first French head-of-government to visit the South American nation. During his visit, President de Gaulle met with Colombian President Guillermo León Valencia.

Since the 2000s, the French Government had been a strong proponent of the Colombian initiative for Humanitarian exchange between the Revolutionary Armed Forces of Colombia (FARC) and the Colombian Government. Furthermore, the French Government was actively involved in promoting the release of dual Colombian-French national Íngrid Betancourt.

In January 2017, French President François Hollande paid a visit to Colombia, the first in 25 years since the visit of President François Mitterrand. That same year, both nations celebrated the France-Colombia Year which marked a year of cultural events celebrating the richness of both nations. In June 2017, Colombian President Juan Manuel Santos paid a visit to France to initiate the dual year celebrations and met with French President Emmanuel Macron.

In June 2019, Colombian President Iván Duque Márquez traveled to Paris to discuss the Colombian peace process and the ongoing Crisis in Venezuela and increased migration of Venezuelan nationals to Colombia.

Colombia is the 5th largest global recipient of French Development Aid (and the largest in the Americas). Much of the aid goes for operations that directly contribute to post-conflict in Colombia and rural development.

== High-level Visits ==
Presidential visits from Colombia to France

- President Andrés Pastrana Arango (2001)
- President Álvaro Uribe (2008)
- President Juan Manuel Santos (2011, 2014, 2015, 2017)
- President Iván Duque Márquez (2018, 2019)

Presidential visits from France to Colombia

- President Charles de Gaulle (1964)
- President François Mitterrand (1985, 1989)
- President François Hollande (2017)

== Bilateral agreements ==
Both nations have signed several bilateral agreements such as an Agreement on Cultural Exchanges (1952); Agreement on Air Transport (1953); Agreement on Technical and Scientific Cooperation (1963); Agreement for Cultural Cooperation (1979); Agreement for University Cooperation (1996); Agreement for Technical Military Cooperation (1996); Agreement in Criminal Matters and Mutual Legal Assistance (1998); Agreement on the Reciprocal Promotion and Protection of Investments (2014); Agreement to Avoid Double Taxation and Prevent Tax Evasion with respect to Income and Wealth Taxes (2015); Agreement on a Vacation and Work Program (2016); Agreement on Financial Cooperation (2016); Agreement for Tourism Cooperation (2017); and an Agreement of Cooperation in Matters of Environment and Natural Resources (2019).

== Resident diplomatic missions ==
- Colombia has an embassy and a consulate-general in Paris.
- France has an embassy in Bogotá.
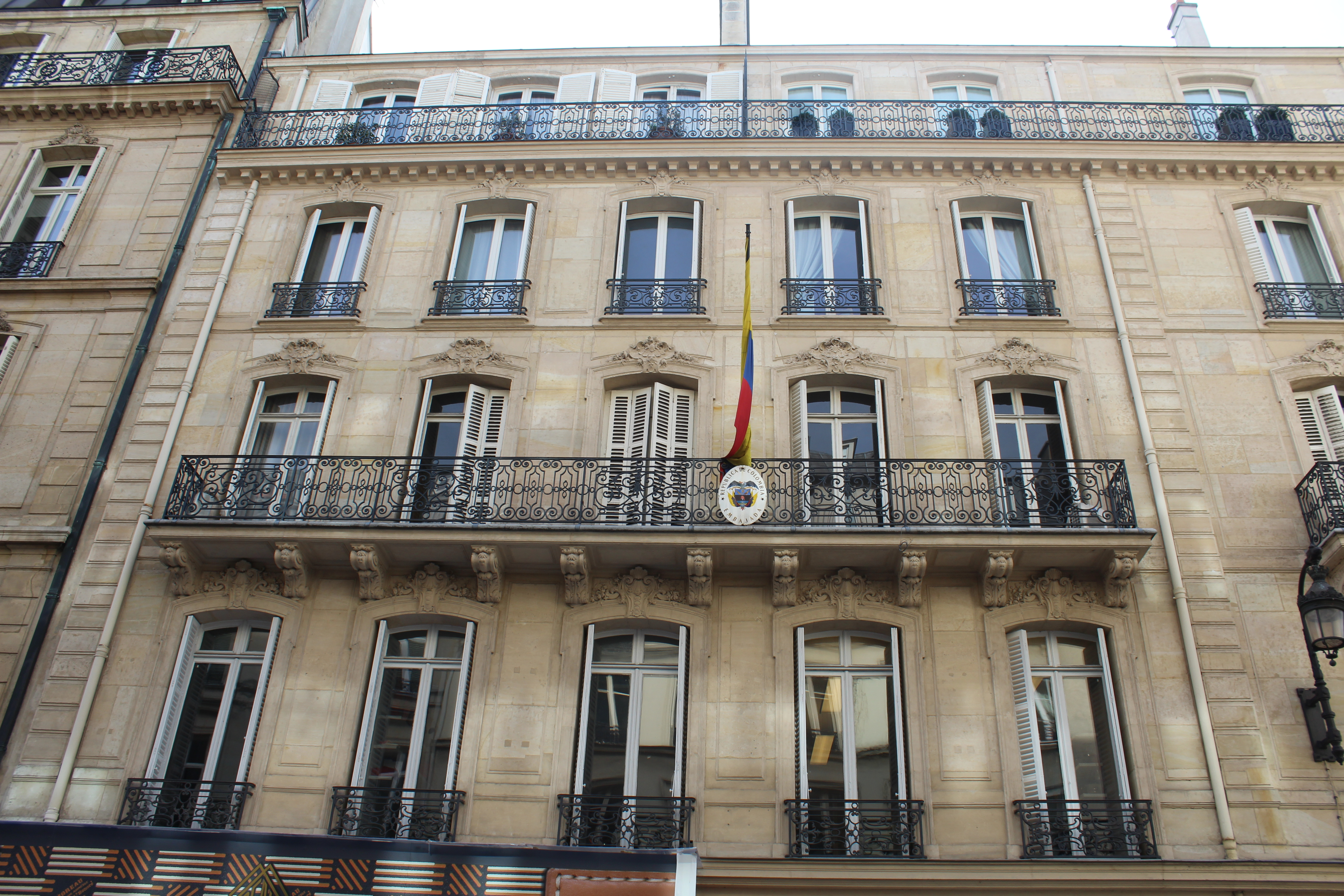
Embassy of Colombia in Paris

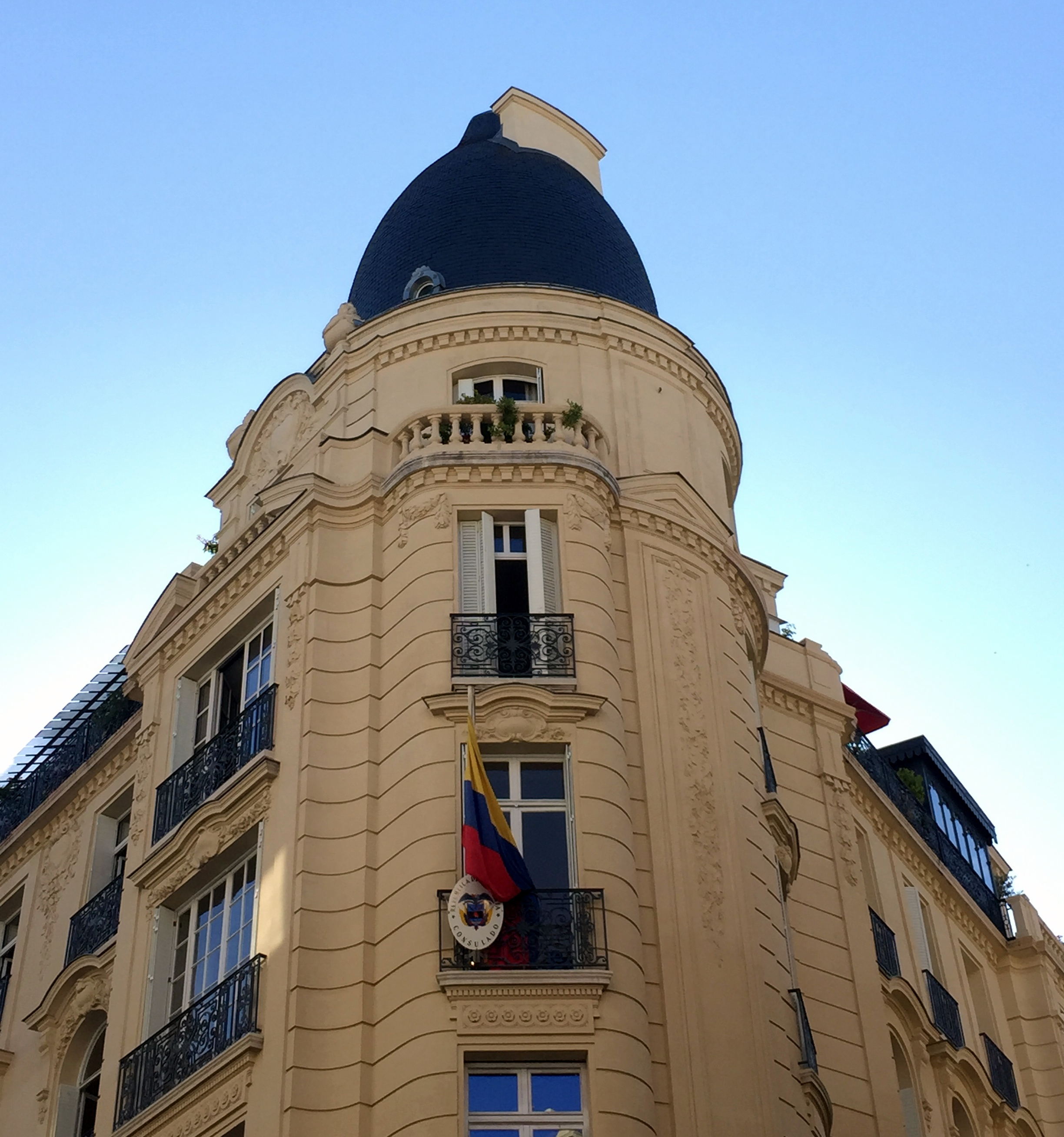
Consulate-General of Colombia in Paris

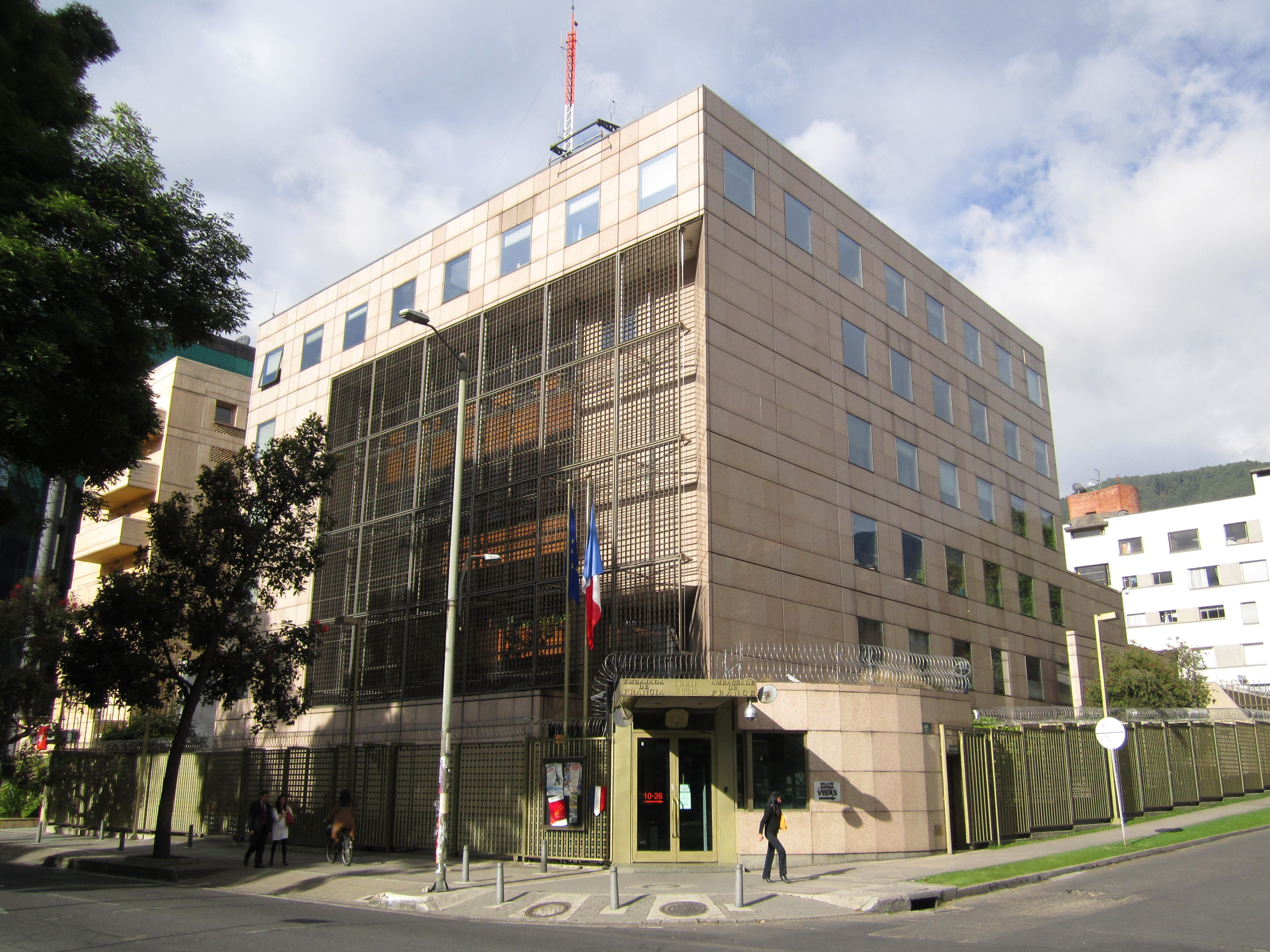
Embassy of France in Bogotá

== See also ==
- Foreign relations of Colombia
- Foreign relations of France
- French Colombian
