= William Parra =

William Parra may refer to:

- William Parra (journalist) (born 1966), Colombian journalist
- William Parra (footballer) (born 1995), Colombian footballer
