= Otto Gutierrez =

Colombian journalist and diplomat

Otto Gutiérrez

Press Secretary of Colombia
- In office 21 January 2013 – 17 October 2013
- Preceded by: Jhon Jairo Ocampo
- Succeeded by: Jhon Jairo Ocampo
- In office 7 August 1998 – 2 May 2000
- Preceded by: William Parra (journalist)
- Succeeded by: Samuel Salazar

Personal details
- Born: Otto Gutiérrez; 19 October 1963 (age 62) Cáqueza, Colombia
- Spouse: Sandra Gómez (m. 1988)
- Children: 2
- Education: Universidad de La Sabana

Otto Gutiérrez (born October 19, 1963) is a Colombian journalist who served as the press secretary of the President of Colombia from 1998 to 2000 and January to October 2013. He also served as the Consul General of Colombia in Houston, Texas from 2000 to 2002.

== Life and career ==
Otto Gutiérrez was born October 19, 1963 in Cáqueza, Colombia. When he was young, his family moved to Bogotá, Colombia. He graduated from the Universidad de La Sabana with a degree in journalism.

Gutiérrez started his career as a news reporter at Noticiero TV Hoy. There, he worked with Andrés Pastrana who was the owner of company. During his time there, Gutiérrez won the Simón Bolívar award for best television interview in 1993. After being promoted multiple times, he became the deputy news director.

== Press Secretary ==
During the 1998 Colombian presidential election, Gutiérrez was named the press secretary of Pastrana's New Democratic Force party. Pastrana did well and he won the presidential election. After this, Gutiérrez was named press secretary for President Pastrana. The following year, Colombia experienced a large natural disaster called the 1999 Colombia earthquake. This earthquake killed hundreds of people and destroyed several buildings near Armenia, Colombia. There were also reports of residents looting stores. President Pastrana responded to the crisis by traveling to the affected area and ordering the military to restore order. During this crisis, Gutiérrez communicated to the public that the President would stay in the area until the situation was resolved. Gutiérrez continued to serve in this position until May 2, 2000 when he was appointed Consul General of Colombia in Houston, Texas.

In 2012, during the presidency of Juan Manuel Santos, Gutiérrez worked as an advisor to Foreign Minister María Ángela Holguín. Gutiérrez impressed President Santos during this time, and in 2013, Santos named Gutiérrez as his press secretary. This was the second time that Gutiérrez served as press secretary of the President of Colombia and this was the second President to pick him for this position.

== Personal life ==
Gutiérrez is the son of Carlos Gutiérrez and Cándida Torres. He is the youngest of twelve children. In 1988, he married Sandra Gómez who is also a journalist. They have two sons named Juan José and Santiago.
