= Operation 14 July =

2003 failed French operation in Colombia

Operation 14 July (French: Opération 14 juillet) was a failed French operation to rescue Íngrid Betancourt from the Revolutionary Armed Forces of Colombia (FARC) in July 2003. Organized by French Foreign Minister Dominique de Villepin, the mission failed to make contact with FARC guerrillas and eventually returned home. After details of the operation leaked in the Brazilian press, a political scandal erupted in France.

== Background ==
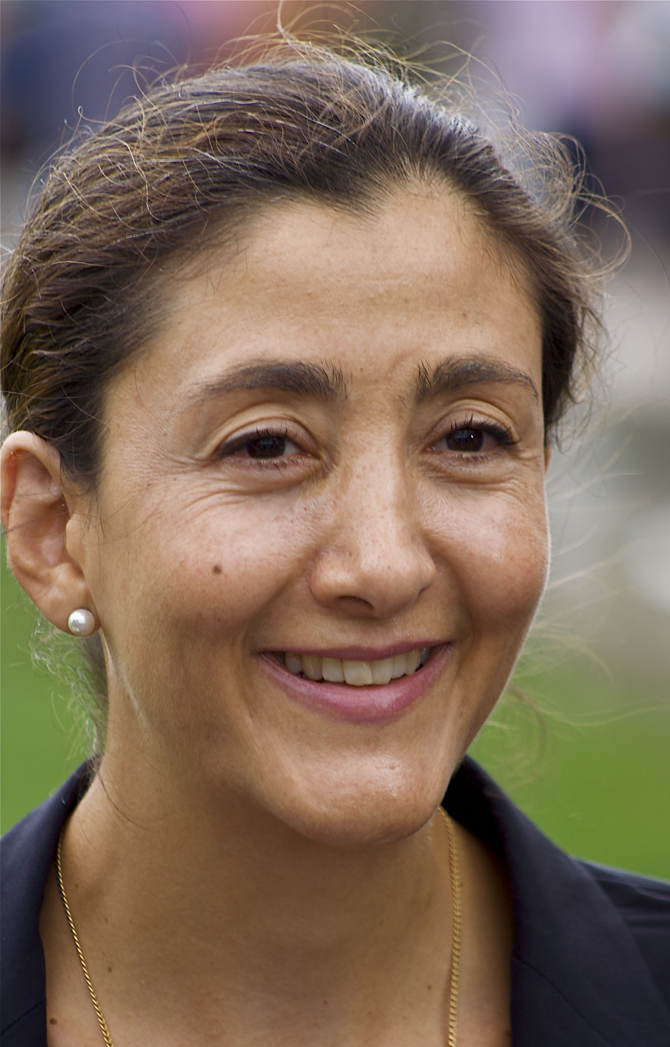
Íngrid Betancourt in 2008

Íngrid Betancourt, a French-Colombian citizen and candidate in the 2002 Colombian presidential election, was taken hostage by the FARC in February 2002 after traveling into the Colombian demilitarized zone. Betancourt had lived and studied in Paris as well as married a Frenchman, and the hostage situation received widespread media coverage in France.

== Operation ==
=== Contact ===
In early July 2003 a peasant from Putumayo Department approached Colombian security officials claiming to be a FARC intermediary. The peasant stated that FARC might soon free Betancourt because she was sick, leading Colombian President Álvaro Uribe to quickly call Betancourt's mother, Yolanda Pulecio, to come meet him. Pulecio and her daughter, Astrid Betancourt, immediately came to Uribe's office where they met the contact, who told them to go to Leticia, Colombia on 5 July and wait for further instructions.

Astrid contacted the French government on 8 July, and Dominique de Villepin, then Minister of Foreign Affairs, charged senior advisor on Latin America and deputy chief of staff Pierre-Henri Guignard to plan a rescue mission. Villepin had taught Íngrid at the Institut d'Études Politiques de Paris in the early 1980s, and had been a close friend of her and Astrid since.

=== Mission ===
On 8 July, Pierre-Henri Guignard and an 11-person team of Direction Générale de la Securité Exterieure (DGSE) personnel boarded a C-130 Hercules transport in Évreux for the Brazilian city of Manaus, landing the next day. The group decided to bring along medical supplies, and possibly crates of dollars and weapons.

At the same time, Astrid Betancourt and Íngrid's second husband Juan Carlos Lecompte followed the initial FARC instructions to go to Leticia. A Catholic priest named Father Gonzalo had come along with the family to act as an intermediary and to bring them by riverboat to San Antonio de Ica, where FARC was to make contact. Yet the FARC never initiated contact with the group, so Astrid decided to return to Leticia and wait. Astrid later stated that she had waited from 5 to 14 July on the border with Brazil.

Soon after landing in Manaus, Brazilian federal police asked to perform a normal check of the aircraft, but were denied after the group claimed diplomatic immunity. The following day, four members of the group, including Guignard, a doctor, and two intelligence agents, paid US$5,900 for a round-trip flight to São Paulo de Olivença under the notion that they were on a hiking trip; others in the group were seen going to the Hotel Tropical with metal cases. The four-man French group was under police watch the moment it left because the airline company, Rico, was contracted by Brazilian police and worked as an informant. Upon landing the team took a water taxi to the Flamingo Hotel, and Guignard subsequently went to find Father Pedro, a priest who was to help the rescue mission.

In the meantime, Cleilton de Abreu, the pilot of the chartered Caraja aircraft, grew suspicious that the group wanted to seize and divert his aircraft after he had been asked by the Frenchmen whether the plane was able to land in rough terrain and whether he had ever flown at night. De Abreu decided to fly to a nearby town and alert police, who assured him that the group was under surveillance and that he should return to São Paulo de Olivença.

On 11 July the French group in São Paulo de Olivença flew back to Manaus after no sign of Betancourt, only to be detained by Brazilian federal police upon arrival. Once again claiming diplomatic immunity, the only information they divulged was the address of the DGSE headquarters in Paris. Two days later the French C-130 left Manaus for France in the early afternoon.

== Revelation ==
On 19 July the Brazilian weekly Carta Capital was the first to report that a French military aircraft carrying 11 passengers had landed at the Eduardo Gomes International Airport in Manaus on 9 July and left on 13 July bound for French Guiana. The magazine published a photo of the aircraft, and reported that Brazilian police requests for more information had been rebuffed by the passengers who claimed diplomatic immunity. Carta Capital also suggested that arms were to be exchanged for Betancourt's freedom.

== Political scandal ==
When first questioned about the operation, French President Jacques Chirac, who was abroad at the time, said that "this kind of operation would not have happened without me being informed, and I was not informed." The Elysée repeated to Le Monde that he was not informed of the attempt. Prime Minister Jean-Pierre Raffarin, also abroad at the time, released a similar denial. However, after being presented with the photographs of the C-130, the men claimed that the mission was planned "at the highest level of government." The spokesperson for the Elysée also stated that Chirac gave his agreement in principle to the Betancourt family's request to send a medical plane.

Interior Minister Nicolas Sarkozy, who was also unaware of the operation, was on an official trip to Colombia when news leaked. Following the revelations, he confirmed that there was an attempted mission to "obtain information on her state of health." "When the family of a person who has been a hostage for more than a year tells you that there is a chance to save her, it is necessary to seize it."

Both Brazil and Colombia denied knowing about the operation, with Colombia particularly worried over the possibility of French negotiations with FARC. Foreign Minister Villepin, who organized the mission, came under harsh criticism for the operation; the Brazilian deputy foreign minister accused him of giving false information, and a Brazilian deputy said they "would do better not to treat us like one of their African colonies."

According to Astrid Betancourt, Villepin had in fact alerted Brazilian authorities about the mission, something Brazil denied. She also said that she asked for the Colombian authorities not to be warned so as not to hinder the rescue.

== See also ==
- Operation Jaque
- Operation Emmanuel
