= LFM =

LFM may refer to:

- Liber feudorum maior, a medieval Catalan cartulary
- Linear feet per minute in gas flow measurement
- La Familia Michoacana, former Mexican drug cartel
- Linear frequency modulation, a radar waveform also known as a Chirp
- Language Freedom Movement, a 1960s political organisation concerned with the status of the Irish language

French schools

- Lycée Franco-Mexicain, Mexico City
- Lycée Français de Madrid, Spain
- Lycée Français de Mascate, Muscat, Oman
- Lycée Français de Medellin, Colombia
- Lycée Français Montaigne or Lycée Montaigne de N'Djamena, Chad
- Lycée français de Moscou
