= Humanitarian exchange =

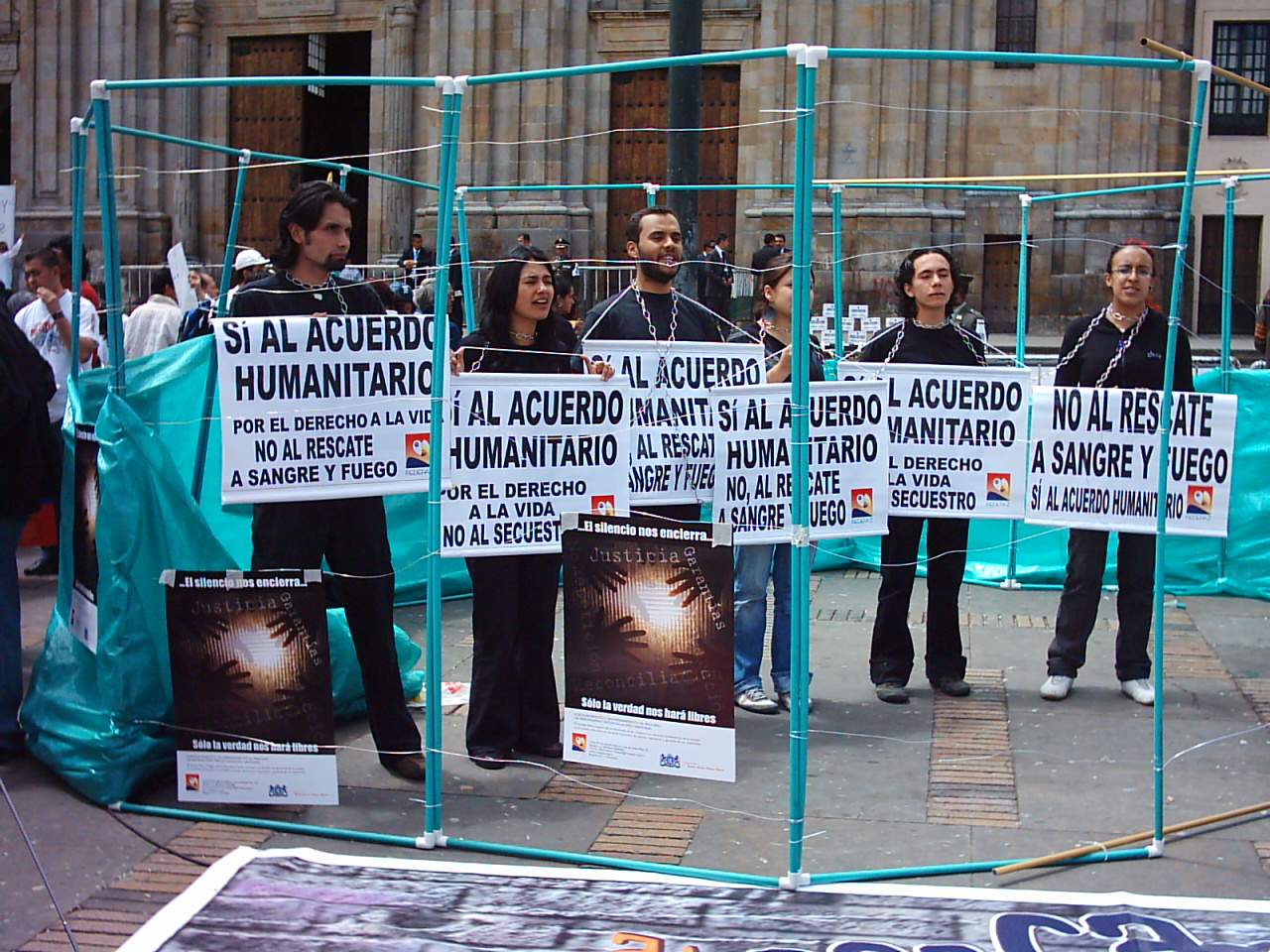
Colombian protesters against kidnappings and military rescue operations of FARC hostages. The signs read "yes humanitarian accord" "no bloody military rescue". The green frame simulates the concentration camps in which the hostages held by FARC are kept in the jungle.

The Humanitarian Exchange or Humanitarian Accord (Spanish: Acuerdo Humanitario, Intercambio Humanitario or Canje Humanitario) referred to a possible accord to exchange hostages for prisoners between the Revolutionary Armed Forces of Colombia (FARC) guerrilla group and the Government of Colombia.

The President of Colombia Álvaro Uribe and the FARC conditioned the agreement, which was primarily pushed by the families of the victims, certain Colombian politicians and numerous governments that include France and Venezuela. After years of combat in the Colombian armed conflict the FARC guerrilla group kidnapped numerous government officials, politicians and military and police personnel to pressure the release of their members jailed by the government.

== Demands ==
The FARC guerrillas originally demanded that in order to proceed with the humanitarian exchange, the government must demilitarize a zone, which are the municipalities of Pradera and Florida in the southern Department of Valle del Cauca. The government of Colombia maintained that this is impossible and non-negotiable. However, after Ingrid Betancourt and three American contractors were rescued in July 2008, the FARC dropped that demand because they no longer had their most famous bargaining chips.

The FARC guerrillas eventually dropped their prisoner exchange demand and released their last political hostages in April 2012.

== Early years ==
The FARC began to kidnap in the early 1970s to obtain ransoms and maintain their operations. During the government of President Ernesto Samper the FARC began to kidnap high-profile government, political, military and law enforcement figures to push for the liberation of their comrades held in prisons by the government.

The FARC assaulted numerous villages and military garrisons and captured hundreds of military and police personnel, for example, Jhon Frank Pinchao. Members of the government were also kidnapped ranging from senators like Jorge Gechem Turbay, presidential candidate Ingrid Betancourt, 12 Valle del Cauca Deputies, 3 U.S. contractors who were working with Plan Colombia, among other cases.

=== Law of Exchange ===
During the presidency of Andrés Pastrana, the government and the FARC maintained a demilitarized zone in El Caguan in an attempt to negotiate the possibility of a peace process. The FARC freed 304 soldiers and policemen that were held to pressure the government. The Farc wanted to establish a permanent "Law of exchange" (Spanish: Ley del Canje) which would facilitate the exchange of prisoners with hostages when necessary.

== President Uribe and the United Nations ==
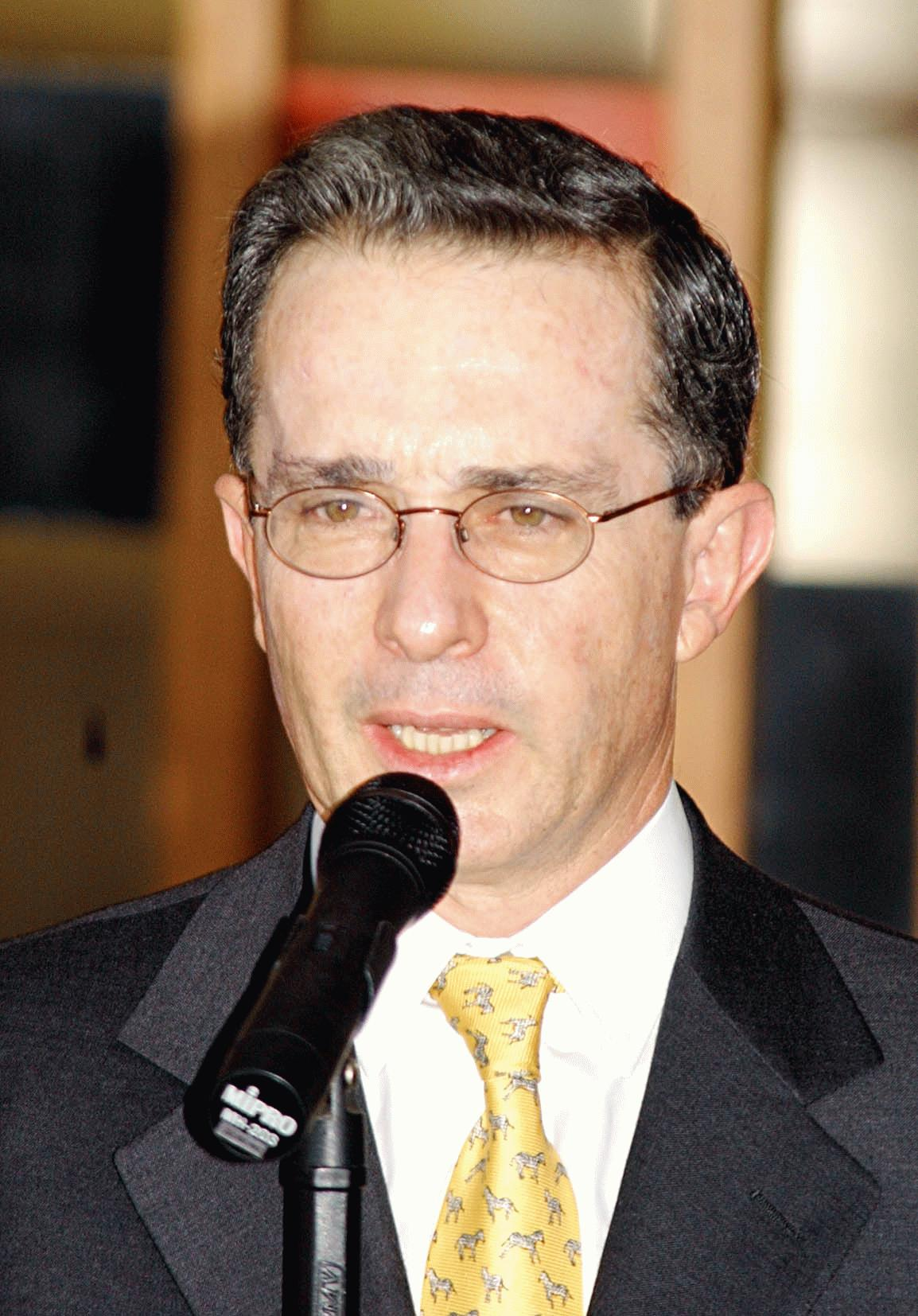
Colombian President Álvaro Uribe

On August 7, 2002, Álvaro Uribe took oath as president of Colombia. On this same date Uribe announced that he had attempted to contact United Nations Secretary-General Kofi Annan and asked him to mediate. Annan accepted but only if the two parties agreed. The negotiations through spokesmen started.

== Gustavo Moncayo ==
On June 17, 2007, Professor Gustavo Moncayo, father of a soldier held by the FARC guerrillas since 1997, began to walk as protest from his hometown Sandoná, in the department of Nariño, southern Colombia, to Bogotá, seeking to promote an agreement for the release of his son Pablo Emilio. He was accompanied by his daughter along the Pan-American Highway, stopping in every town he found on his path to have a rest and to collect signatures for a petition to President Álvaro Uribe to conduct a prisoner exchange.

== Mediation by France ==
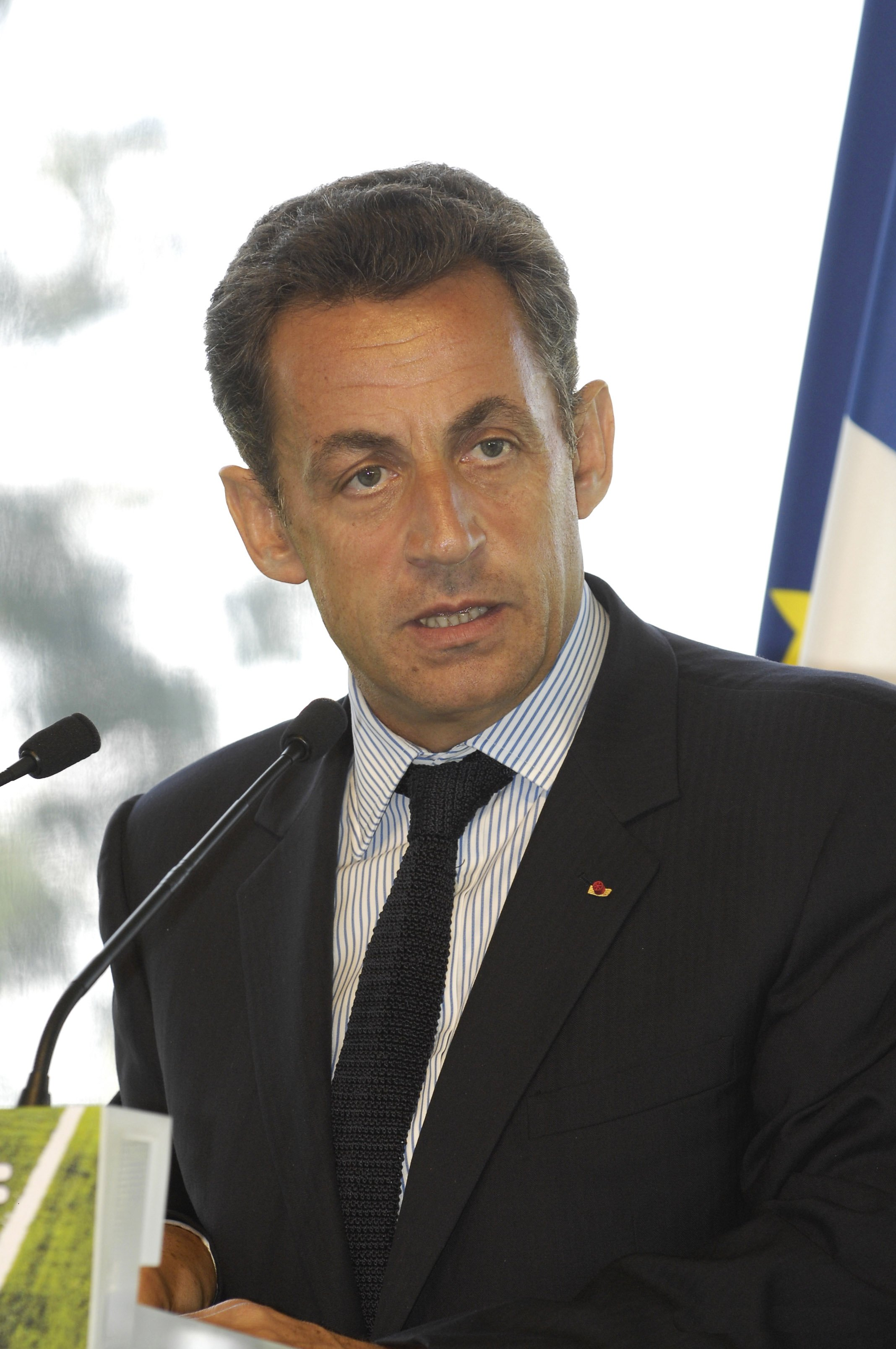
French President Nicolas Sarkozy.

While president of France, Jacques Chirac exerted political pressure on the Uribe administration to persuade him to accept the FARC demands and achieve the humanitarian exchange. Uribe conditioned the offer and suggested that the imprisoned guerrillas would be liberated in France instead of Colombia. This was later discarded by the FARC.

As a candidate Nicolas Sarkozy reassured his intentions to push for the liberation of Ingrid Betancourt and the other hostages held by the FARC.

== Mediation by Hugo Chávez ==
President of Venezuela Hugo Chávez was contacted by Colombian liberal senator Piedad Córdoba to bargain a negotiation for the "humanitarian exchange". President Uribe authorized his mediation with the condition that the meetings between him and the FARC occurred in Venezuelan territory. On November 5, 2007, Chávez announced that members of the Secretariat of the FARC (higher command) were in Venezuela.

=== Meeting with the FARC ===
On November 8, 2007, Chávez met at the Palacio de Miraflores with alias "Iván Márquez" one of the highest members of the FARC and members of its secretariat. Márquez is considered one of the most radical political leaders of the FARC. Chávez announced that the FARC wanted the demilitarization of the municipalities of Florida and Pradera in the Department of Valle del Cauca and also asked for a meeting between Chávez and alias "Manuel Marulanda Velez" leader of the FARC in the Region of Yari. The Yari is considered a historic enclave by the FARC, but after the military offensives of Plan Colombia and Plan Patriota these were pushed out from the area. The region of Yari is located within the Department of Vichada, near the border with Venezuela and Brazil. To these Chávez publicly asked Uribe for the creation of the demilitarized zone.

On November 19, 2007, President Chávez, Senator Cordoba and President Sarkozy met in Paris with most of the media expecting videos proving that the kidnapped remained alive. President Uribe meanwhile announced that he had set up a limit for President Chávez as negotiator for the humanitarian exchange until December 31, 2007. This, after Chávez proposed a meeting between "Tiro Fijo" and President Uribe. Chávez did not provide any evidence.

=== End of mediation by Hugo Chávez ===
On November 22, 2007, President Uribe decided to end the mediation by President Chávez and senator Cordoba after Chávez decided to communicate directly with the higher command of the Colombian military. Uribe, in a private conversation, had warned Chávez during the 17th Ibero-American Summit not to talk directly with members of the Colombian military without going through the chain of command and the proper diplomatic channels.

Chávez talked directly with the General of the Colombian National Army, Gen. Mario Montoya Uribe and asked him detailed information about the number of hostages in Colombia. He also asked the Colombian military to support the demilitarization of the municipalities of Pradera and Florida in the Department of Valle del Cauca. Chávez supported the creation of the demilitarized area for an eventual reunion of him with Manuel Marulanda Velez.

In a public address Chávez then told Uribe that he would be open at any time to mediate again between the government and the FARC. The mediation duties in time were returned to Colombia's High Commissioner for Peace Luis Carlos Restrepo Ramírez who thanked the mediation of President Chávez and senator Cordoba. President Sarkozy asked Uribe to find alternative channel to negotiate. The exchange of words heated up between Uribe and Chávez that led to suspension of Colombia-Venezuela relations.

== November 2007 videos ==
On November 25, 2007, a video of CNP Captain Guillermo Solórzano surfaced and was published by the Latin American news network teleSUR. The video in an interview mode was done by Colombian reporter William Parra who later gave an excerpt to teleSUR.

On November 30, 2007, the Colombian National Army captured three individuals pertaining to the FARC. The guerrillas had in their possession numerous thumb drives, videos and letters of the hostages held by FARC. The videos showed footage of Ingrid Betancourt, Vice First Sergeant Erasmo Romero, CNP Lieutenant Vianey Rodriguez Porras, CNP Private Julio César Buitrago and CNP Private Jairo Durán Puerto dated from October 23–24, 2007. Another video showed the three U.S. contractors Marc Gonsalves, Keith Stansell and Thomas Howes, as well as Army Lieutenant Juan Carlos Bermeo, Corporal José Miguel Arteaga, Sub-Intendant of the CNP Armando Castellanos, Army LT. Raimundo Malagón, Corporal William Pérez Medina, Sergeant José Ricardo Marulanda and Corporal Armando Flórez Pantoja.

There were seven letters; two from Thomas Howes, to Mariana Howes and a power of attorney letter. One letter from Mark Gonsalves to FARC leader "Mono Jojoy". Three letters from the Colombian army LT Raimundo Malagón to Efraín Malagón, Stella Malagón and Venezuelan President Hugo Chávez. And one from Ingrid Betancourt to her mother Yolanda Pulecio.

== DMZ proposal of President Uribe ==
After the negative of President Sarkozy to negotiate directly between the two parts after President Uribe's proposal to do it, he publicly addressed the FARC to free Ingrid Betancourt and the hostages, he also added that the government was going to create a fund of a US$100 million and give it to those guerrillas who freed the hostages safely. Meanwhile, the children of Ingrid Betancourt were offered by Radio France Internationale (RFI) to make live radio addresses in Spanish to their mother every Monday, Tuesday and Friday mornings. President Uribe later added to this that he was still considering a military rescue.

On December 8, 2007, President Uribe decided to allow a demilitarized zone (DMZ) in Colombia under certain conditions. That the DMZ should not be located near a densely populated area, no weapons inside the area and within a radius of 150 km^{2}. The proposal had been previously proposed by Uribe and the collaborating governments of France, Spain and Switzerland.

=== Support for proposal ===
Political parties including the main opposition party Alternative Democratic Pole (PDA) supported Uribe's idea of allowing the demilitarization.

During the inauguration of Cristina Fernández de Kirchner as President of Argentina most of the Latin American leaders present, including President Uribe, supported the formation of a common bloc to free the hostages in Colombia. These after President Kirchner met with Ingrid Betancourt's mother Yolanda Pulecio and French President Sarkozy had called for the support his idea of helping to free the hostages in Colombia.

Fernández de Kirchner said "from now on we will collaborate in everything we can for the freedom of Ingrid Betancourt". President of Chile Michelle Bachelet said "what most worries her is the "deteriorated and dramatic" image of Ingrid Betancourt" and moved to support the call for the FARC to free the hostages. President of Ecuador Rafael Correa sent a message of solidarity to all the families of the hostages. He also mentioned that Colombia needed a solution for its armed conflict and said "the first step is to call for the inconditional release of all hostages, including Betancourt".

== Unilateral liberation of six hostages ==
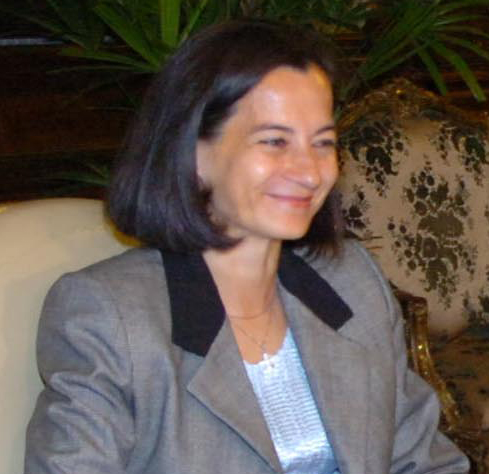
Clara Rojas

On December 18, 2007, the FARC released a communique in which they reaffirmed their will to the municipalities of Florida and Pradera demilitarized for 45 days in order to exchange the hostages for prisoners. They also said that they would free three hostages Clara Rojas and her born in captivity son Emmanuel and former congresswoman Consuelo González de Perdomo unilaterally. The FARC disagreed with President Uribe on creating a "Meeting area" and called the High Commissioner for Peace a liar. The FARC thanked publicly President Hugo Chávez for his work as facilitator while it lasted and called the Colombian government's decision to end Chávez' negotiation as "barbaric diplomacy". The Colombian government called to be prudent to FARC remarks.

=== Proposal of President Chávez ===
President Chávez proposed a humanitarian mission to rescue Clara Rojas, her son Emmanuel and Consuelo González in Colombia with the permission of the Colombian government. Chávez' plan was supported by the governments of Argentina, Brazil, France, Ecuador and Bolivia, as well as the Red Cross which will also participate of the operation. The mission consisted on flying Venezuelan aircraft labeled with the Red Cross insignia and into Colombia to an airport in the town of Villacicencio. Then resupply and from there reach the secret rescue point set up by the FARC. On December 26, 2007, the Colombian government through the Minister of Foreign Affairs approved the mission.

On January 10, 2008, former vice presidential candidate Clara Rojas and former congresswoman Consuelo Gonzalez were freed after six years in captivity. It was also revealed that Emmanuel was already in a foster home, not with the FARC.

On January 31, 2008, the FARC announced that they would release three civilian hostages Luis Eladio Perez Bonilla, Gloria Polanco, and Orlando Beltran Cuellar to Venezuelan President Hugo Chávez as a humanitarian gesture. All of them were kidnapped in 2001. On February 27, 2008, the three hostages and Jorge Gechem Turbay (who was added to the list due to his poor health) were released by FARC. With the authorization of the Colombian government and the participation of the International Red Cross, a Venezuelan helicopter transported them to Caracas from San Jose del Guaviare.
