= Gabriel Betancourt =

Colombian politician (1918–2002)

Minister of National Education
- In office August 7, 1966 – September 2, 1968
- President: Carlos Lleras Restrepo
- Preceded by: Daniel Arango Jaramillo
- Succeeded by: Octavio Arizmendi Posada
- In office August 26, 1955 – September 19, 1956
- President: Gustavo Rojas Pinilla
- Preceded by: Aurelio Caicedo Ayerbe
- Succeeded by: Josefina Valencia Muñoz

Personal details
- Born: Gabriel Betancourt Mejía; April 27, 1918 Medellín, Antioquia, Colombia
- Died: March 23, 2002 (aged 83) Bogotá, D.C., Colombia
- Spouse: Yolanda Pulecio Vélez (1959-1980)
- Children: Astrid Betancourt; Ingrid Betancourt
- Occupation: Economist

Gabriel Betancourt Mejía (April 27, 1918, in Medellín – March 23, 2002, in Bogotá) was a Colombian economist and diplomat who served as Colombia's Minister of National Education in two occasions, and Permanent Delegate to UNESCO.

== Early life ==
Gabriel Betancourt was born in Medellín on April 27, 1918, to Pedro Nolasco Adriano Betancur Toro and Mariana Mejía Arango as the youngest of 9 children.

Betancourt was a member of the government of president Gustavo Rojas Pinilla. He later became assistant director of the United Nations Educational, Scientific, and Cultural Organization (UNESCO). He was also head of the education commission of the Alliance for Progress in Washington, D.C., under John F. Kennedy.

== Personal life ==
Gabriel Betancourt was the father of the politician and former FARC hostage Íngrid Betancourt. Gabriel Betancourt divorced his wife Yolanda Pulecio in 1980 and was granted custody of his daughters. Gabriel Betancourt died of heart and respiratory trouble a month after Íngrid's kidnapping, without seeing his daughter again.
