= Clara Rojas =

Colombian vice presidential candidate

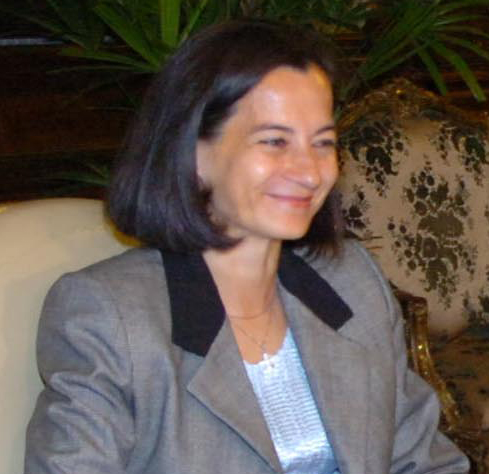
- Clara Rojas
- Born: Clara Leticia Rojas González; December 20, 1964; Bogotá, Colombia
- Education: Our Lady of the Rosary University
- Occupation: Lawyer
- Known for: Colombian vice presidential candidate, kidnapping survivor.
- Children: Emmanuel Rojas
- Parent: Clara Leticia González

Clara Leticia Rojas González (born December 20, 1964) is a Colombian lawyer, university lecturer, and campaign manager for former senator and presidential candidate Ingrid Betancourt. She was kidnapped along with Betancourt by the FARC guerrilla group near San Vicente del Caguán on February 23, 2002, while Betancourt was campaigning for the presidency. After the kidnapping, Rojas was named as Betancourt's vice-presidential candidate.

In 2006, it was revealed that Rojas had given birth to a boy named Emmanuel while in captivity. The father is a FARC guerrilla.

Rojas had last been seen publicly in a video released by the guerrilla group in 2003. However, on January 10, 2008, Rojas and former congresswoman Consuelo González were freed after six years in captivity. Betancourt was rescued on July 2, 2008.

== Operation Emmanuel ==
On December 27, 2007, the FARC guerrilla group was said to be planning the imminent release of Rojas, together with her son and congresswoman Consuelo González, in a one-sided prisoner release negotiated by Venezuelan president Hugo Chávez.

Chavez planned their release in an operation dubbed Operation Emmanuel, using Venezuelan aircraft and with the support of the Red Cross.

== Delay ==
The FARC delayed the release of the hostages because the child, Emmanuel, was missing. According to reports, the FARC had placed the child in custody of a peasant family, and he could not be found in time for the scheduled hostage release. In the meantime, the Colombian government learned that a child fitting Emmanuel's description was in the custody of the Colombian Institute for Family Welfare (ICBF) on December 31, 2007. On January 2, 2008, the government called the FARC's bluff and verified that the child was Emmanuel. Subsequently, on January 4, according to the Colombian government, the child was subjected to a mitochondrial DNA test. According to the Institute of Legal Medicine of Colombia, the test verified that he is in fact Clara Rojas' son. FARC subsequently confirmed this. Emmanuel had become ill as a baby, and Rojas had allowed her son to be taken to a doctor for care on the condition that he would be returned to her. Instead, he was placed into the care of a peasant who did not know to whom the child belonged.

=== Release ===
After being temporarily suspended, Operation Emmanuel resumed, and on January 10, 2008, a humanitarian commission headed by the International Committee of the Red Cross flew in two Venezuelan helicopters to a location in Colombia that FARC had designated the previous day. Rojas and González were then released to the care of the commission. On January 13, 2008, Rojas was reunited with Emmanuel; it was the first time she had seen her son after being parted from him for more than two years.

== Political career ==
Rojas was a candidate for vice president at one point. After her release from captivity, she became the director of "Free Country", a Bogota organization that works with the relatives of hostages. In March 2014, she was elected to the Columbian Congress.

== Memoir ==
Rojas' ordeal is described in the book Captive (2010).

== See also ==
- Colombian armed conflict
- Humanitarian exchange
- Ingrid Betancourt
- List of solved missing person cases (2000s)
- Operation Emmanuel
