= Operation Emmanuel =

South American rescue operation

Operation Emmanuel (Spanish: Operación Emmanuel) was a humanitarian operation that rescued politician Clara Rojas, her son Emmanuel (born in captivity), and former senator Consuelo González from the Revolutionary Armed Forces of Colombia (FARC) in Colombia. The operation was proposed and set up by Venezuelan President Hugo Chávez, with the permission of the Colombian government of Álvaro Uribe. Chávez's plan was supported by the governments of Argentina, Bolivia, Brazil, Ecuador, and France, as well as the Red Cross, which also participated in the operation. Venezuelan aircraft were flown to an airport in the Colombian town of Villavicencio, were resupplied, and from there flew to the secret rescue point set up by the FARC. On December 26, 2007, through the Minister of Foreign Affairs, the Colombian government approved the mission, only requesting that the aircraft used for the operations were labelled with Red Cross insignias.

== Background ==
Colombian politician and then-senator Consuelo González was kidnapped by the FARC on September 10, 2001. Her captors held her to pressure a possible "humanitarian exchange" between government-held guerrilla prisoners for FARC-held hostages. In 2002, former vice presidential candidate Clara Rojas was kidnapped along with presidential candidate Ingrid Betancourt, and were also held by the FARC.

== Mission ==
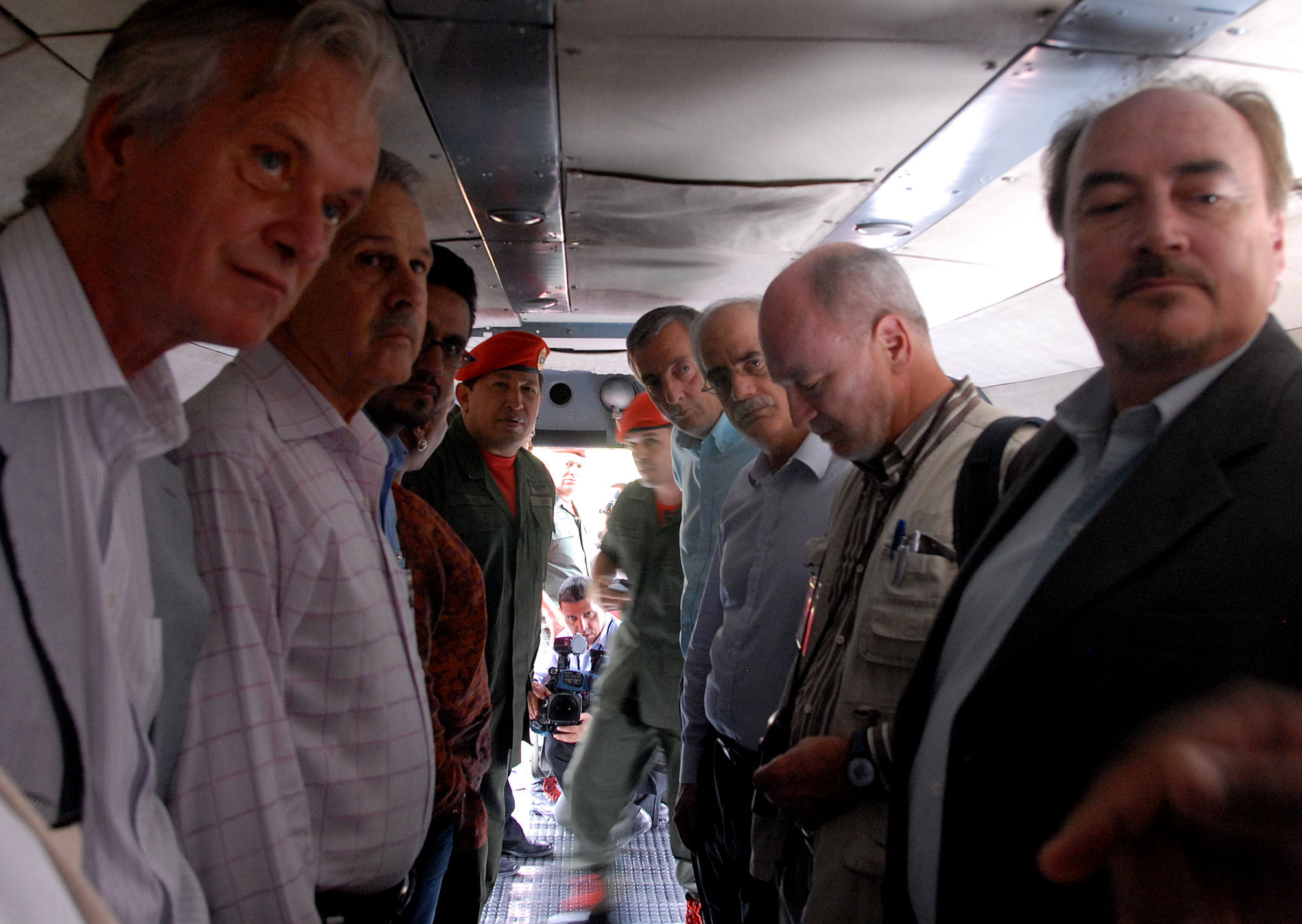
Hugo Chavez with international guarantors of Operation Emmanuel.

Venezuelan president Hugo Chávez said the plan consisted of three phases. The first phase comprised sending two Mil Mi-17 helicopters to Colombia carrying five International Red Cross Committee delegates. Both helicopters were to be equipped with medical aid appropriate for the humanitarian mission and in accordance with International Red Cross standards. Chávez personally inspected the two helicopters in Santo Domingo before departing along with former president of Argentina Néstor Kirchner, who was also invited to supervise the operations. Besides the two Mi-17 helicopters, two Bell 412 helicopters and three French-made executive Falcon 200 jets were used for support tasks.

Along with the ICRC delegates were representatives from Argentina, Bolivia, Brazil, Colombia, Cuba, France, and Switzerland. Family members of the three hostages travelled from Colombia to Caracas to wait for the end of the operation, set to conclude in Caracas with President Chávez receiving the hostages, as previously petitioned by the FARC as a condition.

=== Phase I ===
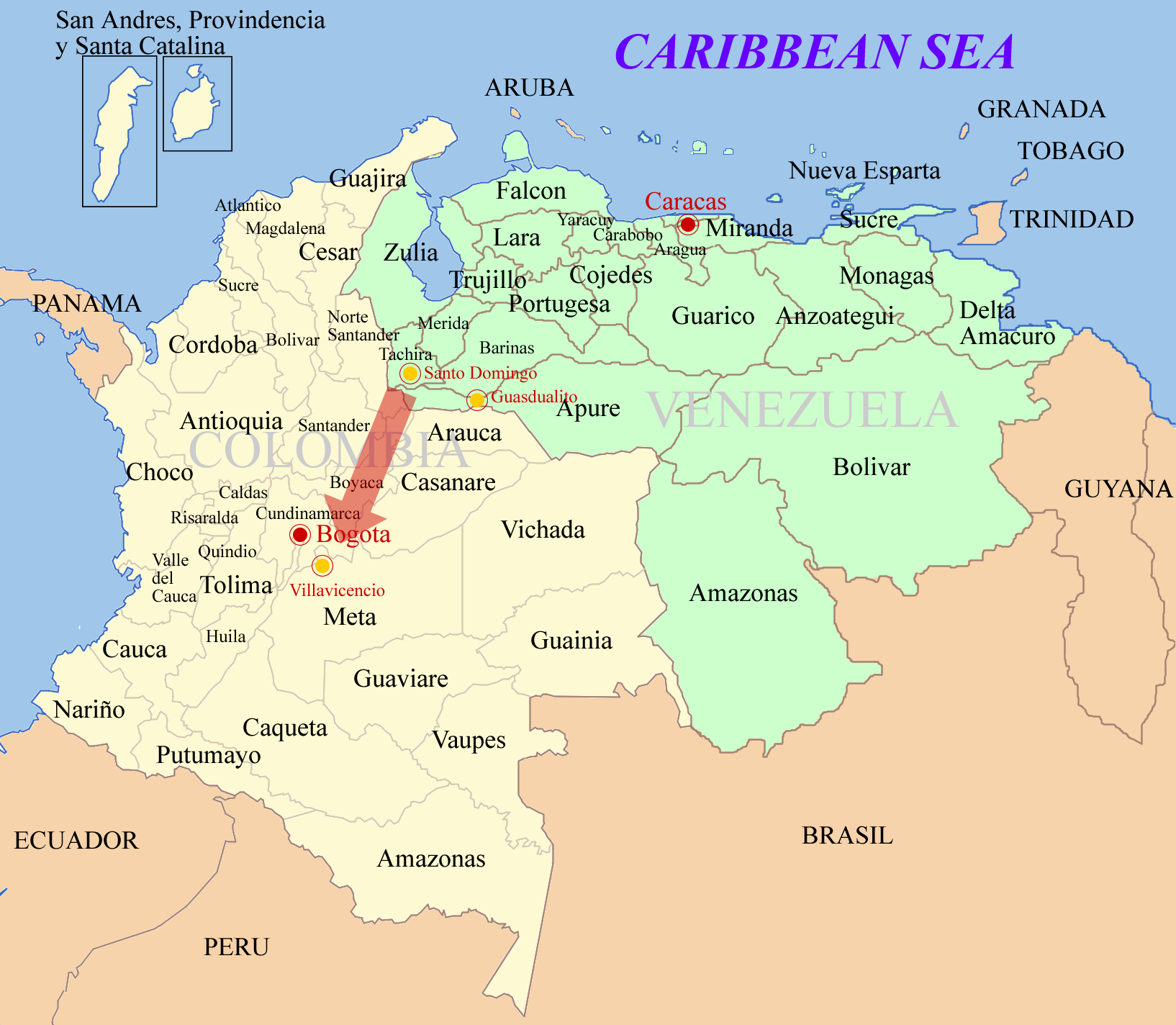
Phase I

During the first phase, two Russian-made MI-17 helicopters from the Venezuelan Military Search and Rescue Team flew into Colombia on December 27, 2007 at 1530 hours, with the permission of the President of Colombia and with the International Red Cross (IRC) insignia for a humanitarian mission. The helicopters flew more than two hours from the Venezuelan town of Santo Domingo in the State of Táchira to the Colombian city of Villavicencio, capital of the Department of Meta, arriving at approximately 1730 hours.

Colombia's High Commissioner for Peace, Luis Carlos Restrepo Ramírez, was scheduled to receive the IRC delegates and the Vice Chancellor for Latin America and the Caribbean, Rodolfo Sanz, in Villavicencio to coordinate the rescue operation.

At the end of the first phase Colombian President Alvaro Uribe said: “[I'm] thinking about the freedom of Emmanuel, the child who was conceived by a kidnapped mother, who has been raised kidnapped, a condition worse than the conditions seen in enslaved societies […]”

=== Phase II ===
On December 31, Hugo Chávez read a letter from FARC wherein the group claimed that the hostage release had been delayed because of Colombian military operations. However, Colombian President Álvaro Uribe indicated that FARC had not freed the three hostages because Emmanuel appeared not to be in their hands any longer.

Colombian authorities added that a boy matching Emmanuel's description had been taken to a hospital in San José del Guaviare in June 2005. The child was in poor condition: one of his arms was injured, he had severe malnutrition, and he had diseases that are commonly suffered in the jungle. Having been evidently mistreated, the boy was later sent to a foster home in Bogotá, and DNA tests were conducted to confirm his identity.

On January 4, the results of a mitochondrial DNA test, comparing the child's DNA with that of his potential grandmother Clara de Rojas, were revealed by the Colombian government. It was reported that there was a very high probability that the boy was indeed a Rojas family member. A further analysis was carried out in a Santiago de Compostela institute in order to verify the results.

Venezuelan Foreign Minister Nicolás Maduro questioned the results, stating that Colombia did not allow Venezuelan specialists to conduct their own tests and had created a "cloak of doubt".

On January 4, the FARC released a communique in which they admitted that Emmanuel had been taken to Bogotá and "left in the care of honest persons" for safety reasons, until a humanitarian exchange could take place. The group accused President Uribe of "kidnapping" the child in order to sabotage his liberation.

The suspended Operation Emmanuel resumed and, on January 10, 2008, a humanitarian commission, headed by the International Committee of the Red Cross, flew in two Venezuelan helicopters to a location in Colombia that FARC had designated the previous day. Rojas and Gonzalez were then released to the care of the commission. The release received ample coverage by Venezuelan government media, which was allowed to take cameramen in the helicopters, in what was to become a carefully crafted media showcase.

On January 13, 2008, Rojas was reunited with Emmanuel. It was the first time she had seen her son in over two years.

== See also ==
- 2008 Andean diplomatic crisis
- Colombia-Venezuela relations
- Opération 14 juillet
- Operation Jaque
