= Yolanda Pulecio =

Colombian beauty queen and politician

Yolanda Pulecio Vélez

Senator of Colombia
- In office July 20, 1990 – 1991

Personal details
- Born: December 31, 1939 (age 86) Bogotá, DC, Colombia
- Party: Liberal
- Spouse(s): Gabriel Betancourt Mejía (m. 1959 d. 1980)
- Children: Ingrid Betancourt Pulecio; Astrid Betancourt Pulecio
- Occupation: Advocate, politician

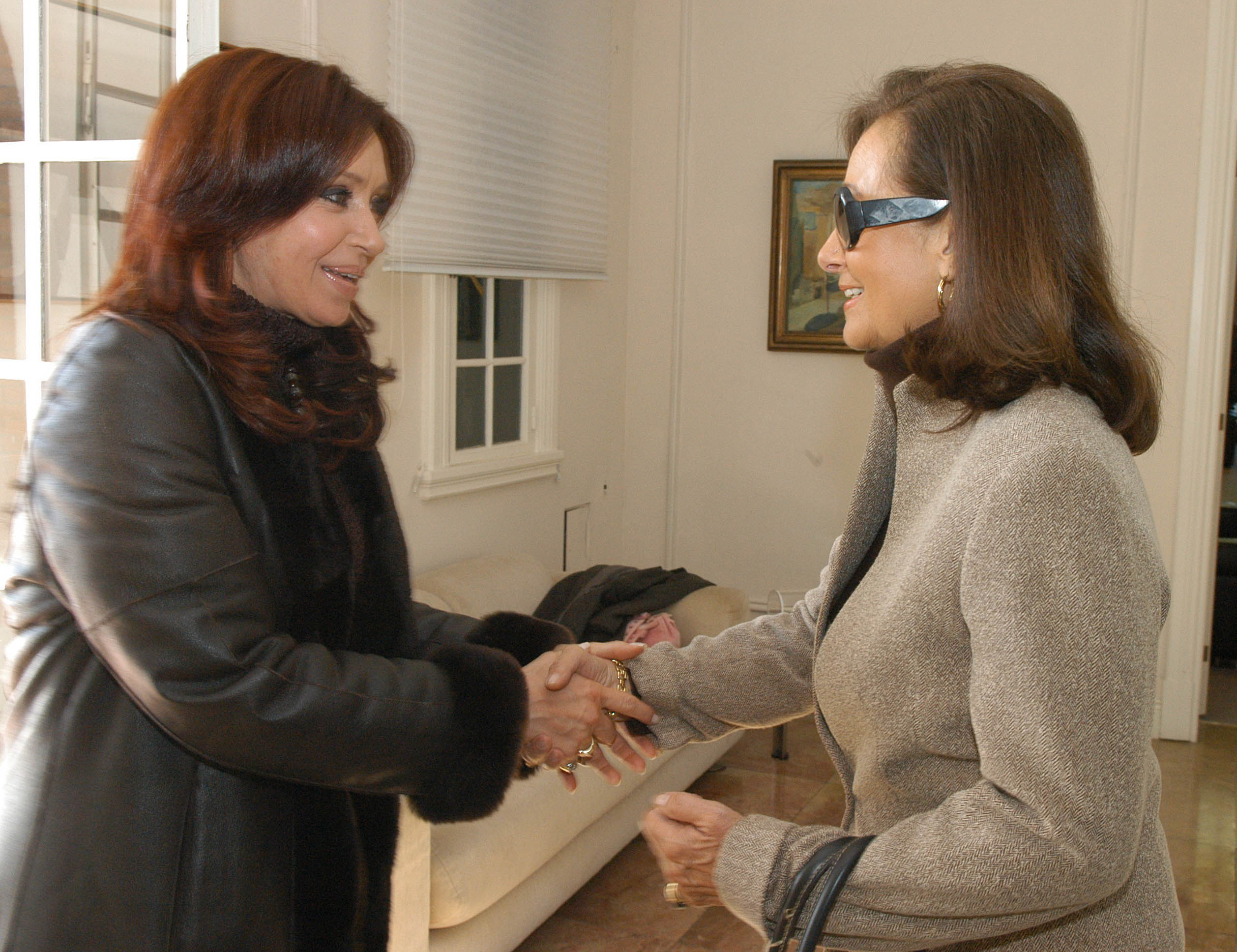
Pulecio (right) with Cristina Fernández de Kirchner

Yolanda Pulecio Vélez, also known as "Mamá Yolanda" (born December 31, 1939), is a Colombian former beauty queen turned politician, former member of the Congress of Colombia.

Of Italian origins, Pulecio married former minister of finance and diplomat Gabriel Betancourt. Pulecio is the mother of Astrid Betancourt and Colombian politician Ingrid Betancourt who spent six and a half years in captivity after being kidnapped by the Revolutionary Armed Forces of Colombia until July 2 when she was rescued by the Colombian Armed Forces in Operation Jaque, 2008.

== Miss Colombia ==
In 1955 Pulecio participated in the Miss Colombia pageant in representation of the Department of Cundinamarca. She then founded the Hogares Infantiles de Bogotá (Bogotá Children's Shelter), a foundation to help the poor children of Bogotá which has been functioning since 1958.

== Life between France and Colombia ==
In 1961, her husband Gabriel Betancourt, whom she had married in 1959, was appointed as Adjutant Director of the UNESCO of Colombia in France. The family went to live in Neuilly-sur-Seine, a suburb of Paris. They lived in France for 5 years until 1966.

In 1966 then-President of Colombia Carlos Lleras appointed her husband as Minister of Education and returned to Colombia. Back in Colombia, Pulecio was appointed by the then-Mayor of Bogotá, Virgilio Barco, as Director of the Social Welfare Department of Bogotá. In 1969 her husband Gabriel was appointed as Ambassador of Colombia to the UNESCO and the family returned to live in Paris, France. Their daughters, Astrid and Íngrid, studied at the Institut de l'Assomption, as well as a boarding school in England.

== Divorce and return to Colombia ==
Pulecio felt nostalgia for the children of her foundation and decided to return to Colombia. In Colombia she developed an interest to participate in politics and she and her husband Gabriel Betancourt divorced. She was widely criticized in Colombia for this. Her daughter Ingrid later wrote about this: "She separated from her husband to recover her active role in society, but she found herself judged, in defamation, criticized and condemned by the Colombian society of the time."

== Kidnapping of Ingrid ==
Her daughter Ingrid was kidnapped on the road to San Vicente. Since the kidnapping of her daughter Ingrid by the violent FARC guerrilla group while campaigning for the presidency of Colombia, Pulecio has been advocating for her release and the hundreds of others held as hostages.

Pulecio has criticized both presidents Andrés Pastrana and Álvaro Uribe for not doing enough for the release of the hostages, as well as not collaborating on achieving a possible humanitarian exchange of prisoners for hostages between the government and the FARC guerrilla. When senator of Colombia Piedad Cordoba and President of Venezuela Hugo Chávez were named as facilitators by the government of Álvaro Uribe, Pulecio supported their initiatives alleging that they had achieved in a few months what had not been done in 5 years of the kidnapping of her daughter. Regardless, they were not able to secure her release.

After the rescue of her daughter in "Operación Jaque" (Operation Jaque), carried out by the Colombian army via an order of President Álvaro Uribe with the assistance of military intelligence operatives of the United States, Pulecio left Colombia and moved to France. She has received some criticism from several Colombian organizations for "forgetting the rest of the kidnapped people once Ingrid was rescued". Two years later, in July 2010, her daughter Ingrid Betancourt filed suit against the Republic of Colombia for "economic hardship and moral damage" during the time she was kidnapped. After great public disapproval and vocal opposition by the government, Ingrid Betancourt then withdrew her lawsuit. The role her mother Yolanda Pulecio played in this, if any, is unclear.

== See also ==
- Humanitarian exchange
