= Juan Carlos Lecompte =

Colombian author

Juan Carlos Lecompte Pérez is a Colombian author who was married to Ingrid Betancourt, a politician kidnapped by the Revolutionary Armed Forces of Colombia (FARC). After her public release in Operation Jaque they divorced. In January 2010 he published a book about their break-up, it is called "Ingrid et moi".
