= Lycée Français de Medellin =

International school in Colombia

Lycée Français de Medellin (Spanish: Liceo Francés de Medellín) is a French international school in the Medellín metropolitan area in Colombia. in the Loma of Escobero in Envigado, Antioquia.

In 2013, at one of the headquarters of the French Alliance in Medellin, the gestation of the institution began with the accompaniment of the French government and a special business group, The project was well received as it was a widely recognised educational system at international level. For the year 2014 it was presented to the community and that same year began the construction of the first stage; and in 2015 we received our first students.

We are a private educational institution, which accompanies with excellence, determination and discipline, the life project of the new generations with a unique educational model in the city of Medellín.

It serves levels preschool through senior high school.
