= Íngrid Betancourt =

Colombian politician and anti-corruption activist

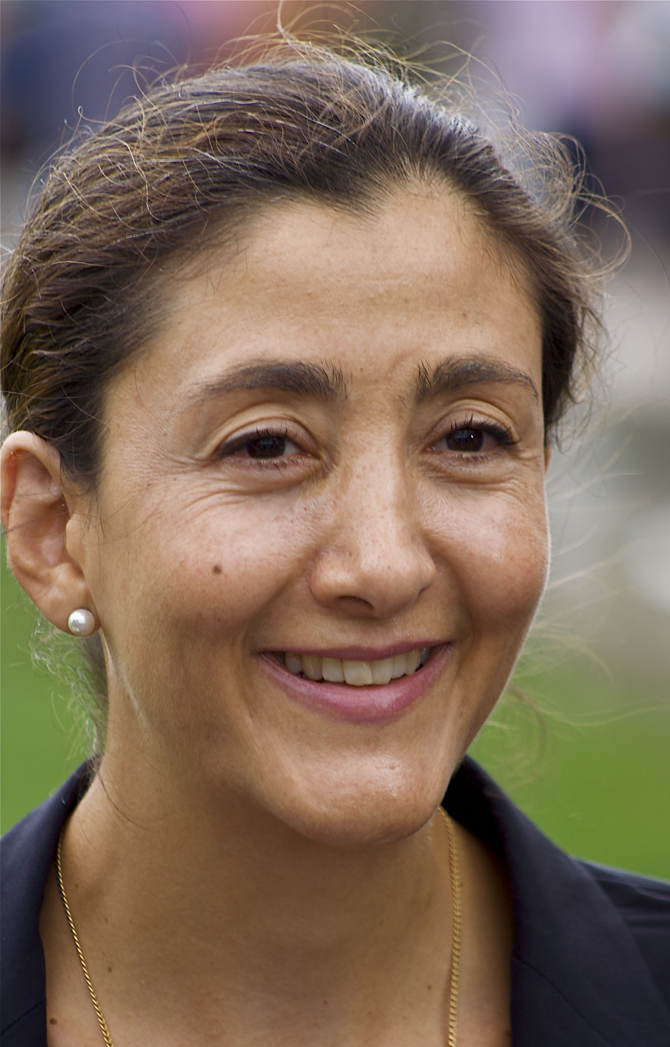
- Betancourt in 2008

Senator of Colombia
- In office 20 July 1998 – 21 May 2001

Member of the Chamber of Representatives
- In office 20 July 1994 – 20 July 1998
- Constituency: Capital District

Personal details
- Born: Íngrid Betancourt Pulecio; 25 December 1961 (age 64) Bogotá, Colombia
- Party: Oxygen Green Party
- Spouses: Fabrice Delloye (m. 1983; div. 1990) Juan Carlos Lecompte (m. 1997; div. 2011)
- Children: 2
- Education: Sciences Po (BA); Harris Manchester College, Oxford (DPhil)

Íngrid Betancourt Pulecio (Spanish pronunciation: [ˈiŋɡɾið βetaŋˈkuɾ]; born 25 December 1961) is a Colombian-French politician, former senator, and anti-corruption activist. She gained international prominence after being kidnapped by the Revolutionary Armed Forces of Colombia (FARC) in 2002 while campaigning for the Colombian presidency as a Green candidate. She was rescued in 2008 during Operation Jaque, a military operation conducted by Colombian security forces.

Born in Bogotá, Betancourt is the daughter of Gabriel Betancourt, a former Colombian Minister of Education and UNESCO official, and Yolanda Pulecio, a former beauty queen and congresswoman. She was educated in France and England, attending Sciences Po in Paris, and later earned a Doctor of Philosophy in Theology from Harris Manchester College, Oxford, in 2023.

Betancourt began her political career in the 1990s, serving in the Colombian Chamber of Representatives from 1994 to 1998 and in the Senate from 1998 to 2001. She founded the Oxygen Green Party and was known for her strong stance against political corruption.

On 23 February 2002, Betancourt and her campaign manager, Clara Rojas, were kidnapped by FARC guerrillas near San Vicente del Caguán. They were held captive in the Colombian jungle for over six years. During her captivity, Betancourt became an international symbol of resistance against political violence, particularly in France, where she also holds citizenship through her first marriage to French diplomat Fabrice Delloye.

Betancourt was rescued on 2 July 2008 during Operation Jaque, along with 14 other hostages, including three American contractors and 11 Colombian military personnel. The operation was widely celebrated and brought significant political capital to the Colombian government.

Following her release, Betancourt received several international honors, including France's Légion d'honneur and Spain's Prince of Asturias Award for Concord. Accounts of her behavior during captivity varied; some fellow hostages described her as controlling, while others praised her courage and compassion.

In January 2022, Betancourt announced her candidacy for the Colombian presidential election but withdrew from the race in May 2022.

== Biography ==
Betancourt was born in Bogotá, Colombia. Her mother, Yolanda Pulecio, a former beauty queen famous for sheltering abandoned children, served in Congress, representing poor southern neighborhoods of Bogotá. Betancourt's father, Gabriel Betancourt, was a minister of Education in both liberal and conservative governments (those of President Rojas Pinilla and President Lleras Restrepo), the assistant director of the United Nations Educational, Scientific, and Cultural Organization (UNESCO), then ambassador of Colombia to UNESCO in Paris, and head of the education commission of the Alliance for Progress in Washington, D.C. under John F. Kennedy. Betancourt's mother Yolanda is of Italian descent.

After attending private school in France, a boarding school in England, and the Liceo Francés in Bogotá, Betancourt attended the Institut d'Études Politiques de Paris (commonly known as Sciences Po). In 2023, she was awarded a DPhil in Theology by the University of Oxford for her thesis entitled The Concept of the Non-Person in Gustavo Gutiérrez's Writings. She is current a research fellow at Harris Manchester College, Oxford.

Betancourt married French citizen Fabrice Delloye in 1983, and they had two children, Mélanie (born 1985) and Lorenzo (born 1988). Through her marriage she became a French citizen. Her husband served in the French diplomatic corps, and the couple lived in multiple countries, including Ecuador, the Seychelles, and the United States of America.

In the mid-1990s, Betancourt and Delloye divorced. Betancourt returned to Colombia and became advisor to the Minister of Finance and later to the Minister of Foreign Trade. In 1994, she was elected to the House of Representatives on an anticorruption ticket, and in 1998 she entered the Colombian Senate. Her children, Melanie and Lorenzo, moved to New Zealand to live with their father due to death threats stemming from Betancourt's political activities.

Betancourt married Colombian advertising executive Juan Carlos Lecompte in 1997. Their marriage ended soon after her 2008 rescue.

== Political career ==
In 1989, Luis Carlos Galán, a candidate for the Colombian presidency running on an anti-drug-trafficking platform, was assassinated. Betancourt's mother was a supporter of Galán, and she was standing immediately behind him when he was shot dead. This event motivated Betancourt to return to Colombia in 1989. From 1990 onward, Betancourt worked at the Ministry of Finance and later at the Ministry of Foreign Trade, from which she later resigned to enter politics. Her first campaign distributed condoms, with the motto that people should protect themselves against corruption as they do against HIV.

=== Election to the Chamber of Representatives, 1994 ===
Betancourt was elected to the Chamber of Representatives in 1994, against all odds. During her term, she criticized the administration of President Ernesto Samper, who was accused of corruption in the 8000 Process scandal after accepting money from the Cali drug cartel for his electoral campaign. In 1997, Betancourt launched a political party, the Partido Verde Oxigeno (Green Oxygen Party), as an alternative to the traditional conservative and liberal parties.

=== Elected Senator of Colombia, 1998 ===
Betancourt ran for senator in the 1998 election, and the total number of votes she received was the largest of any candidate in a senate election. During her time in elected office, death threats caused her to send her children to New Zealand, where they would live with their father.

That same year, the presidential election was ultimately won by Andrés Pastrana. Pastrana persuaded Betancourt to endorse him, and she campaigned for him under the agreement of an anticorruption electoral reform to be adopted during his presidential term. The electoral reform was aborted due to strong pressures from the traditional parties and lack of commitment from the government. Betancourt withdrew her support of the government and joined the opposition forces.

=== Presidential candidate, 2002 ===
Betancourt launched her presidential campaign on 20 May 2001, while standing next to a statue of Simón Bolívar in Bogotá. She then began a campaign bus trip around the country to attend local community meetings.

As part of her campaign for the presidency in 2002, Betancourt decided to visit the town of San Vicente del Caguán, in the demilitarized zone (DMZ), to support its mayor, a member of the Green Oxygen party. The peace process with the FARC had collapsed, the DMZ had been put to an end, and Pastrana had launched "Operacion Tanatos" to reclaim the area. At the time Betancourt decided to go, the Colombian Army had been deployed in the area in an attempt to evict the FARC guerillas. President Pastrana had given them 48 hours to leave the territory, and the deadline had expired. That same day President Pastrana attended a press conference in San Vicente del Caguan, in order to prove with his presence that the FARC had fled and that the military operation was a success. At the same time, the government ordered Betancourt's bodyguards to abandon the mission of escorting her to San Vicente del Caguan.

Nonetheless, Betancourt was determined to go. Despite the army's refusal to airlift her into San Vicente, she decided to drive and was given a government vehicle. The government later claimed that Betancourt had signed a document to release the government from any responsibility for what could happen to her. Clara Rojas, Adair Lamprea, and Betancourt have denied the existence of such a document. The document has never been produced by any Colombian official.

The peace talks reached an impasse after more than three years of negotiations. From the beginning, the FARC would not agree to a truce for the duration of the negotiations, nor would they agree that the peace talks be overseen by different representatives of the international community. Though the DMZ was purported to be a "laboratory for peace", in practice the FARC continued its kidnapping activities, military attacks, purchasing of weapons, and even building of roads and airstrips for trafficking narcotics. Critics considered the DMZ to have been turned into a safe haven in which the FARC imposed its will as law, launching military attacks and acts of terrorism outside the DMZ before withdrawing back to it, in order to avoid direct confrontation with government armed forces. Also during this time, hundreds of civilians were kidnapped throughout different cities and rural areas of the country. They were then transported back to the DMZ, where they were kept in cages, many of them having been kidnapped for economic extortion, others for "political reasons". By the end of 2001, the Colombian government and public opinion (according to different polls) were growing impatient and discouraged regarding the situation.

In February 2002, a turboprop plane flying from Florencia to Bogotá—a distance of some 1,000 km (620 mi)—was hijacked in midair by FARC members and forced to land on a highway strip near the city of Neiva, and then a member of the Colombian Congress was kidnapped. As a consequence, President Andrés Pastrana canceled the talks with the FARC and revoked the DMZ, arguing that the FARC had betrayed the terms of the negotiation and had used the DMZ to grow stronger in military and logistical capabilities. In a televised statement, the president expressed the government's intention of retaking the DMZ, advising that the military operation would begin at midnight. He also urged the FARC to respect the lives and the livelihood of those civilians still present in the DMZ.

== Autobiography ==
After her experience in the impeachment process against Colombian President E. Samper, Betancourt published her memoirs, in French, in March 2001, under the title La rage au cœur. The book generated intense media coverage in France, where it was the number one best seller for four weeks and a best seller for another nine. It has since appeared in Spanish as La rabia en el corazón and in English as Until Death Do Us Part: My Struggle to Reclaim Colombia (2002).

== Kidnapping ==
Most candidates for political office visited the former DMZ. When Betancourt announced her trip, the government confirmed that a security escort would accompany her from Florencia to San Vicente del Caguan. When she landed at Florencia's airport, she received an offer to be transported to San Vicente del Caguan in a military helicopter. This offer was later retracted, and at the same time her bodyguards received the order to cancel their mission. President Pastrana and other officials explained they had turned down the helicopter ride offer, arguing that this meant rendering public resources to Betancourt's private political interests. Betancourt stated that the government had, under constitutional provisions, the obligation of protecting any Colombian running for presidency, which included her.

When denied transport aboard a military helicopter that was heading to the DMZ, Betancourt revisited the original plan to travel there via ground transport, together with Clara Rojas, her campaign manager who was later named running-mate for the 2002 election, and a handful of political aides. On 23 February 2002, Betancourt was stopped at the last military checkpoint before going into the former DMZ. Military officers have reported they insisted on stopping her car, and that Betancourt dismissed their warnings and continued her journey. These allegations contradict the testimony of Adair Lamprea, who was driving the car. He insists traffic was normal and the military officers at the checkpoint asked for their ID but did not try to stop them. This is corroborated by the fact that on the FARC roadblock where Betancourt was kidnapped, other vehicles were stopped, including a Red Cross four-wheel-drive car and a bus, which comprised normal traffic. According to Betancourt's kidnapper, Nolberto Uni Vega (after his capture), Betancourt ended up at a FARC checkpoint, where she was kidnapped. Her kidnapping was not planned beforehand, said the rebel. Despite her abduction, Betancourt still appeared on the ballot for the presidential elections; her husband promised to continue her campaign. She received less than 1% of the votes.

Betancourt stated in an NPR interview that the government did offer to fly her but later reneged and took away her flight and then took away her bodyguards. She also stated she was never warned that it would be dangerous to travel by road, that checkpoints let her through with no warning or attempt to stop her, and that the government encouraged her to travel by road.

=== Uribe's initial policy ===
Ever since the days of the Pastrana negotiations, when a limited exchange took place, the FARC have demanded the formalization of a mechanism for prisoner exchange. The mechanism would involve the release of what the FARC terms its "political hostages" in exchange for most jailed guerrillas, numbering about 500. For the FARC, most of its other hostages, those held for extortion purposes and which would number at least a thousand, would not be considered subject to such an exchange.

The newly elected Uribe administration initially ruled out any negotiation with the group that would not include a ceasefire, and instead pushed for rescue operations, many of which have traditionally been successful when carried out by the police's GAULA anti-kidnapping group in urban settings, but not in the mountains and jungles where the FARC keeps most prisoners, according to official statistics and mainstream news reports.

Relatives of Betancourt and of most of FARC's hostages strongly rejected any potential rescue operations, especially after the death of the governor of the Antioquia department, Guillermo Gaviria, his peace advisor and several soldiers, kidnapped by the FARC during a peace march in 2003. The governor and the others were shot at close range by the FARC in May 2003 when the government launched an army rescue mission into the jungle which failed as the guerrillas learned of the troops' presence in the area.

=== Negotiations ===
==== 2002 ====
A day after Betancourt's kidnapping several non-governmental organizations (NGO) under the lead of Armand Burguet were organized in the European Union and around the world to establish an association or committee for the liberation of Ingrid Betancourt. The committee initially consisted of some 280 activists in 39 countries.

One month after her kidnapping, her father Gabriel died of heart and respiratory trouble.

==== 2003 ====
In July 2003 Opération 14 juillet was launched, which both failed to liberate Betancourt and caused a scandal for the French government. A video of Betancourt was released by FARC in August 2003.

==== 2004 ====
In August 2004, after several false-starts and in the face of mounting pressure from relatives, former Liberal presidents Alfonso López Michelsen and Ernesto Samper (who was accused in the 'Proceso 8000' for financing his presidential campaign with drug funds) came out in favor of a humanitarian exchange. The Uribe government, seeming to have gradually relaxed its position, announced that it had given the FARC a formal proposal on 23 July, in which it offered to free 50 to 60 jailed rebels in exchange for the political and military hostages held by the FARC group (not including economic hostages, as the government had earlier demanded).

The government would make the first move, releasing insurgents charged or condemned for rebellion and either allowing them to leave the country or to stay and join the state's reinsertion program. Then the FARC would release the hostages in its possession, including Ingrid Betancourt. The proposal would have been carried out with the backing and support of the French and Swiss governments, who publicly supported it once it was revealed.

The move was signaled as potentially positive by several relatives of the victims and Colombian political figures. Some critics of the president have considered that Uribe may seek to gain political prestige from such a move, though they would agree with the project in practice.

The FARC released a communiqué dated 20 August (but apparently published publicly only on 22 August) in which they denied having received the proposal earlier through the mediation of Switzerland as the government had stated. While making note of the fact that a proposal had been made by the Uribe administration and that it hoped that common ground could eventually be reached, the FARC criticized the offer because they believe that any deal should allow them to decide how many of its jailed comrades would be freed and that they should be allowed to return to the rebel ranks.

On 5 September, what has been considered as a sort of FARC counter proposal was revealed in the Colombian press. The FARC proposed that the government declare a "security" or "guarantee" zone for 72 hours in order for official insurgent and state negotiators to meet face to face and directly discuss a prisoner exchange. Government military forces would not have to leave the area but to concentrate in their available garrisons, in a similar move to that agreed by the Ernesto Samper administration (1994–1998) which involved the group freeing some captured security forces. In addition, the government's peace commissioner would have to make an official public pronouncement regarding this proposal.

If the zone were created, the first day would be used for traveling to the chosen location, the second to discuss the matter, and the third for the guerrillas to abandon the area. The government would be able to choose the location for the "security zone" from among the municipalities of Peñas Coloradas, El Rosal or La Tuna, all in Caquetá department, where the FARC had influence.

The FARC proposal to arrange a meeting with the government was considered as positive by Yolanda Pulecio, Betancourt's mother, who called it a sign of "progress […] just as the (government) commissioner can meet with (right-wing) paramilitaries, why can't he meet with the others, who are just as terrorist as they are."

==== 2006 ====
In February 2006, France urged the FARC to seize the chance offered by a European-proposed prisoner swap, accepted by Bogotá, and free dozens it had held for up to seven years. Foreign Minister Philippe Douste-Blazy said it was "up to the Revolutionary Armed Forces of Colombia (FARC) to show they were serious about releasing former Colombian presidential candidate Íngrid Betancourt and other detainees."

In an interview with French newspaper L'Humanité in June 2006, Raul Reyes, a leader of the FARC, said that Betancourt "is doing well, within the environment she finds herself in. It's not easy when one is deprived of freedom."

==== 2007 ====
In May 2007, a captured Colombian National Police sub-intendant, Jhon Frank Pinchao, escaped from FARC captivity, and claimed that Betancourt was being held in the same prison camp he had been in. On 18 May, President Álvaro Uribe reiterated his orders for the rescue by military means of Betancourt and other political figures.

Shortly after taking office in mid-May, French President Nicolas Sarkozy asked Uribe to release FARC's "chancellor" Rodrigo Granda in exchange for Betancourt.

On 4 June 30 incarcerated members from the FARC were liberated as a goodwill gesture by the government to pursue the liberation of Betancourt and others. However this did not result in her freedom.

On 26 July, Melanie Delloye, Betancourt's daughter, reported two French diplomats had been unsuccessful in confirming that she was still alive according to news agency EFE. President Sarkozy affirmed this to the press. However former hostage Pinchao repeated that Betancourt was alive, and had attempted to escape several times from the FARC camp where both were held, but had been recaptured and "severely punished".

In August 2007, reporter Patricia Poleo, a Venezuelan national self-exiled in the United States, stated that Betancourt was being held in Venezuela and that her release was near. The government of Colombia expressed doubts about this information through its minister of foreign affairs Fernando Araújo. Poleo also criticized Hugo Chávez for using this situation to improve relations with France after an impasse with the government of Jacques Chirac in which they refused to sell arms to Venezuela. A few days after Poleo's statements, President Chávez openly offered his services to negotiate between the FARC and the government in an effort to release those kidnapped, but denied knowing about the whereabouts of Betancourt.

On 11 November 2007, Chávez told French newspaper Le Figaro that he hoped to be able to show Sarkozy proof before their meeting on 20 November that Betancourt was alive, while on 18 November Chávez announced to the French press that he had been told by a FARC leader that she was still alive.

On 30 November, the Colombian government released information that they had captured three members of the urban cells of the FARC in Bogotá who had with them videos and letters of people held hostage by the FARC, including Betancourt. In the video Betancourt appears in the jungle sitting on a bench looking at the ground. She "appeared extremely gaunt". A letter intended for Íngrid's mother, Yolanda, which was found at the same time, was also published in several newspapers.

==== 2008 ====
In 2008, Chávez, with the initial permission of the Colombian government and the participation of the International Red Cross, organized humanitarian operations in order to receive several civilian hostages whose release had been announced by FARC. The first operation led to the release of Clara Rojas and Consuelo González. Emmanuel, Rojas's son born in captivity, had been freed previously after a stunning declaration from president Uribe, where it was discovered the infant was left in a foster home after being severely mistreated by the guerrillas.

On 27 February a second operation was carried out, freeing four former members of the Colombian Congress. The released hostages were very concerned about the health of Betancourt. One described her as "exhausted physically and in her morale. […] Ingrid is mistreated very badly, they have vented their anger on her, they have her chained up in inhumane conditions." Another said that she had hepatitis B and was "near the end". Nicolas Sarkozy said he was prepared to personally go to accept her release if necessary.

On 27 March, the Colombian government, with Uribe's support, offered to free hundreds of guerrilla fighters in exchange for Betancourt's release.

On 31 March, Colombian news station Caracol quoted several sources saying Betancourt had stopped taking her medication and stopped eating. She was said to be in desperate need of a blood transfusion.

On 2 April, Betancourt's son, Lorenzo Delloye, addressed the FARC and the President Uribe, to facilitate her release in order to prevent her death. He quoted the need for a blood transfusion in order to keep her alive saying that otherwise she may die in the next few hours.

On 3 April, an envoy left for Colombia to try to make contact with Betancourt and many of the other captives, who had become ill after years of captivity in the jungle. After two days, the envoy, including a doctor, still had not heard from the FARC, but received orders from the French government to wait. Five days after arrival of the envoy the FARC released a press note on the Bolivarian Press Agency website, refusing the mission access to their hostages, because "the French medical mission was not appropriate and, moreover, was not the result of an agreement." Following the FARC's refusal, the French government called off the humanitarian mission and said foreign minister Bernard Kouchner would visit the region.

On 2 July news reports stated that Betancourt and three American hostages were recovered (see Rescue below). Altogether, 15 hostages were freed, including 11 Colombian soldiers. Minister of National Defense Juan Manuel Santos said all the former hostages were in reasonably good health, although Betancourt stated she was tortured during her captivity.

== Rescue ==
On 2 July 2008, Minister of Defense Juan Manuel Santos called a press conference to announce the rescue of Betancourt and 14 other captives. The operation that won their release, codenamed "Jaque" (Spanish for "check" as in checkmate), included members of the Colombian military intelligence who infiltrated local FARC squads and the secretariat of FARC, according to Santos. The FARC members in charge of the hostages were persuaded to accept a request from headquarters to gather the hostages together, supposedly to be flown to FARC chief Alfonso Cano. Instead, they were flown by government personnel dressed as FARC members to San José del Guaviare. No one was harmed during the rescue. Three American Northrop Grumman contractors, Marc Gonsalves, Keith Stansell, and Thomas Howes, were among those released.

Colombian military agents spent months planting themselves within FARC, gaining the members' trust, and joining the leadership council. Other agents were assigned to guard the hostages. Using their authority in the group, the agents ordered the hostages moved from three different locations to a central area. From this point, the hostages, agents, and about 60 real FARC members made a 90-mile march through the jungle to a spot where, agents told the FARC members, an "international mission" was coming to check on the hostages. On schedule, an unmarked white helicopter set down and Colombian security forces posing as FARC members jumped out. They told the FARC members that they would take the hostages to the meeting with the "international mission." All of the captives were handcuffed and placed aboard the helicopter, along with two of their FARC guards, who were quickly disarmed and subdued after the helicopter lifted off. According to Betancourt, a crew member then turned and told the 15 hostages, "We are the national military. You are free." Tracking technology was used by the rescuers to zero in on their target.

On 16 July 2008 it became public that one of the Colombian officials was misusing a Red Cross emblem during the rescue operation. Under international humanitarian law this is a war crime.

== Political consequences ==
The liberated Betancourt thanked the Colombian armed forces and President Álvaro Uribe and gave her approval to Uribe's third term as a president. She urged neighbouring presidents Hugo Chávez (Venezuela) and Rafael Correa (Ecuador) to help Colombia and seek the political transformations in her country by democratic means. And she stated that she would dedicate herself to helping those who were still held captive in the jungle. Some believe that the liberation of Betancourt caused a dramatic change of the political scene.

In an interview on French radio shortly after her return to France Betancourt distanced herself from Uribe's approach while accepting that his security policy had been successful. She said the situation was at a point where "the vocabulary has to change", arguing that "the way in which we talk about the other side is very important". She also thanked president Hugo Chávez "for his help in recovering the freedom of many Colombian hostages" during their meeting in Caracas in 2010.

== Reunion and celebration ==
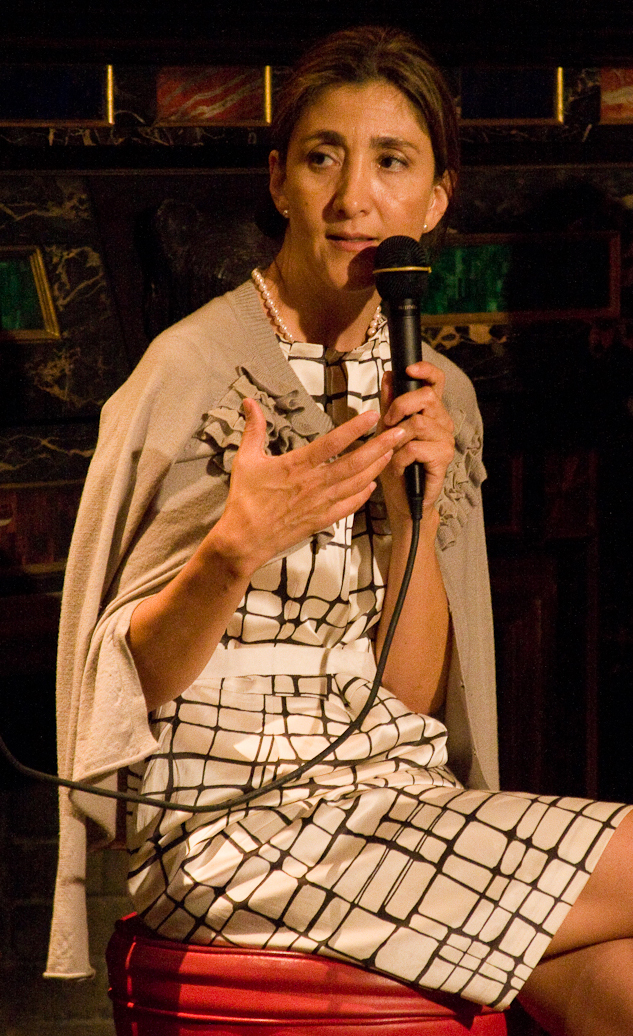
Betancourt in September 2010

Sarkozy sent a French Air Force jet with Betancourt's children, her sister Astrid and her family and accompanied by Foreign Minister, Bernard Kouchner, for a tearful reunion. After paying her respects at her father's tomb she and the family boarded the jet and flew to France, where she was greeted by Sarkozy and the First Lady Carla Bruni-Sarkozy. She gave speeches and urged the world not to forget and to continue for the liberation of the rest of the hostages. She also spent several days in hospital.

On 9 July President Michelle Bachelet of Chile said she would nominate Betancourt for a Nobel Prize. Nicolas Sarkozy announced that she would receive the Legion of Honor at the Bastille Day celebrations.

On 20 July, Betancourt appeared next to singer Juanes at a rally in Trocadéro in Paris to celebrate Colombia's independence day and to once more urge the FARC to release all their hostages. Speaking directly to Alfonso Cano she said:

See this Colombia, see the extended hand of President Uribe, and understand that it is time to stop the bloodshed. It is time to drop those weapons and change them for roses, substitute them with tolerance, respect, and as brothers that we are, find a way so that we can all live together in the world, live together in Colombia."

=== Allegations of payment ===
On 4 July 2008, Radio Suisse Romande reported that unnamed "reliable sources" had told it the rescue took place after a payment of US$20 million by the United States. According to Le Monde, the French Foreign Ministry denied the payment of any ransom by France.

Frederich Blassel, the author of the Radio Suisse Romande story, told Colombia's W Radio that, according to his source, the release was not negotiated directly with the FARC but with alias César, one of the two guerrillas captured during the operation, who would have received the payment of US$20 million. According to Blassel, the two rebels could be given new identities by Spain, France and Switzerland.

The Minister of Defense Juan Manuel Santos, and Vice President Francisco Santos, in response to these claims, denied any payment. "That information is absolutely false. It has no basis. We don't know where it comes from and why its being said". He also added with a touch of irony that "Actually, it would have been a cheap offer, because we were willing to give up to USD 100 million […] We would be the first to inform publicly, because it is part of our rewards system policy, and besides, it would speak much worse about the FARC."

According to Colombia's El Tiempo and W Radio, General Fredy Padilla de León, Commander of the Colombian Armed Forces, denied the existence of any payment by the Colombian government. General Padilla argued that if any payment had been made, it would have been better to make it publicly known, to use it as an incentive and to cause confusion within FARC's ranks.

=== Compensation request ===
In June 2010 Betancourt requested from the Colombian justice, as other Colombian hostages previously had, monetary compensation under the Colombian law on protecting victims of terrorism. She presented her request on the grounds of having been victim of a lack of protection when her escorts were dismissed on 23 February 2002, which enabled rebels to kidnap her. The Colombian government said she was attacking in court the soldiers who had liberated her in 2008. Colombian vice president Francisco Santos said that the "lawsuit" deserved a "world prize for greed, ungratefulness and gall".

A few days after the news of the request had broken and public indignation had been added to the government's, Betancourt's lawyer, Gabriel Devis, said that the focus had to be on the "protection mechanisms the Colombian state offers to its citizens" and that nobody was attacking any soldier. He stressed that the former hostage was "deeply grateful" to "the armed forces and all those who in one way or another risked their lives to free the hostages."

Betancourt withdrew her claim for compensation, expressing her indignation at the way in which her undertaking had been distorted and the public opinion manipulated. She had suffered what she called a "public lapidation as if she was a criminal".

== Apologies from the abductor ==
On 15 April 2008, Betancourt's abductor, Nolberto Uni Vega, said to journalists attending his trial in Combita that he was sorry for abducting the former presidential candidate and that he felt "remorse" over her plight. Uni gave a letter of apology to a journalist for delivery to Betancourt's mother, who passed it on to President Sarkozy.

== La Nuit Blanche ==
In October 2007, Bertrand Delanoë, the mayor of Paris, announced the upcoming Nuit Blanche, saying, "This year, both Paris and Rome want to dedicate La Nuit Blanche to Ingrid Bétancourt. [She is] an honorary citizen of the city of Paris, and an especially (committed and involved) woman, who has been held in Colombia by the FARC since 23 February 2002. We will [continue to] fight unceasingly for her release."

== Out of Captivity book ==
In their book titled Out of Captivity, American Northrop Grumman contractors Marc Gonsalves, Keith Stansell, and Thomas Howes, all of whom spent time as hostages with Betancourt, described her behavior while a captive of FARC as selfish, as was her belief she deserved better treatment than the other captives owing to her political and social standing. The Americans, held captive by the FARC from 2003 to 2008, stated that throughout their captivity Betancourt claimed and took more than her fair share of scarce food, clothing, and personal space. Stansell said, "I can get over just about anything, but I don't know about Ingrid. Forgive? Yes. Move on? Yes. Respect? No." Marc Gonsalves has defended Betancourt, and stated: "For me she is a courageous person, she behaved like only heroes do, this is why I am so hurt with Keith's attacks."

Betancourt declined to comment on the Americans' allegations. In 2009, a spokesperson said Betancourt was "dedicated to writing her own book and not making declarations until it is finished."

== Life after the rescue ==
Betancourt received the Ordre national de la Légion d'honneur (National Order of the Legion of Honour) shortly after her rescue and the Prince of Asturias Award of Concord in October 2008. She also met with international heads of state and international personalities such as Secretary General of the United Nations Ban Ki-moon, Pope Benedict XVI, King Juan Carlos of Spain and Prime Minister José Luis Rodríguez Zapatero, President Álvaro Uribe of Colombia, President Hugo Chávez of Venezuela and President Cristina Kirchner of Argentina.

In 2009, she signed with Gallimard to write her memoirs. The resulting book, published on 21 September 2010 after 15 months of writing, is titled Même le silence a une fin (Even Silence Has an End: My Six Years of Captivity in the Colombian Jungle). It mainly describes Betancourt's ordeal as a hostage of Colombian guerrillas and was praised as an "extraordinary adventure story", expressing her anguish in a poetic way. Her writing was compared to the greatest authors'; "just think of Aleksandr Solzhenitsyn and The Gulag Archipelago or novelists like Dumas and Arthur Koestler", writes Larry Rohter in The New York Times Book review.

Betancourt filed for divorce in 2009.

Betancourt stated, "I think we have that animal inside of us, all of us…. We can be so horrible to the others. For me it was like understanding what I couldn't understand before, how, for example, the Nazis, how this could happen."

== Recognition ==
She was recognized as one of the BBC's 100 women of 2013.

== See also ==
- List of kidnappings
- List of solved missing person cases (2000s)

Party political offices
New political party	Oxygen Green Party nominee for President of Colombia; 2002	Party dissolved
Party re-established	Oxygen Green Party nominee for President of Colombia; 2022	Most recent
