= William Parra (journalist) =

Colombian journalist

William Eduardo Parra Jaimes (b. 1966 ) is a Colombian journalist. Since November 2024 he has been director of the news system of RTVC Sistema de Medios Públicos, Colombia's public media organisation.

== Career ==
He has worked for Caracol Radio, Reuters, and RCN TV, and in the 1990s was press secretary for then-Colombian President Ernesto Samper. He worked for TeleSUR full-time from 2006 to 2008, and subsequently as a freelance journalist. On 25 September 2013 he interviewed Syrian President Bashar al-Assad for TeleSUR.

He later worked in Colombia for the news programme CM&, remaining there until its final broadcast on 14 November 2024, which ended almost 33 years on air.

== Kidnapping and attacks ==
Parra was kidnapped for 10 days in December 1997, by men claiming to be members of the Medellin cartel. Arrests were later made of members of Jaime Bateman Cayon's rebel group. In 2000 he fled to Spain following death threats, and in 2005 he was attacked and seriously injured near Bogotá.

== FARC investigation ==
In September 2010 a Colombian judge ordered Parra's arrest over alleged links to the FARC rebels; the case against him included charges of rebellion, criminal association and the financing of terrorism. Parra denied the accusations, and said in September 2010 that his lawyers had received death threats. He remained in Venezuela, where he had been living since 2007, while the proceedings continued.

On 11 March 2015 a specialised court in Bogotá closed the investigation and cleared Parra of the charges. The prosecution case had rested on material seized from computers belonging to the FARC commander Raúl Reyes, which the Supreme Court of Justice had ruled inadmissible as evidence in 2011.

== RTVC ==
In November 2024, Parra was appointed director of the news system of RTVC Sistema de Medios Públicos, Colombia's public media organisation. The position brought together the news operations of RTVC Noticias, Radio Nacional de Colombia and the organisation's digital news team. RTVC described Parra as a journalist with more than three decades of experience in national and international media, including work with Caracol Televisión, RCN Radio, TeleSUR and Reuters.

Parra remained in the role during 2025. He also directed the news programme El Calentao, which was broadcast by Señal Colombia and Radio Nacional de Colombia. In April 2025, the programme was broadcast from Cali to mark the anniversary of the 2021 Colombian protests, with coverage featuring social leaders, activists and residents affected by the events.

In March 2025, Parra publicly responded to allegations of censorship within RTVC, stating that journalists working for the public broadcaster had not been instructed to stop carrying out their reporting. His comments came amid wider public controversy concerning the editorial direction and independence of RTVC's news operations.

In October 2025, Parra called on Colombia's National Police and the Attorney General's Office to investigate threats posted on the social-media platform X against RTVC's management and journalists. The incident was reported by RTVC during its El Calentao Informativo programme.
