= Political influence of Evangelicalism in Latin America =

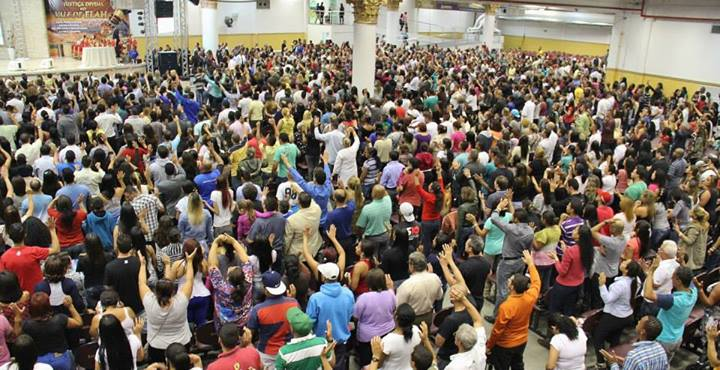
Evangelical Church in Brazil

The political influence of evangelicalism in Latin America was marginal at first, but since the start of the 21st century, news reports and political analysts have since highlighted the significant weight the evangelical Christian community holds and its impact on electoral politics in Latin America, even helping secure electoral victories for conservative candidates. Largely originating from the Anglosphere, particularly the United States, this growth represents a disruptive transformation of a region that had been predominantly Catholic since the European colonization of the Americas. Evangelicalism has surged from about 4% of Latin America's population in the 1970s to roughly 20–25% in the 2020s.

Evangelical political parties are a particular type of political party in Latin America generally linked or known to advocate for the interests of the evangelical Christian community. They are normally associated with certain stances like cultural conservatism, strong opposition to same-sex marriage and LGBT rights, legalization of abortion, drug liberalization and marijuana legalization, what they refer to as gender ideology or identity politics, gun control, and globalism. Although exceptions exist, they tend to be located on the right side of the spectrum due to the associated prosperity theology, whilst supporting such things as the death penalty, "hard hand" on crime, corporal punishment for minors and harsher laws for juvenile delinquents.

== History ==
Evangelical missionary groups, mainly from the charismatic movement originating in the Deep South of the United States, were introduced deliberately as a strategy from Washington particularly during Republican administrations as a way to reduce the influence of left-leaning Roman Catholic social movements, such as liberation theology (which was popular among many far-left political parties and guerrillas), and the more moderate Christian socialist and Christian democratic parties. Guatemalan archbishop Próspero Penados also blamed the US for encouraging and sponsoring evangelicalism in Guatemala. According to him, this was for more political than religious reasons: "The diffusion of Evangelicalism in Guatemala is more part of an economic and political strategy" to oppose the Catholic social justice doctrine". Meanwhile, some conservative Catholics have blamed the widespread prevalence of liberation theology among the clergy in Latin America for the exodus of believers to evangelicalism and have criticized the proponents of liberation theology for a lack of focus on Jesus Christ in favor of left-wing social doctrine.

In recent decades, the Catholic Church has suffered a drain of followers, some of whom have become irreligious, agnostic or atheist. Some have also converted to other religions like Buddhism, Islam and new religious movements; however, a large segment of former Catholics, particularly those of more humble origins and lower classes, have joined evangelical churches, with neo-Pentecostal and charismatic movements proving popular. Pentecostalism also became popular among the lower-income classes and the most abandoned sectors of society, especially those of very poor and peripheral areas who see the churches' ideas of economic growth through faith as an opportunity for social mobility. In any case, the growth of evangelicals was quickly followed by their newly discovered political and electoral weight, with new forms of political activism and even the creation of specific political parties connected to their communities. Guatemalan dictator Efraín Ríos Montt was one of the first evangelical Christians to attain power in Latin America's history.

Some examples of these movements include evangelical Christian support of Alfonso Portillo, Jorge Serrano and Jimmy Morales (the latter two themselves evangelicals) in Guatemala, Juan Orlando Hernández in Honduras, Mauricio Macri in Argentina, and Sebastián Piñera in Chile. Evangelical opposition to the Colombian peace agreement referendum is considered by many pivotal in its rejection, as was the evangelical parties' support of the impeachment of Dilma Rousseff in Brazil. Countries with notorious conservative right-wing candidates supported by evangelicals include Guatemala, where Manuel Baldizón came close to a victory twice (2011 and 2015); Bolivia, where Chi Hyun Chung came third in 2019; Venezuela, where pastor Javier Bertucci was the nominee with the third-highest vote total; Costa Rica, where preacher and gospel singer Fabricio Alvarado went into the electoral run-off; and Brazil, where evangelical Christians were pivotal in the triumph of Jair Bolsonaro.

However, in some countries the alliance was with the left. Evangelicals supported Hugo Chávez in the 1998 election as much as other Venezuelans. The Authentic Renewal Organization is a Venezuelan evangelical political party and member of the official Great Patriotic Pole of President Nicolás Maduro. Daniel Ortega was also supported by evangelical pastors in Nicaragua and his wife and Vice President Rosario Murillo has links with evangelical churches. Ortega's United Alliance Nicaragua Triumphs regularly includes evangelical parties like the Christian Unity Movement or the Nicaraguan Party of the Christian Path. The Social Encounter Party in Mexico is also unofficially linked to the Mexican evangelical community (as the Mexican Constitution forbids the existence of confessional parties) and is a member of the Juntos Haremos Historia coalition that endorsed leftist Andrés Manuel López Obrador, a move that drew criticism as it was a coalition with two left-wing parties. Agricultural People's Front of Peru is noted to be syncretic and having left-wing influences. Álvaro Colom's running mate in 1999 Guatemalan general election Vitalino Similox was a progressive Presbyterian pastor who ran on a different platform compared to the other more right-wing evangelical candidates.

== Positions ==
The movement is generally characterized by its staunch cultural conservatism (even for Latin American standards) with very strong opposition to same-sex marriage, LGBT rights, legalization of abortion, drug liberalization and marijuana legalization, "gender ideology" and identity politics, gun control and globalism. Some may hold strong anti-communist and anti-socialist positions and endorse neoliberal and pro-free market capitalist ideas in part due to the prosperity theology that many hold. Some conspiracy theories like Cultural Marxism and the New World Order have proven popular among its base. South American evangelicals also tend to follow Christian Zionism and be supporters of Israel, supporting policies such as the moving of the embassies of their countries to Jerusalem.

Some have been described also as supporters of the death penalty, "hard hand" on crime, creationism (and opposition to teaching the scientific theories of evolution and Big Bang in schools), corporal punishment for children and harsher laws for juvenile delinquents. Their most critical opponents signal them as having far-right, religious fundamentalist, theocratic, anti-democratic and authoritarian ideas wanting to replace democracy with theocracy.

Roman Catholics in Latin America tend to be relatively more left-wing in economics due to the traditional teachings of Catholic social doctrine and Christian democracy. Evangelical Christians, on the other hand, are mostly from the neo-Pentecostal movement and thus believers in prosperity theology, which justifies most of their neoliberal economic ideas.

== Political positions in contrast to other groups ==
=== With Roman Catholics ===
- Social conservatism: According to the Pew Research Center: "Even though the Catholic Church opposes abortion and same-sex marriage, Catholics in Latin America tend to be less conservative than Evangelicals on these kinds of social issues. On average, Catholics are less morally opposed to abortion, homosexuality, artificial means of birth control, sex outside of marriage, divorce and drinking alcohol than are Evangelicals."
- Evolution: Catholics tend to be more accepting of evolution than Evangelicals.
- Economic liberalism: On the whole, Latin Americans embrace free-market principles, but Catholics also tend to be more economically progressive, having a tendency to support more left-wing positions and the welfare state to varying degrees, from far-left liberation theology, which permeates many left-wing parties, to much more moderate Christian socialist and Christian Democratic postures. Evangelicals, on the other hand—although exceptions exist—tend to be economically right-wing, staunchly anti-communist and support liberal economy and capitalism.
- Class: In Latin America most neo-Pentecostals and other Evangelicals are mostly from working class and lower-income groups, whilst Catholicism is still prevalent among the middle and upper class and among professionals and the political elite.
- Christian Zionism: The Catholic position regarding the Arab–Israeli conflict may vary greatly; although strong support for Israel among Catholics is not unusual, anti-Zionism is also prevalent among both the far left (especially liberation-theology and Christian-left Catholics) and the far-right (traditionalists, Sedevacantists, etc.). The Vatican established relations with Israel in 1993, has its diplomatic representation in Tel Aviv, and recognizes the State of Palestine, advocating for a two-state solution; thus, many centrist Catholics follow these lines. Evangelical Christians, however, tend to be overwhelmingly pro-Israel due to traditional Christian Zionism and support the recognition of Jerusalem as its capital.

=== With agnostics, atheists and the nonreligious ===
Atheists, agnostics and non-religious people are the third-largest group of Latin America behind Catholics and Evangelicals. Overlap with conservative neo-Pentecostals is scarce. Although exceptions exist, non-religious Latin Americans tend to be strongly culturally liberal, generally more than the average Latin American, being much more likely to support such things like secularism, abortion, same-sex marriage and birth control than their Catholic counterparts, and especially the neo-Pentecostal community. Non-religious people are also much more supportive of Palestine than Israel and come mostly from the middle and upper class, especially the professional and intellectual camps. Although economically and politically the non-religious may also support right-wing libertarian, liberal and economically conservative ideas, it is also slightly more common for secularists to fall towards the left and center-left of the spectrum.

=== With other religions ===
Brazil's Spiritualist community has criticized the evangelical position on human rights, social justice and economic policies.

The Brazilian Muslim community is split on the issue of supporting or rejecting right-wing figures like Donald Trump and Jair Bolsonaro. Muslims in the West tend to be socially conservative but economically progressive.

== Corruption cases ==
=== Brazil ===
==== Pastor Magno Malta ====
Prominent Pentecostal politicians in Brazil have been involved in cases of corruption and law violations. Since 2007 Federal deputy Pastor Magno Malta was in involved in many scandals including embezzlement, nepotism, bribing and issuance of fake bill of goods.

==== Pastor Everaldo Pereira ====
In 2012, Pastor Everaldo Pereira was convicted and ordered to pay his ex-wife, Katia Maia, an indemnity of R$ 85,000 (US$ 26,350) for material and moral damage. Pastor Everaldo asked the Justice Court of Rio de Janeiro (TJ-RJ) to overturn the decision and was acquitted by the Supreme Federal Court. In 2013, Pereira's ex-wife initiated a new judicial process in the Superior Court of Justice (STJ), alleging that the pastor committed physical violence, followed by death threats. Katia Maia said that during the aggression there were "kicks and punches, that caused a puncture in [her] eardrum". Pereira, however, said he acted in legitimate self-defense after a car pursuit in the streets of Rio de Janeiro.

==== Pastor Marco Feliciano ====
Federal deputy Pastor Marco Feliciano, one of the most prominent names of the Social Christian Party (Partido Social Cristão, PSC), stated that Africans were cursed by Noah, leading to accusations of racism.

The deputy was falsely accused of attempted rape and assault by 22-year-old Patricia Lelis, a PSC activist who attended the same church as the pastor. The deputy chief of staff, Talma Bauer, was arrested for initially being suspected of kidnapping the young woman and forcing her to record videos defending the deputy in order to dismiss the initial complaint. After a police inquiry, Bauer was released and the São Paulo Civil Police concluded that there was no kidnapping or aggression, and requested the arrest of Lélis for the crimes of slanderous denunciation and extortion against Bauer.

=== Guatemala ===
==== Jimmy Morales ====
In January 2017, Samuel "Sammy" Morales, the older brother and close adviser of Guatemalan President Jimmy Morales, whose campaign slogan was, "neither corrupt, nor a crook", as well as one of Morales' sons, José Manuel Morales, were arrested on corruption and money laundering charges. According to media reports, the arrests prompted several large protests of up to 15,000 people demanding President Morales' removal.

Jimmy Morales ordered the expulsion of Colombian Iván Velásquez, commissioner of the International Commission Against Impunity in Guatemala (CICIG), after it began "investigating claims that his party took illegal donations, including from drug-traffickers" and asked "congress to strip him of immunity from prosecution." After Minister of foreign affairs Carlos Raul Morales refused to sign the executive order, he was removed from office along with viceminister Carlos Ramiro Martínez. The Constitutional Court of Guatemala finally blocked the move.

Furthermore, former cabinet minister Édgar Gutiérrez accused Jimmy Morales of having sexually abused young female public workers with complicity of other government officials.

== Criticism ==
Some parties and candidates are criticized for being supporters of creationism over the scientific theories of evolution and the Big Bang.

They are also often accused of far-right, religious fundamentalist, theocratic, anti-democratic and authoritarian ideologies, or for planning to replace democracy with theocracy.

== Political parties ==
Country	Party
Brazil	Social Christian Party (factions)
Brazil	Patriota
Brazil	Republicanos (factions)
Brazil	Liberal Party (1985) (factions)
Chile	Christian Conservative Party
Chile	Christian Social Party
Chile	New Time
Colombia	Independent Movement of Absolute Renovation
Colombia	Fair and Free Colombia
Colombia	Christian National Party
Colombia	Christian Union Movement
Colombia	Civic and Christian Commitment for the Community
Costa Rica	National Restoration Party
Costa Rica	Costa Rican Renewal Party
Costa Rica	Christian Democratic Alliance
Costa Rica	New Republic Party
Guatemala	Cambio
Guatemala	Institutional Republican Party (factions) (previously Guatemalan Republican Front)
Guatemala	National Advancement Party (factions)
Guatemala	National Convergence Front
Guatemala	Renewed Democratic Liberty
Guatemala	Solidarity Action Movement (later Democratic Renewal Action Party)
Guatemala	Vision with Values
Guatemala	Valor
Mexico	Social Encounter Party
Mexico	Solidarity Encounter Party
Nicaragua	Nicaraguan Party of the Christian Path
Nicaragua	Christian Unity Movement
Nicaragua	Alternative for Change
Panama	Independent Social Alternative Party
Peru	Agricultural People's Front of Peru
Peru	Popular Force (factions) (previously Cambio 90)
Peru	National Restoration (historically)
Puerto Rico	Proyecto Dignidad (factions; including its leader)
Venezuela	Authentic Renewal Organization
Venezuela	Esperanza por El Cambio

== Electoral performance ==
=== Evangelical Presidential candidates ===
Election	Candidate	Party	First round				Second round			
Election	Candidate	Party	Votes	%	Position	Result	Votes	%	Position	Result
Bolivia
2019	Chi Hyun Chung	PDC	539,081	8.78%	3rd	Lost	—N/a			
2020	Chi Hyun Chung	FPV	95,255	1.55%	4th	Lost	—N/a			
Brazil
2014	Everaldo Pereira	PSC	780,513	0.75%	5th	Lost	—N/a			
2018	Cabo Daciolo	Patriota	1,348,323	1,26%	6th	Lost	—N/a			
Colombia
1990	Claudia Rodríguez de Castellanos	PNC	33,645	0.56%	6th	Lost	—N/a			
1994	José Antonio Cortes Huertas	C4	11,704	0.20%	10th	Lost	—N/a			
1998	Beatríz Cuellar	MUC	30,832	0.29%	5th	Lost	—N/a			
Costa Rica
1986	Alejandro Madrigal Benavides	ANC	5,647	0.58%	5th	Lost	—N/a			
1990	Fernando Ramírez Muñoz	ANC	4,209	0.31%	4th	Lost	—N/a			
1994	Rafael Ángel Matamoros	ANC	4,980	0.33%	4th	Lost	—N/a			
1998	Sherman Thomas Jackson	PRC	19,313	1.39%	5th	Lost	—N/a			
1998	Alejandro Madrigal Benavides	ANC	3,545	0.26%	9th	Lost	—N/a			
2002	Justo Orozco	PRC	16,404	1.07%	5th	Lost	—N/a			
2002	Marvin Calvo Montoya	ANC	1,271	0.08%	11th	Lost	—N/a			
2006	Bolívar Serrano	PRC	15,539	0.96%	9th	Lost	—N/a			
2010	Mayra González	PRC	13,945	0.73%	6th	Lost	—N/a			
2014	Carlos Avendaño	PRN	27,691	1.35%	7th	Lost	—N/a			
2014	Justo Orozco	PRC	16,721	0.81%	8th	Lost	—N/a			
2018	Fabricio Alvarado	PRN	505,214	24.91%	1st	─	822,997	39.21%	2nd	Lost
2018	Mario Redondo	ADC	12,638	0.59%	10th	Lost	—N/a			
2018	Carlos Avendaño	PRC	12,309	0.57%	11th	Lost	—N/a			
2022	Fabricio Alvarado	PNR	311,633	14.88%	3rd	Lost	—N/a			
2022	Eduardo Cruickshank	PRN	11,160	0.53%	15th	Lost	—N/a			
2022	Christian Rivera Paniagua	ADC	5,697	0.27%	18th	Lost	—N/a			
Guatemala
1990–1	Jorge Serrano Elías	PAS	375,165	24.14%	2nd	–	936,389	68.08%	1st	Won
1990–1	Álvaro Arzú	PAN	268,796	17.29%	4th	Lost	—N/a			
1995–6	Álvaro Arzú	PAN	565,393	36.50%	1st	─	671,354	51.22%	1st	Won
1999	Francisco Bianchi	ADRE	45,470	2.07%	5th	Lost	—N/a			
2003	Efraín Ríos Montt	FRG	518,328	19.31%	3rd	Lost	—N/a			
2011	Manuel Baldizón	LIDER	1,016,340	22.82%	2nd	─	1,981,048	46.26%	2nd	Lost
2011	Harold Caballeros	VIVA	277,365	6.23%	5th	Lost	—N/a			
2011	Patricia Escobar	PU	97,498	2.19%	8th	Lost	—N/a			
2015	Jimmy Morales	FCN	1,152,394	23.99%	1st	─	2,751,058	67.44%	1st	Won
2015	Manuel Baldizón	LIDER	930,905	19.38%	3rd	Lost	—N/a			
2015	Zury Ríos	VIVA	286,730	5.97%	5th	Lost	—N/a			
2019	Roberto Arzú	Podemos–PAN	267,049	6.10%	5th	Lost	—N/a			
2019	Isaac Farchi	VIVA	259,616	5.93%	6th	Lost	—N/a			
2019	Estuardo Galdámez	FCN	180,414	4.12%	8th	Lost	—N/a			
2023	Armando Castillo	VIVA	397,469	9.44%	4th	Lost	—N/a			
2023	Zury Ríos	Valor–PU	366,574	8.70%	6th	Lost	—N/a			
2023	Sammy Morales	FCN	22,816	0.54%	20th	Lost	—N/a			
Nicaragua
1996	Guillermo Osorno	CCN	71,908	4.09%	3rd	Lost	—N/a			
2021	Guillermo Osorno	CCN	89,853	3.26%	3rd	Lost	—N/a			
Panama
2024	Melitón Arrocha	PAIS	4,660	0.20%	8th	Lost	—N/a			
Peru
2006	Humberto Lay	RN	537,564	4.38%	6th	Lost	—N/a			
Puerto Rico (Governor)
2020	César Vázquez Muñiz	PD	87,379	6.79%	5th	Lost	—N/a			
2024	Javier Jiménez	PD	81,369	6.38%	4th	Lost	—N/a			
Venezuela
1988	Godofredo Marín	ORA	62,896	0.86%	4th	Lost	—N/a			
1993	Modesto Rivero	ORA	20,814	0.37%	5th	Lost	—N/a			
2006	Luis Reyes	Joven	4,807	0.04%	3rd	Lost	—N/a			
2012	Luis Reyes	ORA	8,214	0.06%	4th	Lost	—N/a			
2013	Eusebio Mendez	NUVIPA	19,498	0.13%	3rd	Lost	—N/a			
2018	Javier Bertucci	El Cambio	989,761	10.75%	3rd	Lost	—N/a			
2024	Javier Bertucci	El Cambio	64,452	0.52%	7th	Lost	—N/a			

=== Parliamentary ===
Election	Parties	Votes	%
Brazil (Chamber of Deputies)
2018	Patriota	1,432,304	1.46%
2022	Patriota	1,526,570	1.40%
Chile (Chamber of Deputies)
2021	PCC+NT	44,980	0.71%
Colombia (Senate)
1991	MUC+PNC	95,161	1.79%
1994	MUC+C4+PNC	132,930	2.55%
1994	MUC+C4	98,612	1.14%
2002	MIRA+MUC+C4+PNC	223,490	2.41%
2006	MIRA+C4	324,121	3.52%
2010	MIRA	324,109	2.96%
2014	MIRA	334,836	2.82%
2018	MIRA+CJL	959,027	6.28%
2018	MIRA+CJL	584,806	3.44%
Costa Rica
1986	ANC	19,972	1.70%
1990	ANC	22,149	1.66%
1994	ANC	21,064	1.43%
1998	PRC+ANC	37,068	2.68%
2002	PRC+ANC	61,524	4.04%
2006	PRN+PRC	88,707	5.50%
2010	PRN+PRC	117,931	6.21%
2014	PRN+ADC+PRC	191,234	9.34%
2018	PRN+ADC+PRC	482,217	22.56%
2022	PRN+PRN+ADC	270,044	13.01%
Mexico (Chamber of Deputies)
2015	PES	1,325,032	3.49%
2018	PES	1,353,499	2.50%
2021	PES	1,352,388	2.38%
Nicaragua
1996	CCN	63,867	3.72%
2006	AC	12,053	0.54%
2021	CCN	53,959	1.96%
Panama
2024	PAIS	34,250	1.60%
Peru
2006	RN	432,209	4.02%
Puerto Rico (House of Representatives)
2020	PD	79,166	6.85%
2024	PD	84.796	6.67%
Venezuela
1988	ORA	92,117	1.28%
1993	ORA	41,085	0.87%
1998	ORA	29,355	0.60%
2000	ORA	1,066	0.02%
2005	ORA	606	0.02%
2015	NUVIPA+ORA	111,957	0.81%
2020	El Cambio+ORA+NUVIPA	321,769	5.14%

== See also ==
- Apocalypse in the Tropics
- Conservative wave
- Catholic social teaching
- Christian libertarianism
- Christianity and politics
- Brazlian Evangelical Parliamentary Front
- Pink Tide
- Political Catholicism
- Rerum novarum
- United States involvement in regime change in Latin America
- Social justice

== Bibliography ==
- Colbi, Gerald. Dennett, Charlotte. (1996), Thy Will Be Done: The Conquest of the Amazon : Nelson Rockefeller and Evangelism in the Age of Oil
- Freston, Paul (2008). Evangelical Christianity and Democracy in Latin America. Print ISBN 9780195174762. Oxford Publishing.
- Robbins, Joel (October 2004). Brenneis, Don; Strier, Karen B. (eds.). "The Globalization of Pentecostal and Charismatic Christianity". Annual Review of Anthropology. 33. Annual Reviews: 117–143. doi:10.1146/annurev.anthro.32.061002.093421. ISSN 1545-4290. JSTOR 25064848. S2CID 145722188.
