= Sara Castellanos =

Colombian politician (born 1992)

Sara Guerra

Senator of Colombia
- Incumbent
- Assumed office July 20, 2026

Councilor of Bogotá
- In office January 1, 2020 – December 12, 2022
- Leader: Álvaro Acevedo Leguizamón

Personal details
- Born: Sara Jimena Castellanos Rodríguez; March 13, 1992 (age 34) Bogotá, D.C., Colombia
- Party: National Salvation Movement (2026-present)
- Other political affiliations: Liberal (2020-2024)
- Spouse: Laudjur Guerra (m. 2015)
- Parents: César Castellanos; Emma Claudia Castellanos
- Education: Regent University (BA)

Sara Jimena Castellanos Guerra (née Castellanos; born March 13, 1992) is a Colombian political scientist and politician who has served as a Senator of Colombia since 2026. A member of the National Salvation Movement, she previously served as a Councilor of Bogotá.

Born in Bogotá, D.C., Guerra holds a degree in International Relations from Regent University. She has been known for her stances on social protest and adoption by same-sex couples.

== Early life and career ==
Sara Jimena Castellanos Rodríguez was born on March 13, 1992, in Bogotá, D.C., to pastors César and Emma Claudia (née Rodríguez Almanza). Both were founders and members of the Christian National Party, in which César served as a representative from 1998 to 2002 and Emma Claudia as a senator on three occasions. Her father was the founder of the International Charismatic Mission Church. Sara grew up in an environment with strong, ingrained family values, which would later influence her upbringing. In 2015, she married Pastor Laudjur Guerra, with whom she also serves as a pastor.

In 2019, she ran for a seat on the Bogotá City Council, receiving the endorsement of the Liberal Party. Guerra took office in January 2020, but in March 2021, she resigned to run for the Senate in the 2022 legislative elections, where she was not elected. After losing the election, Sara dedicated herself full-time to her family and the church. Guerra holds a degree in Government and International Relations from Regent University in Virginia, US.

Guerra has been known for publicly defending the idea of a traditional family and opposing adoption by same-sex couples. In 2020, she participated in controversial debates regarding social protests, questioning district protocols for intervening in demonstrations and focusing her discourse on the defense and absolute support of law enforcement in the face of the disturbances reported during the protests.

In 2022, Guerra officially resigned from the Liberal Party to join the National Salvation Movement, where she ran as a candidate in the 2026 election and was elected senator. In June 2026, she served as an advisor during Abelardo de la Espriella's presidential campaign.
