= 2002 Colombian parliamentary election =

Congressional elections were held in Colombia on 10 March 2002 to elect the Senate and Chamber of Representatives. The Liberal Party remained the largest party but lost its majority in both houses, winning 56 of the 166 seats in the Chamber and 29 of the 102 seats in the Senate.

== Results ==
=== Senate ===
| Party | Votes | % | Seats | +/– |
|---|---|---|---|---|
| Colombian Liberal Party | 2,710,599 | 29.19 | 29 | –19 |
| Colombian Conservative Party | 885,263 | 9.53 | 13 | –2 |
| Coalition | 565,222 | 6.09 | 6 | –1 |
| National Movement | 411,029 | 4.43 | 6 | – |
| Team Colombia | 297,538 | 3.20 | 4 | – |
| Colombia Always | 255,691 | 2.75 | 2 | – |
| People's Integration Movement | 254,616 | 2.74 | 4 | – |
| Radical Change | 222,484 | 2.40 | 2 | – |
| United People's Movement | 172,717 | 1.86 | 2 | – |
| Renovation Movement Labour Action | 152,481 | 1.64 | 1 | – |
| Social and Political Front | 128,079 | 1.38 | 1 | – |
| New Democratic Force | 124,130 | 1.34 | 1 | 0 |
| National Popular Alliance | 119,022 | 1.28 | 1 | 0 |
| Independent Social Alliance Movement | 103,370 | 1.11 | 1 | 0 |
| Colombian Social Democratic Party | 101,660 | 1.09 | 1 | – |
| Progressive Force | 96,787 | 1.04 | 1 | +1 |
| New Liberalism | 93,987 | 1.01 | 1 | – |
| Citizens' Convergence | 91,131 | 0.98 | 1 | +1 |
| Civic People's Convergence | 85,764 | 0.92 | 1 | 0 |
| Unionist Movement | 85,713 | 0.92 | 1 | – |
| Independent Movement of Absolute Renovation | 81,061 | 0.87 | 1 | – |
| Progressive National Movement | 80,300 | 0.86 | 1 | –1 |
| National Salvation Movement | 78,080 | 0.84 | 1 | 0 |
| Alternative for Social Advance | 77,916 | 0.84 | 1 | – |
| Let the Moreno Play Movement | 71,623 | 0.77 | 1 | – |
| Political Movement for Social Security | 70,704 | 0.76 | 1 | – |
| We are Colombia | 70,699 | 0.76 | 1 | – |
| Vamos Colombia | 66,512 | 0.72 | 1 | 0 |
| C4 | 65,294 | 0.70 | 1 | 0 |
| People's Will Movement | 63,533 | 0.68 | 1 | – |
| Citizens' Footprint Movement | 63,165 | 0.68 | 1 | – |
| Colombian Community and Communal Political Movement | 56,363 | 0.61 | 0 | 0 |
| Yes Colombia | 55,835 | 0.60 | 1 | – |
| Citizens' Movement | 51,504 | 0.55 | 1 | 0 |
| Democratic Unity Party | 48,939 | 0.53 | 1 | – |
| Front of Hope | 46,298 | 0.50 | 1 | 0 |
| Revolutionary Independent Labour Movement | 45,703 | 0.49 | 1 | +1 |
| Independent Civic Movement | 43,265 | 0.47 | 1 | +1 |
| Citizens' Political Movement for Bocaya | 42,954 | 0.46 | 1 | – |
| Democratic Progressivity | 41,672 | 0.45 | 1 | – |
| Christian National Party | 40,460 | 0.44 | 1 | – |
| Laicists for Colombia | 37,125 | 0.40 | 0 | –1 |
| Christian Union Movement | 36,675 | 0.39 | 0 | 0 |
| Indigenous Authorities of Colombia | 35,215 | 0.38 | 1 | +1 |
| Democratic Renovation Movement | 34,049 | 0.37 | 0 | 0 |
| National Union for Social Security | 29,430 | 0.32 | 0 | – |
| Community Participation | 28,319 | 0.30 | 0 | – |
| Colombia My Country | 23,770 | 0.26 | 0 | –1 |
| Democratic Alternative Movement | 23,271 | 0.25 | 0 | 0 |
| National Civic Concentration | 21,191 | 0.23 | 0 | 0 |
| Independent Conservatism | 20,503 | 0.22 | 0 | –1 |
| Humbertista Movement | 19,868 | 0.21 | 0 | 0 |
| ANUPAC | 13,387 | 0.14 | 0 | – |
| National Democratic Reconstruction | 12,693 | 0.14 | 0 | –1 |
| Civic Defence Movement | 12,015 | 0.13 | 0 | –2 |
| Social Democratic Party | 11,279 | 0.12 | 0 | 0 |
| Colombian Indigenous Party | 11,266 | 0.12 | 0 | New |
| Autonomous Citizens' Movement | 6,845 | 0.07 | 0 | – |
| People's Participation Movement | 6,762 | 0.07 | 0 | 0 |
| Force Colombia | 4,707 | 0.05 | 0 | 0 |
| Democratic Revolution Movement | 3,899 | 0.04 | 0 | – |
| Independent Liberal Restoration Movement | 1,442 | 0.02 | 0 | 0 |
| Colombian People's Party | 1,400 | 0.02 | 0 | –1 |
| Others | 217,161 | 2.34 | 2 | – |
| Blank votes | 454,740 | 4.90 | – | – |
| Total | 9,286,175 | 100.00 | 102 | 0 |
| Valid votes | 9,286,175 | 90.18 | | |
| Invalid votes | 1,011,228 | 9.82 | | |
| Total votes | 10,297,403 | 100.00 | | |
| Registered voters/turnout | 23,998,685 | 42.91 | | |
Source: Nohlen

=== Chamber of Representatives ===
| Party | Votes | % | Seats | +/– |
|---|---|---|---|---|
| Colombian Liberal Party | 2,737,320 | 28.42 | 56 | –28 |
| Colombian Conservative Party | 981,983 | 10.20 | 21 | –7 |
| Radical Change | 372,504 | 3.87 | 7 | – |
| United People's Movement | 219,317 | 2.28 | 3 | – |
| Team Colombia | 208,514 | 2.16 | 4 | – |
| Civic People's Convergence | 193,214 | 2.01 | 4 | +2 |
| Liberal Opening Movement | 175,603 | 1.82 | 5 | +4 |
| National Salvation Movement | 162,452 | 1.69 | 2 | +1 |
| National Movement | 147,015 | 1.53 | 1 | – |
| People's Participation Movement | 123,364 | 1.28 | 2 | +1 |
| Renovation Movement Labour Action | 122,869 | 1.28 | 2 | – |
| New Liberalism | 116,371 | 1.21 | 2 | – |
| Colombia Always | 111,742 | 1.16 | 3 | – |
| People's Integration Movement | 106,624 | 1.11 | 2 | – |
| Regional Integration Movement | 102,002 | 1.06 | 3 | +1 |
| Citizens' Convergence | 91,969 | 0.95 | 2 | +2 |
| People's Will Movement | 91,192 | 0.95 | 2 | – |
| Progressive Force | 88,788 | 0.92 | 2 | –2 |
| Unionist Movement | 88,036 | 0.91 | 2 | – |
| Alternative Way | 85,110 | 0.88 | 1 | – |
| Social and Political Front | 84,143 | 0.87 | 2 | – |
| Indigenous Authorities of Colombia | 76,462 | 0.79 | 1 | +1 |
| C4 | 75,476 | 0.78 | 0 | 0 |
| Democratic Progressivity | 73,397 | 0.76 | 2 | – |
| Vamos Colombia | 67,850 | 0.70 | 1 | +1 |
| Community Participation | 66,372 | 0.69 | 1 | – |
| Independent Conservatism | 61,513 | 0.64 | 1 | –1 |
| Republican Movement | 60,539 | 0.63 | 1 | – |
| National Democratic Reconstruction | 59,645 | 0.62 | 1 | +1 |
| Independent Movement of Absolute Renovation | 55,121 | 0.57 | 0 | – |
| Citizens' Footprint Movement | 50,309 | 0.52 | 2 | – |
| Democratic Alliance M19 | 43,293 | 0.45 | 0 | 0 |
| Serious Civic Movement for Colombia | 42,284 | 0.44 | 1 | 0 |
| Humbertista Movement | 41,106 | 0.43 | 0 | –1 |
| Christian National Party | 39,321 | 0.41 | 1 | 0 |
| Independent Social Alliance Movement | 38,853 | 0.40 | 0 | –2 |
| Democratic Unity Party | 38,096 | 0.40 | 1 | – |
| Colombian Community and Communal Political Movement | 37,595 | 0.39 | 2 | +2 |
| Revolutionary Independent Labour Movement | 34,475 | 0.36 | 0 | 0 |
| Christian Union Movement | 32,831 | 0.34 | 0 | 0 |
| UNAMONOS | 30,448 | 0.32 | 0 | – |
| Colombia Unite | 29,879 | 0.31 | 1 | – |
| Progressive National Movement | 28,273 | 0.29 | 1 | 0 |
| New Democratic Force | 25,978 | 0.27 | 1 | –1 |
| Laicists for Colombia | 24,884 | 0.26 | 0 | 0 |
| Yes Colombia | 23,199 | 0.24 | 0 | New |
| New Colombia Movement | 22,552 | 0.23 | 0 | –1 |
| Independent Civic Movement | 22,157 | 0.23 | 0 | –1 |
| Democratic Renovation Movement | 21,991 | 0.23 | 0 | 0 |
| Social Democratic Party | 21,805 | 0.23 | 0 | – |
| We are Colombia | 21,681 | 0.23 | 0 | New |
| Colombian People's Party | 21,063 | 0.22 | 1 | +1 |
| Citizens' Movement | 20,503 | 0.21 | 0 | –1 |
| National Popular Alliance | 19,945 | 0.21 | 0 | 0 |
| MPPSS | 19,244 | 0.20 | 0 | – |
| Civic Defence Movement | 17,594 | 0.18 | 0 | 0 |
| Colombian Social Democratic Party | 16,802 | 0.17 | 1 | – |
| GOLPE | 16,603 | 0.17 | 0 | – |
| National Civic Concentration | 13,967 | 0.15 | 0 | 0 |
| Oxygen Green Party | 11,438 | 0.12 | 0 | – |
| Colombian Indigenous Party | 11,097 | 0.12 | 0 | – |
| National Transformation Movement | 10,222 | 0.11 | 0 | – |
| Democratic Alternative Movement | 7,779 | 0.08 | 0 | –1 |
| Civic Autonomy Movement | 6,581 | 0.07 | 0 | – |
| ANUPAC | 6,341 | 0.07 | 0 | – |
| Social Virage Party | 2,968 | 0.03 | 0 | – |
| Democratic Revolution | 2,221 | 0.02 | 0 | – |
| Citizens for Boyaca | 2,093 | 0.02 | 0 | – |
| Force Colombia | 1,448 | 0.02 | 0 | 0 |
| Patriotic Union | 1,185 | 0.01 | 0 | – |
| Colombia My Country | 1,180 | 0.01 | 0 | 0 |
| 19th of April Movement | 688 | 0.01 | 0 | 0 |
| Coalitions | 894,235 | 9.28 | 17 | +1 |
| Others | 316,001 | 3.28 | 1 | – |
| Blank votes | 532,574 | 5.53 | – | – |
| Total | 9,631,289 | 100.00 | 166 | +5 |
| Valid votes | 9,631,289 | 91.91 | | |
| Invalid votes | 848,096 | 8.09 | | |
| Total votes | 10,479,385 | 100.00 | | |
| Registered voters/turnout | 23,998,685 | 43.67 | | |
Source: Election Passport (votes), CLEA (seats)
