= List of National Junior College alumni =

The following is a list of notable alumni from National Junior College (NJC).

== Politics ==
- Anthea Ong (1985-1986), Former Nominated Member of Parliament (NMP), Founder of numerous social organisations
- Balaji Sadasivan (1972–1973), Senior Minister of State for Foreign Affairs and Information, Communication and the Arts
- Chen Show Mao (1978-1980), Former Member of Parliament for the Aljunied GRC (Paya Lebar)
- Edward Chia, Member of Parliament for Holland-Bukit Timah GRC, Founder of Timber
- Gan Kim Yong (1976-1977), Deputy Prime Minister and Minister for Trade and Industry
- Ho Peng Kee (1971-1972), Former Senior Minister of State for Law and Home Affairs
- Hri Kumar Nair (1983-1984), Former Member of Parliament for Bishan-Toa Payoh GRC
- Lam Pin Min (1986-1987), Former Member of Parliament for Sengkang West SMC
- Lee Hsien Loong (1969–1970), Senior Minister of Singapore, third Prime Minister of Singapore
- Lim Swee Say (1971–1972), Former Minister for Manpower; People's Action Party (PAP) Whip; Former Secretary-General of the National Trades Union Congress
- Masagos Zulkifli (1982-1983), Minister for Social and Family Development; Second Minister for Health; Minister-in-charge of Muslim Affairs; PAP Vice-Chairman
- Matthias Yao (1973-1974), Deputy Speaker of Parliament; Former Mayor of the South East District; Former Member of Parliament for MacPherson
- Ng Eng Hen (1975-1976), Minister for Defence
- Ong Soh Khim (1987-1988), Former NMP
- S. Iswaran (1979-1980), Former Minister for Transport
- Sylvia Lim (1982-1983), Member of Parliament for the Aljunied GRC; Chairman of Workers' Party
- Vivian Balakrishnan (1979–1980), Minister for Foreign Affairs
- Tan See Leng (1982-1983), Minister for Manpower; Second Minister for Trade and Industry
- Zhulkarnain Abdul Rahim, Member of Parliament for Choa Chu Kang GRC (Keat Hong)

== Civil and legal ==
- Davinder Singh (1974-1975), Former CEO of Singapore law firm Drew & Napier; Former Member of Parliament for Toa Payoh GRC, and Bishan-Toa Payoh GRC
- Lawrence Khong (1969-1970), Senior Pastor of Faith Community Baptist Church
- Melvyn Ong (1993-1994), Lieutenant-General, Chief of Defence Force (Singapore)

== Academic, business and corporate ==
- Ho Ching (1970-1971), CEO and executive director of Temasek Holdings; Forbes' 30th "Most Powerful Women in Business" as of 2020
- Lee Hsien Yang (1975-1976), Former president and CEO of SingTel; Current Non-Executive Director and Chairman-Designate of Fraser and Neave Limited
- Tan Huay Cheem (1979-1980), Director and Senior Consultant Cardiologist at National University Heart Centre, President of the Singapore Heart Foundation

== Media and entertainment ==
- Claire Wong, Actress and director
- Eelyn Kok (1995-1996), Mediacorp actress
- Elvin Ng (1997-1998), Mediacorp actor and artist, model
- Jeanette Aw (1996-1997), Mediacorp actress
- Jean Tay (1991-1992), Playwright
- Namiko Chan Takahashi (1991-1992), Contemporary artist
- Tung Soo Hua (1991-1992), Mediacorp newscaster

== Others ==
- Dickson Yeo (1998-1999), Singaporean spy for the People's Republic of China
