= Héctor Helí Rojas Jiménez =

Colombian lawyer and politician

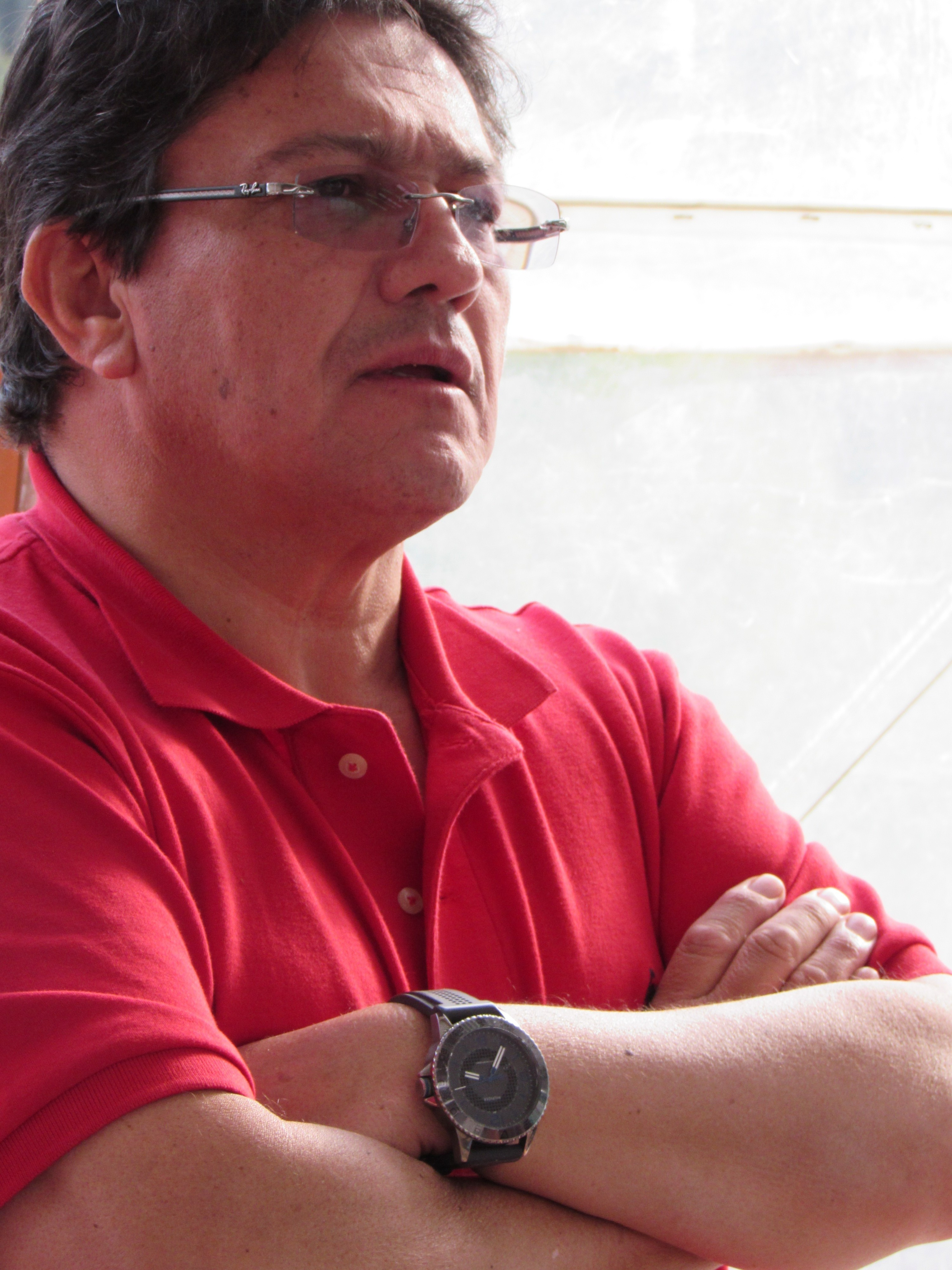

Senator of Colombia
- In office 20 July 1994 – 19 July 2010 Serving with Hugo Orlando Velásquez Jaramillo

Member of the Chamber of Representatives
- In office 20 July 1986 – 1990
- Constituency: Boyacá

Personal details
- Born: 2 July 1954 (age 72) Cómbita, Boyacá, Colombia
- Party: Colombian Liberal Party
- Education: Externado University of Colombia
- Occupation: Lawyer
- Website: Official page Twitter

Héctor Helí Rojas Jiménez (born 2 July 1954 in Cómbita, Boyacá) is a Colombian lawyer and politician. A member of the Colombian Liberal Party, he has served in both the Senate and the Chamber of Representatives of Colombia. He participated in the Liberal Party primary for the 2010 Colombian presidential election. He was later elected as Andean Parliamentarian for the 2010–2014 term.

== Professional career ==
Rojas Jiménez studied law at the Externado University of Colombia, with specializations in Comparative Constitutional Law at the same university and Administrative Law at Universidad del Rosario. He later obtained a Master's degree in Economics and Political Science from the Institute for Advanced Studies in Development.

He was elected to the Chamber of Representatives of Colombia in 1986 representing Boyacá for the Liberal Party, and re-elected in 1990. In 1994, he was elected to the Senate of Colombia and re-elected in 1998 and 2006.

He served as spokesman for the Liberal Party in the First Committee of the Senate, focusing on constitutional matters. In May 2007, he was appointed president of the Bogotá Liberal Directorate. On 18 June 2007, he became the Senate Liberal Caucus spokesman, succeeding Juan Fernando Cristo, and was later succeeded by Cecilia López Montaño. He has taught at several universities, including Universidad Libre, Universidad de los Andes, Universidad Antonio Nariño, Universidad Cooperativa de Colombia, and Universidad Militar Nueva Granada.

== Congressional service ==
Rojas Jiménez was elected to the Senate in the 1994 Colombian legislative election and re-elected in 1998, 2002, and 2006, receiving 45,533, 49,784, and 48,541 votes respectively.

He was also elected to the Chamber of Representatives in the 1986 Colombian legislative election.

As a congressman, he supported territorial, disciplinary, and cultural reforms. He contributed to drafting the Disciplinary Code, Horizontal Property Law, and the Congressional Code of Ethics. He opposed a proposed reform to impose life imprisonment for child rapists and murderers, stating his belief in rehabilitation over retribution, a position supported by Senator Gina Parody and President Álvaro Uribe.

In December 2007, he was voted "Best Senator of the Year" by his peers, as recognized by RCN Channel.

On 29 April 2009, he unexpectedly announced his candidacy for the Liberal Party's presidential nomination.

=== Legislative initiatives ===
- Public hiring reform to ensure merit-based appointments (Declared unconstitutional).

=== Political affiliation ===
Throughout his career, he represented the following party:

Political party	Start date	End date
Colombian Liberal Party	20 July 1998	

=== Public offices held ===
Héctor Helí Rojas Jiménez has held the following public offices:

Public office	Political party	Start date	End date
Senator of Colombia	Colombian Liberal Party	20 July 2002	19 July 2006
Senator of Colombia	Colombian Liberal Party	20 July 1998	19 July 2002
Senator of Colombia	–	20 July 1994	19 July 1998

== See also ==
- Congress of Colombia
- Senate of Colombia
- Chamber of Representatives of Colombia
