= 1986 Colombian presidential election =

- 25 May 1986
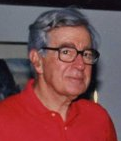

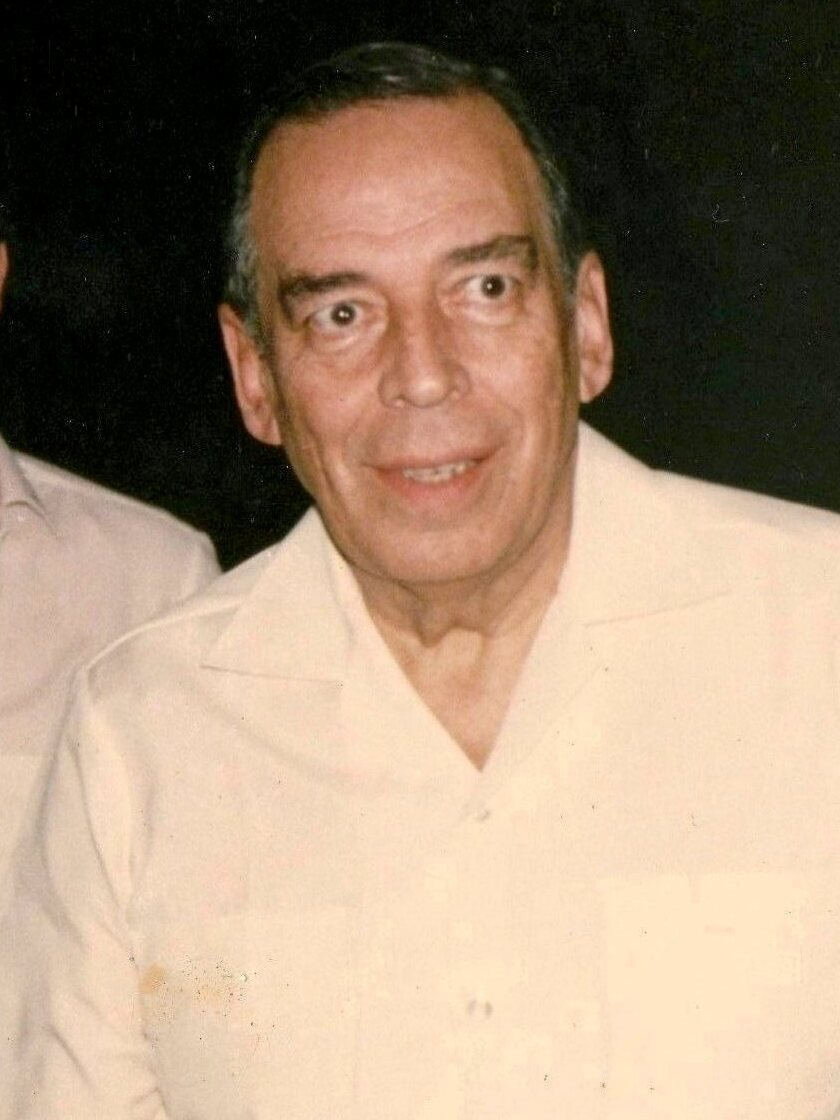
Nominee	Virgilio Barco Vargas	Álvaro Gómez Hurtado
Party	Liberal	Conservative
Popular vote	4,214,510	2,588,050
Percentage	58.36%	35.84%
- Results by department
President before election
Belisario Betancur
Conservative
Elected President
Virgilio Barco Vargas
Liberal

Presidential elections were held in Colombia on 25 May 1986. The result was a victory for Virgilio Barco Vargas of the Liberal Party, who received 58% of the vote.

Barco Vargas' campaign promised land reform and economic revitalization, including jobs and housing for the poor. One of the issues in the campaign was the ongoing negotiations with Colombian guerilla groups.

The elections took place shortly after the March 1986 parliamentary elections, in which Barco Vargas' Liberal Party won a majority of seats.

== Electoral system ==
The elections were held using first-past-the-post voting and were the first in which the electoral commission counted blank votes as valid votes.

== Results ==
Candidate	Party	Votes	%
Virgilio Barco Vargas	Colombian Liberal Party	4,214,510	58.36
Álvaro Gómez Hurtado	Conservative Party–National Participation Movement	2,588,050	35.84
Jaime Pardo Leal	Patriotic Union	328,752	4.55
Regina Betancur de Liska	Metapolitical Unitary Movement	46,811	0.65
Juan David Pérez Gaviria	Humanist Party	229	0.00
Write-ins		1,261	0.02
Blank votes		42,205	0.58
Total		7,221,818	100.00
Valid votes		7,221,818	99.89
Invalid votes		8,119	0.11
Total votes		7,229,937	100.00
Registered voters/turnout		15,839,754	45.64
Source: Nohlen
