= 1978 Colombian presidential election =

- 4 June 1978
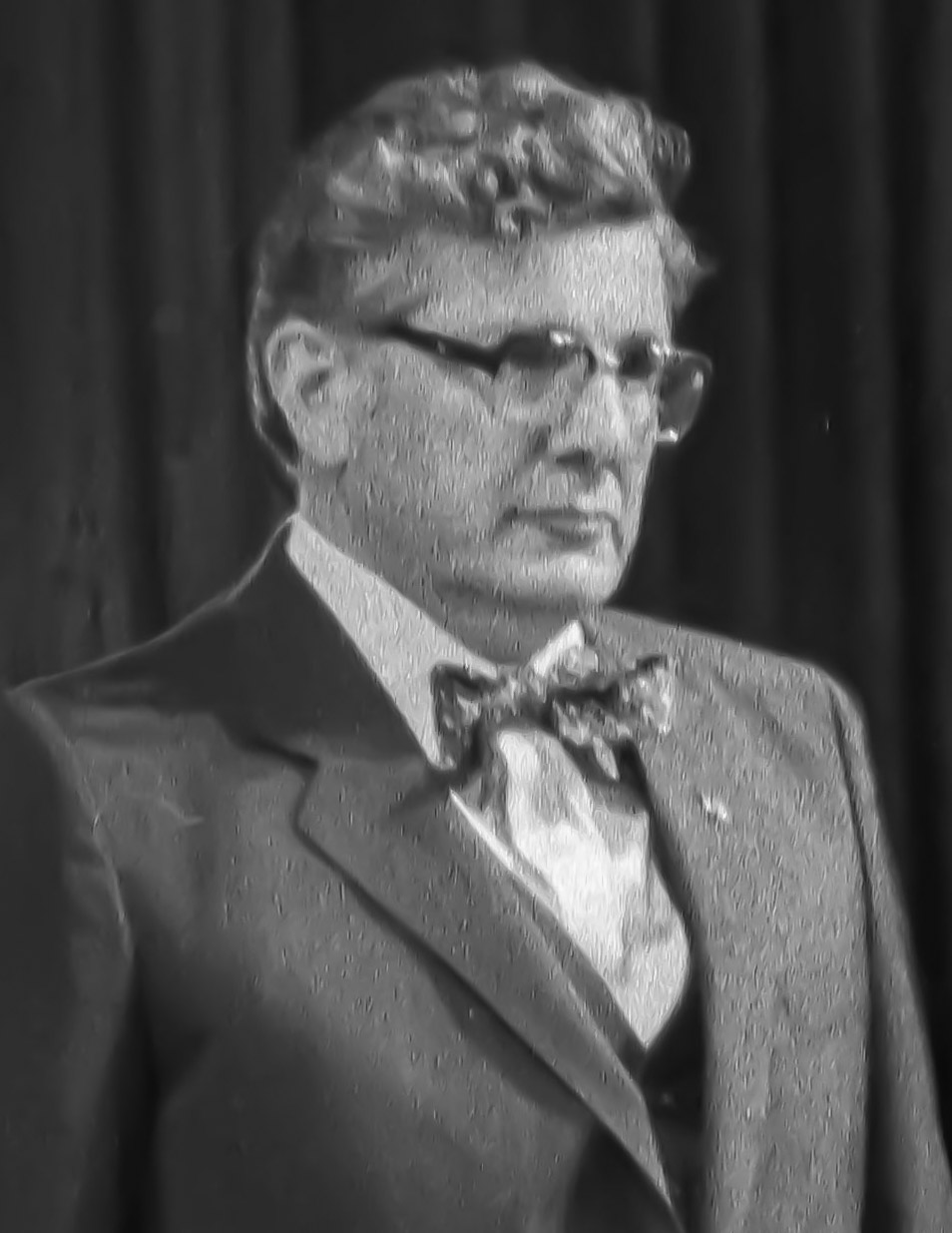

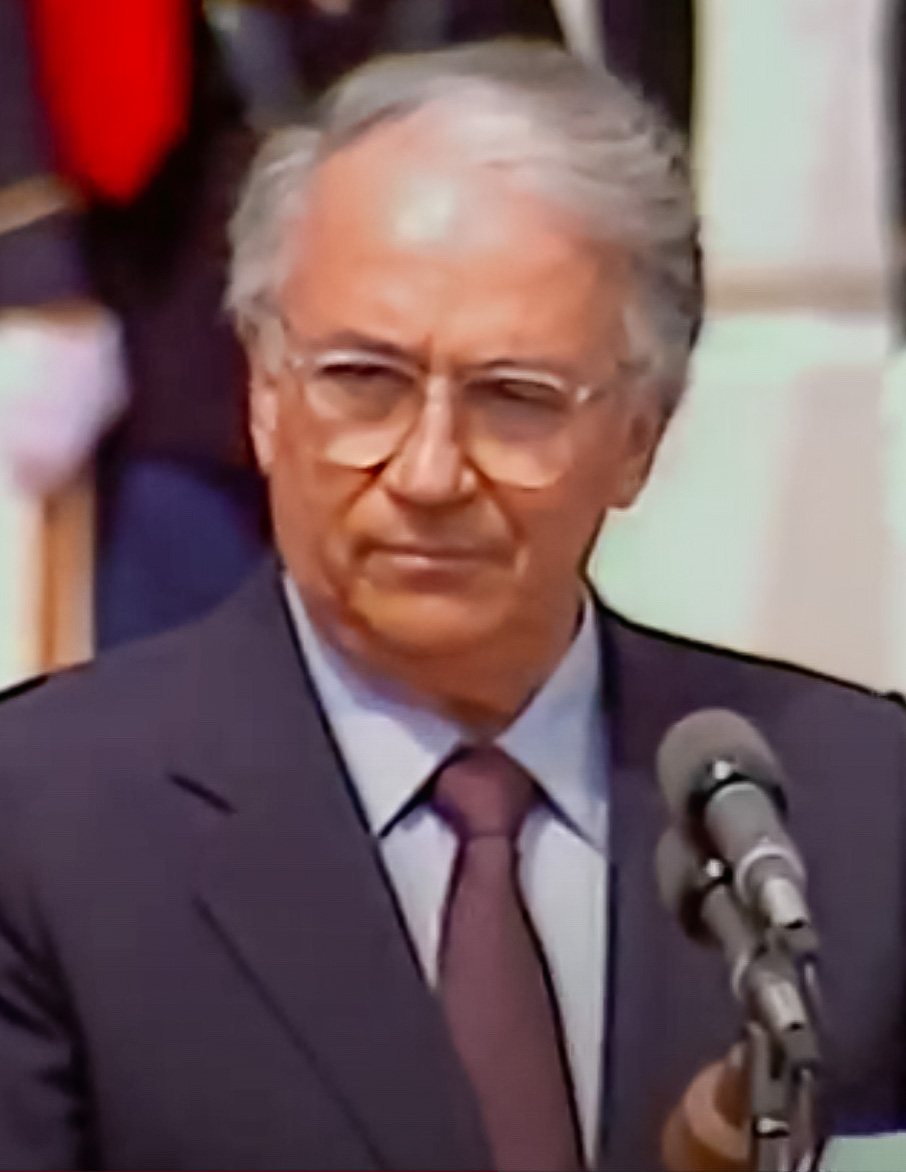
Nominee	Julio César Turbay	Belisario Betancur
Party	Liberal	Conservative
Home state	Bogotá	Antioquia
Popular vote	2,503,681	2,356,620
Percentage	49.50%	46.59%
- Results by department
President before election
Alfonso López Michelsen
Liberal
Elected President
Julio César Turbay Ayala
Liberal

Presidential elections were held in Colombia on 4 June 1978. The result was a victory for Julio César Turbay Ayala of the Liberal Party, who received 50% of the vote.

== Results ==
Candidate	Party	Votes	%
Julio César Turbay Ayala	Colombian Liberal Party	2,503,681	49.50
Belisario Betancur	Colombian Conservative Party–National Movement	2,356,620	46.59
Julio César Pernía	National Opposition Union	97,234	1.92
Álvaro Valencia Tovar	National Renovation Movement	65,961	1.30
Jaime Piedrahíta Cardona	People's Unity Front	27,059	0.53
Luz del Socorro Ramírez	Labour and Socialist Union	6,643	0.13
Victor Julio Gómez Hoyos	National Civic Action Movement	587	0.01
Regina Betancur de Liska	Reginista Unitary Movement	126	0.00
Jesús Arena Fajardo	Labour Movement	14	0.00
Total		5,057,925	100.00
Valid votes		5,057,925	99.65
Invalid/blank votes		17,794	0.35
Total votes		5,075,719	100.00
Registered voters/turnout		12,580,851	40.34
Source: Nohlen
