= Faith Community Baptist Church =

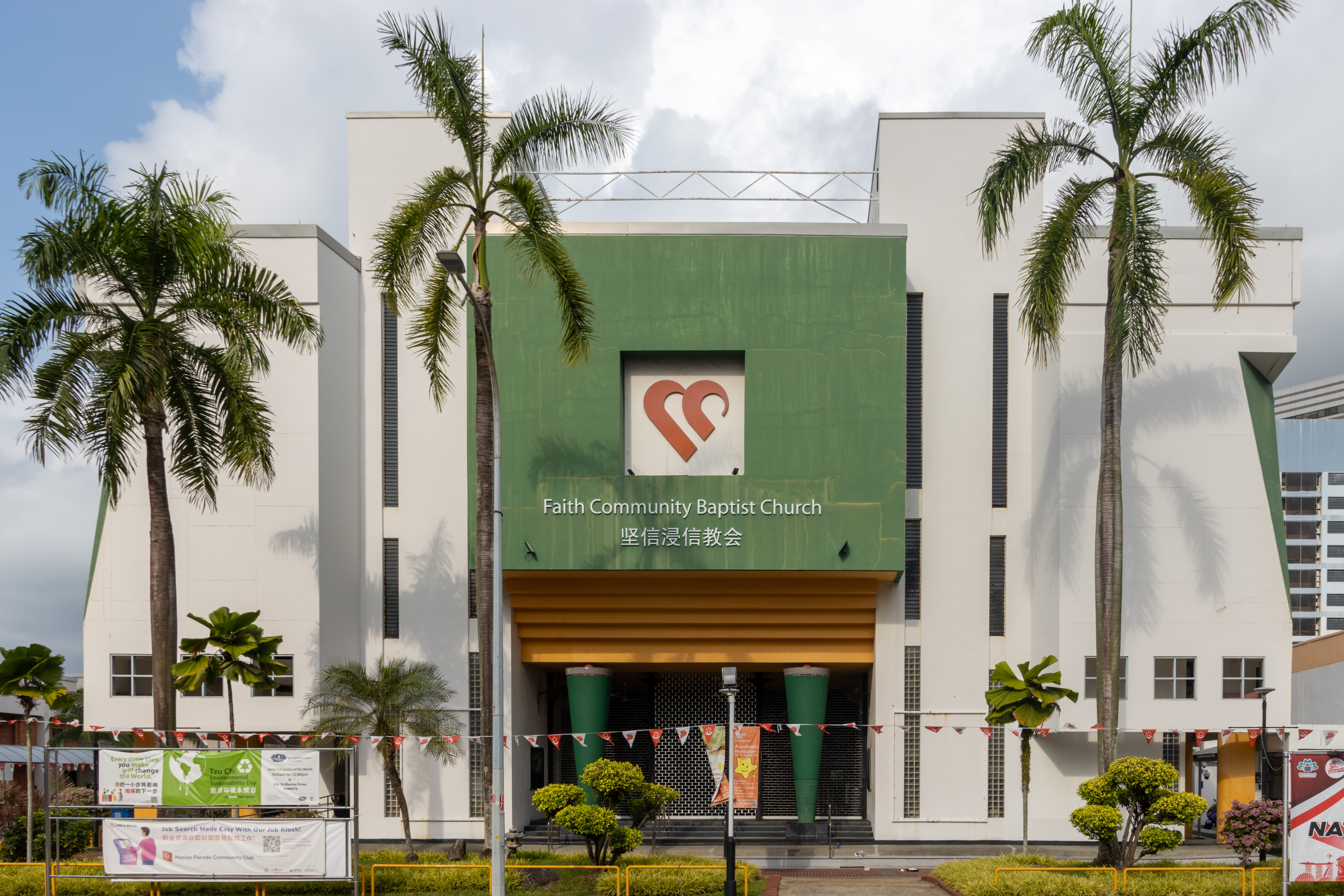
- Faith Community Baptist Church
- Country: Singapore
- Denomination: Charismatic Christianity / Pentecostalism/Nondenominational Christianity
- Website: www.fcbc.org.sg

History
- Founded: 1986
- Founder: Lawrence Khong

Faith Community Baptist Church (Chinese: 坚信浸信教会), or FCBC, is an independent charismatic megachurch in Singapore founded by Pastor Lawrence Khong in 1986.

The church was one of three megachurches to make it to a list of Singapore's 10 largest charities, according to a report by The Straits Times in 2019.

== History ==
FCBC was founded in 1986 following the sacking of Pastor Lawrence Khong from the mainline Grace Baptist Church over theological differences on practices such as baptism in the Holy Spirit and speaking in tongues in the early days of the charismatic movement in Singapore.

It became a cell group church in 1988 and has since 2002 transitioned to become a Government of 12 or "G12" church, a model first formulated by Colombian pastor César Castellanos of the International Charismatic Mission Church.

After years of conducting worship services in commercial venues, the church opened its first place of worship in 1993, with the launch of the 1,600-seat Touch Centre in Marine Parade. Four years later, it opened a second place of worship with the opening of Touch Community Theatre in Redhill.

In 2019, Daniel Khong, son of Lawrence Khong was installed as the senior pastor of the church. His wife, Serene Tang was named deputy senior pastor.

Lawrence Khong and his wife Nina Khong remain active within the church as "Apostolic Overseers".

== Ministries ==
FCBC conducts multiple services at two locations: Touch Centre in Marine Parade and Nicoll meeting rooms 1–3 in Suntec Singapore Convention and Exhibition Centre under a lease agreement.

FCBC has a community arm, TOUCH Community Services (TCS). TCS serves the local community in Singapore in a variety of ways, including providing various services and help to troubled youth, children, senior citizens, the visually challenged, mentally challenged, physically disabled, family services and in character development. TCS also has an international arm, TOUCH International (TI), that provides aid and relief to disaster spots and areas that need help around the world. TI also supports long-term involvement in global communities and is deeply involved in the rebuilding process in the tsunami stricken areas and others. TCS is a non-profit, non-religious community organisation, which has served over 100,000 individuals since its establishment. In 2007, TCS won the Outstanding non-profit Organisation Award.

FCBC also has a media branch known as Gateway Entertainment that produces various movies and stage productions which teach moral values and Christianity. Its pioneering magic & theatre show, The Magic of Love (MOL), toured the United States. As of 2007, over 208,000 people worldwide had watched the show. Gateway's second show, titled "MAGICBOX", performed at The Esplanade Theatre in July 2008. Gateway's latest production, "Vision", performed at the same venue in July 2011.

Reverend Khong was appointed as the Singapore Coordinator of VISION 2001 in 1994, which was renamed as the LOVESingapore Movement in 1995, a Unity movement among the churches in Singapore. There are over 150 churches in this movement united in prayer for Singapore. Other major churches involved include Victory Family Centre and Covenant Evangelical Free Church.

== Controversies ==
=== Views on homosexuality ===
In January 2013, church founder Lawrence Khong issued a statement to ex-Prime Minister Goh Chok Tong against repealing Singapore's laws that criminalises gay sex. He described the potential repeal of Section 377A of the Penal Code as "a looming threat to this basic (nation) building block by homosexual activists." and regards the "homosexual act" as "the greatest blasphemy against the name of God".

In 2014, LoveSingapore, a network of 100 local churches that Khong chairs, created a guide to support Section 377A of the Penal Code, criminalising sex between men. He also wrote an open letter to the Health Promotion Board, criticising that their webpage on sexual health "condones same-sex relationships and promotes homosexual practice as something normal". He has also actively protested against the annual Singapore gay pride event Pink Dot SG, and has supported the counter-campaign and encouraged his followers to speak out against the normalisation of homosexual relationships in Singapore.

=== Support for Creationism ===
In 2016, Lawrence Khong delivered a series of sermons at Faith Community Baptist Church, describing Charles Darwin's Theory of Evolution as "a real deception from the Devil". The church's support for creationism in its pulpit and on its social media channels prompted a discussion on the spread of the idea by certain groups of Christian evangelicals in secular Singapore. The Ministry of Education has since clarified that creationism is not taught in local schools.

=== Unfair dismissal of employee ===
In August 2013, FCBC was fined by the Ministry of Manpower and made to compensate a former staff whose employment was terminated 7 months into her pregnancy, depriving her of wages and maternity benefits. The married woman had been dismissed after she was discovered to be pregnant with the child of another former male staff. Employment Act in Singapore protects an expectant mother from the fourth month of pregnancy and requires employers to pay maternity benefits if she is dismissed without sufficient cause during this period. Reverend Khong disagreed with the ministry's judgement, but the ministry said that "employment legislation has to be kept secular because of Singapore's multi-cultural and multi-religious society."

In October 2013, the church announced plans to file papers requesting a judicial review of the original judgement, believing the ministry had acted unconstitutionally in the way it interfered in the church's affairs. The ministry expressed disappointment, saying that "We live in a secular society where laws have been put in place to protect individuals while not depriving religious organisations and individuals of the space to carry out their practices."
