= 1994 Colombian parliamentary election =

Parliamentary elections were held in Colombia on 13 March 1994 to elect the Senate and Chamber of Representatives. The result was a victory for the Liberal Party, which won 88 of the 163 seats in the Chamber and 56 of the 102 seats in the Senate.

== Results ==
=== Senate ===
Party	Votes	%	Seats	+/–
Colombian Liberal Party	2,648,731	50.74	56	0
Colombian Conservative Party	979,097	18.76	20	+11
19th of April Movement	140,819	2.70	0	–9
National Salvation Movement	100,385	1.92	2	–3
Christian Union Movement	58,857	1.13	1	0
C4	52,748	1.01	1	New
Laicists for Colombia	51,177	0.98	1	0
Colombian Communist Party	51,032	0.98	1	New
National Popular Alliance	49,732	0.95	1	New
New Colombia Movement	45,783	0.88	1	+1
Independent Liberal Restoration Movement	45,732	0.88	1	0
Indigenous Authorities of Colombia	40,779	0.78	1	0
Progressive National Movement	40,085	0.77	1	0
Independent Social Alliance Movement	36,626	0.70	0	–1
Unique Movement of Conservative Renovation	31,589	0.61	1	+1
Independent Civic Movement	31,455	0.60	1	+1
Conservative National Movement	31,304	0.60	1	0
Metapolitical Unitary Movement	27,082	0.52	1	0
Independent Conservatism	26,341	0.50	1	0
Christian National Party	21,325	0.41	0	–1
Democratic Renovation Movement	19,640	0.38	0	0
Democratic Alternative Movement	18,501	0.35	0	New
Indigenous Community	14,245	0.27	1	New
National Civic Concentration	4,326	0.08	0	New
Coalitions	79,553	1.52	2	+2
Others	424,882	8.14	7	–
Blank votes	148,307	2.84	–	–
Total	5,220,133	100.00	102	0
Valid votes	5,220,133	93.78		
Invalid votes	346,274	6.22		
Total votes	5,566,407	100.00		
Registered voters/turnout	17,028,961	32.69		
Source: Barrero et al.

=== Chamber of Representatives ===
Party	Votes	%	Seats	+/–
Colombian Liberal Party	2,621,201	49.53	88	+1
Colombian Conservative Party	1,099,436	20.77	40	+13
19th of April Movement	153,185	2.89	1	–12
Conservative National Movement	103,899	1.96	6	+2
Progressive Force	77,767	1.47	4	+4
New Colombia Movement	76,843	1.45	2	+1
Laicists for Colombia	60,968	1.15	0	0
C4	60,834	1.15	0	New
National Salvation Movement	51,446	0.97	1	–10
Christian Union Movement	40,324	0.76	0	–1
Patriotic Union	39,891	0.75	0	–3
Independent Conservatism	39,116	0.74	1	+1
Metropolitan Unitary Movement	35,020	0.66	1	0
Progressive National Movement	29,686	0.56	1	+1
Christian National Party	26,881	0.51	1	+1
Independent Liberal Restoration Movement	17,097	0.32	0	–1
Unique Movement of Conservative Renovation	15,869	0.30	1	0
Independent Social Alliance Movement	10,743	0.20	0	0
Democratic Alternative Movement	10,096	0.19	0	New
National Popular Alliance	6,721	0.13	0	New
Indigenous Authorities of Colombia	6,048	0.11	0	–1
Democratic Renovation Movement	5,761	0.11	0	–1
Regional Integration Movement	4,338	0.08	1	0
Independent Civic Movement	4,294	0.08	0	–1
National Civic Concentration	124	0.00	0	New
Black communities constituency	131,207	2.48	2	New
Coalitions	43,927	0.83	1	0
Others	324,734	6.14	12	–
Blank votes	194,968	3.68	–	–
Total	5,292,424	100.00	163	+2
Valid votes	5,292,424	94.91		
Invalid votes	283,750	5.09		
Total votes	5,576,174	100.00		
Registered voters/turnout	17,028,961	32.75		
Source: Barrero et al.
