= Democratic Unity Party =

Democratic Unity Party may refer to:

- Democratic Unity Party (Colombia)
- Democratic United Party (South Korea)
