= Luis Francisco Cuéllar =

Colombian politician (1940–2009)

Luis Francisco Cuéllar Carvajal

Governor of Caquetá
- In office January 1, 2008 – December 22, 2009
- Preceded by: Olga Patricia Vega Cedeño
- Succeeded by: Olga Patricia Vega Cedeño

Deputy of Caqueta
- In office 2000–2003

Mayor of Morelia
- In office 1996–1998

Personal details
- Born: December 22, 1940 Timaná, Huila
- Died: December 22, 2009 (aged 69) Caquetá
- Manner of death: Assassination
- Party: Indigenous Social Alliance Movement
- Other political affiliations: Colombian People's Party (2003)
- Spouse: Imelda Galindo de Cuéllar
- Children: Luis Fernando Cuellar
- Occupation: Cattle rancher, politician

Luis Francisco Cuéllar Carvajal (December 22, 1940 – December 22, 2009) was a Colombian politician, serving as Mayor of Morelia, Governor of the Caquetá Department from 2008 to 2009, and Deputy Governor of Caqueta from 2000 to 2003. He is known for being kidnapped and murdered by the Revolutionary Armed Forces of Colombia, and for being kidnapped and held for ransom four times.

== Biography ==
Cuellar was born in Timaná, Huila, Colombia on December 22, 1940. Prior to his political career, he worked as a cattle rancher. He married Imelda Galindo de Cuéllar in 1968, and the couple stayed together until his death. Cuellar was a Roman Catholic.

== Political career ==
Cuéllar served as deputy of the department of Caquetá from 2000 to 2003, and governor from January 1, 2008, until his murder on December 22, 2009. He also served as the mayor of Morelia from 1996 to 1998. In 1997, he related his experiences as a hostage and met relatives of hostages being held by FARC. He was a member in the Indigenous Social Alliance Movement and the Colombian People's Party. During his term as governor, he established the Cuellar Public Health Laboratory in Florencia. He also ordered a variety of internationally made sports facilities for Caqueta schools.

== Last kidnapping and death ==
Cuéllar was kidnapped on December 21, 2009. The Cuéllar family claims to have been under threat prior to the kidnapping. His home in Florencia was raided by 8 to 10 gunmen, who killed a police guard and used explosives to blow open the front door of the building, wounding two other police guards. The gunmen then entered the building and seized Cuéllar. Colombian authorities began a large-scale manhunt, deploying 2,000 soldiers and police officers into the jungle highlands surrounding Florencia to search for him. President Álvaro Uribe offered 1 billion pesos (approximately €340,000, US$490,000) to anyone providing information leading to his safe return. On December 22, 2009, his body was recovered by security forces near Florencia, after local villagers led troops to it. The burnt pickup truck used by the gunmen was discovered by police with nine explosive charges. Cuéllar's throat had been slit. Colombian authorities began an investigation into the murder, and offered 1 billion pesos for information leading to the killers.

Although no group immediately claimed responsibility for the kidnapping, President Uribe blamed the FARC. The FARC later claimed responsibility, but claimed that they had not intended to execute him, but wanted to subject him to a "political trial" for what they claimed was corruption. President Uribe sharply criticized the FARC for these statements, and called them an attempt to justify Cuellar's murder. His wife, Imelda, stated that "He didn't deserve that. He was a very generous man; he loved to be with humble people," and added that she and her husband had spent 41 "wonderful" years together. Human rights organization Amnesty International also condemned the murder. In January 2010, Henry Lopez Sarmiento, the FARC commander suspected of masterminding Cuellar's kidnapping, was detained by Colombian authorities, and was charged with abduction and murder.

After his death, his wife said he had previously been kidnapped four other times.
