= Pentecostal Presbyterian Church =

Brazilian church

- Classification: Protestant
- Orientation: Pentecostal
- Theology: Evangelical
- Region: Brazil and Spain
- Origin: 1974
- Separated from: Presbyterian Church of Brazil
- Official website: presbiterianapentecostal.com.br

The Pentecostal Presbyterian Church (in Portuguese Igreja Presbiteriana Pentecostal or IPP) is a denomination of orientation Pentecostal, founded on November 18, 1974, in Campos dos Goytacazes, Rio de Janeiro from a group of dissident members of the Presbyterian Church of Brazil, who adhered to the Pentecostal doctrine of Baptism with the Holy Spirit as a second blessing, after conversion.

The denomination stands out for its political participation. In 2020, one of its pastors, Irlan Melo, was elected Alderman, in the Municipality of Belo Horizonte.

== History ==
The denomination emerged on November 18, 1974, in Campos dos Goytacazes, Rio de Janeiro from a group of members of Presbyterian Church of Brazil claimed to have been baptized by the Holy Spirit, seeking to form a church Pentecostal. As the headquarters church grew, several churches were founded in other locations.

In 1991, the denomination's first church was founded in Belo Horizonte, where the denomination experienced rapid growth.

Other churches were founded in Rio Grande do Norte and São Paulo in the 2000s.

In the 2010s, the denomination spread to other countries, starting to plant churches in Spain.

== Doctrine ==
The denomination adopts the system known as G12 and believes in the modern apostolate, which is completely rejected by traditional Presbyterian denominations and generally adopted by neo-Pentecostal denominations.
