= 1994 Colombian presidential election =

- 29 May 1994 (first round); 19 June 1994 (second round)
- Turnout: 33.95% (first round) ▼9.55pp 43.32% (second round)
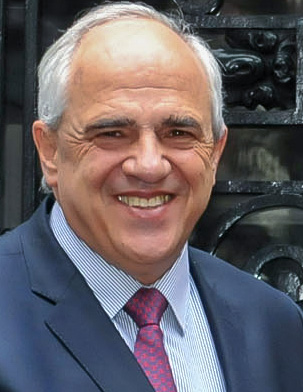

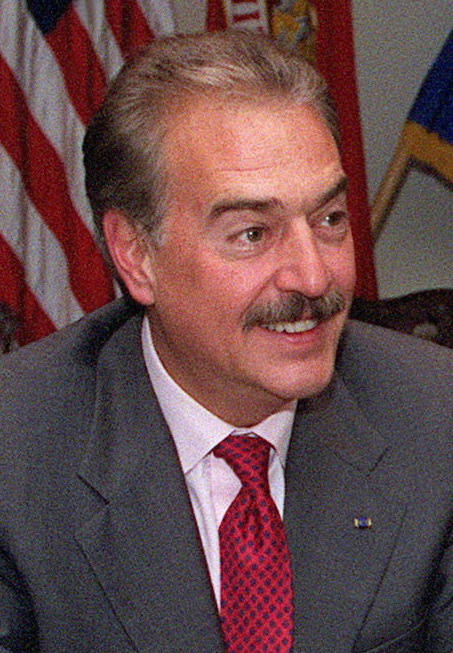
Nominee	Ernesto Samper	Andrés Pastrana Arango
Party	Liberal	Conservative
Running mate	Humberto De la Calle	Luis Fernando Ramírez
Popular vote	3,733,366	3,576,781
Percentage	50.57%	48.45%
President before election
César Gaviria
Liberal
Elected President
Ernesto Samper
Liberal

Presidential elections were held in Colombia on 29 May 1994, with a second round on 19 June. The result was a victory for Ernesto Samper of the Colombian Liberal Party, who received 51% of the vote in the runoff.

Samper's victory was tainted by the Proceso 8000 scandal, involving accusations that the Liberal Party had sought funding from the Cali Cartel during his campaign and afterward. This resulted in an investigation, which found several of Samper's close associates within the party guilty, although Samper himself was absolved of any wrongdoing. However, the scandal badly damaged his and his party's reputation during his presidency and resulted in a coalition of opposition politicians forming to oppose him. This resulted in the defeat of the Liberal Party in the following 1998 presidential election. As of the 2022 presidential election, Samper was Colombia's last Liberal Party president.

== Results ==
Candidate	Running mate	Party	First round		Second round	
Candidate	Running mate	Party	Votes	%	Votes	%
Ernesto Samper	Humberto de La Calle	Colombian Liberal Party	2,623,210	45.30	3,733,336	50.57
Andrés Pastrana	Luis Fernando Ramírez	Colombian Conservative Party	2,604,771	44.98	3,576,781	48.45
Antonio Navarro Wolff	Jesús Piñacué	Colombian Compromise (AD/M-19–ASI)	219,241	3.79		
Regina Betancur		Metapolitical Unitary Movement	64,131	1.11		
Miguel Alfredo Maza Márquez		Civic People's Convergence	55,190	0.95		
Alberto Mendoza Morales		National Convergence–Patriotic Union–PCC	34,437	0.59		
Enrique Parejo González		Democratic Alternative	29,246	0.50		
Guillermo Alemán		Ecological Orientation Movement	22,923	0.40		
Gloria Gaitán		Jorge Eliecer Gaitán Movement	17,397	0.30		
José Antonio Cortes Huertas		Civic and Christian Commitment for the Community	11,704	0.20		
Miguel Zamora Ávila		Let's Protest	9,059	0.16		
José Galat		Moral Front	9,055	0.16		
Doris de Castro		Independent Christian Movement	6,020	0.10		
Luis Rodríguez Orjuela		Progressive National Movement	5,711	0.10		
Oscar Rojas Masso		We are Free	4,368	0.08		
José Guillermo Barnosa Millan		Organisation for National Peace	3,797	0.07		
Mario Diazgranados Llinas		Christian CGT	3,319	0.06		
Efraín Torres Plazas		Believe – No to the War	2,637	0.05		
Blank votes			65,116	1.12	72,536	0.98
Total			5,791,332	100.00	7,382,653	100.00
Valid votes			5,791,332	99.48	7,382,653	99.39
Invalid votes			29,999	0.52	45,089	0.61
Total votes			5,821,331	100.00	7,427,742	100.00
Registered voters/turnout			17,146,597	33.95	17,146,597	43.32
Source: Nohlen, CMPR

== Proceso 8000 ==
The Process 8000 (lit. '8000 Process') is the unofficial name given to the corruption scandal surrounding accusations that Colombian Liberal Party candidate Ernesto Samper's 1994 campaign for President of Colombia was partially funded by drug money. The name came from the case number issued by the Office of the Attorney General for their investigation into the allegations. The investigation formally ended in the mid-1990s. The investigation found several of Samper's close associates to be guilty, although Samper himself was absolved of any wrongdoing.
