= Destiny Church =

Destiny Church may refer to:

- Destiny Church Groningen, a network of churches based in the Netherlands and South America
- Destiny Church (New Zealand), a network of churches based in New Zealand
- Destiny Church (Philippines), a megachurch based in Quezon City, Philippines
