= Destiny Church (Philippines) =

- Country: Philippines
- Denomination: Protestant
- Website: destinychurch.org.ph

History
- Founded: 1998

Destiny Church (formerly as Destiny Church – Manila) is an Evangelical, non-sectarian megachurch that started in Quezon City, Philippines and now has three main services: Destiny North (University of the Philippines Diliman), Destiny Central (Ortigas Center), and Destiny South (Parañaque). It has been headed by Ps. Carlo and Zhaleen Panlilio since 1998.

== History ==
Destiny Church started in 1998 as a prayer meeting held by a student group called Students for Christ within the University of the Philippines Los Baños. From 15 members, it grew to over 300 students. In its first few years, Destiny Church held services in different locations: at the Manor Hotel at Kamias Road, King’s Court, Chicken Bacolod at Quezon Memorial Circle, and Camelot Hotel. In 2001, the Students of Destiny (SOD), the church's campus ministry, was established. It sporadically grew in the University Belt area, establishing itself as an accredited student organization in the different colleges and universities.

Destiny Church adopted the G12 Vision in 2004, and it eventually grew by adopting its cell group structure. By 2009, Destiny Church claims an average weekly attendance of 5,000 people. It has also established satellite churches in Mindanao, Tabaco City in Bicol, and in Pangasinan.

== Ministries ==
The church is composed of various ministry that include the Zero to Twelve Ministry, Students of Destiny, Destiny Professionals, and the Couples and Adults ministry.

=== Students of Destiny ===
Students of Destiny (SOD) is the campus ministry of Destiny Church. It is active in campus evangelism and is focused on interacting with students. In 2016, SOD has formed life groups in 49 different colleges and universities within the metro. The UP Students of Destiny handled one night during the week-long open-air concert series of UP Fair on 2012, 2013 and 2014. Many Christian artist were invited, like Yeng Constantino, Gary Valenciano, Kitchie Nadal, Gloc 9, Quest, to name a few. They were the first Christian organization in UP Diliman to hit such a feat. UP SOD's handling of the UP Fair was notable for having the most sold out tickets and the most peaceful night during the week-long concert.

=== Destiny Professionals ===
Destiny Professionals is the ministry for the working people. It was formerly called as the Destiny Marketplace Radicals. They held Acoustic Night Live, a buffet dinner and music with mainstream guest performer and Destiny's worship team. It encourages young professionals who wanted to excel and make a difference in the community.

== Branches ==
Destiny Church Satellite Churches
| Location | Pastor(s) | Established | Image |
Luzon
| Alaminos, Calasiao, and Dagupan, Pangasinan | Sandy and Lotis Padilla | 2012 | |
| Imus, Cavite | Junewelle and Roshell Gonzales | 2014 | |
| Legazpi and Tabaco, Albay (Bicol) | Kevin and Sheina Dela Cruz | 2015 | |
| Baguio City | Angelo and Louvena Balagtas | 2016 | |
| San Marcelino, Zambales | Daniel and Odette Hugtagalung | 2017 | |
Visayas
| Cebu City and Carcar City, Cebu | James and Kenny Limpiado | 2013 | |
Mindanao
| Butuan City | | 2017 | |
| Davao City and Sta. Cruz, Davao del Sur | Roy and Rochel Oliveros (first incarnation); Michael and Coritha Manubag (second incarnation) | 2011 (first incarnation); 2022 (second incarnation) | |
| General Santos City | Nathaniel and Jamie Sanchez | 2019 | |
| Zamboanga City | Nathan and Lyn Alanano | 2011 | |
Overseas
| Singapore | | 2023 | |

== Criticism ==
Destiny Church was a member of the G12 Movement Philippines from 2004-2016. The church abruptly left the movement amidst the controversy surrounding Pastor Richard Whitmer, pastor of Destiny Christian Church in Yuma, Arizona and spiritual mentor of Pastor Carlo Panlilio. Whitmer accused Oriel Ballano, the head of G12 Philippines Network, of corruption. Overall, the G12 Vision had been criticised because of its financial and/or hierarchical pyramid scheme, teachings of prosperity gospel, and spiritual abuse.
