= People's Integration Movement =

Colombian political party

The People's Integration Movement (Movimiento Integración Popular) is a conservative political party in Colombia.

At the 2002 Colombian parliamentary election, the party won four seats in the Parliament, as one of the many small parties parliamentary representation.
