= Brazil–Colombia border =

International border

Map op the Brazil–Colombia border area

The border between Brazil and Colombia is 1,644.2 km (1,021.7 mi) long. The boundary was delimited in two treaties:

- the Vásquez Cobo-Martins treaty of 1907, establishing the line from the Rio Negro northwestward along the Amazon River-Orinoco watershed divide, "then generally southward along various river courses and straight-line segments to the mouth of the Apaporis River", and
- the Tratado de Límites y Navegación Fluvial of 1928, delimiting the Apaporis-Amazon segment of the boundary as a "geodesic line identical to its Brazilian-Peruvian antecedent after Colombia gained undisputed sovereignty over the area".

== History ==
The Spanish Empire claimed jurisdiction over the New World in the Caribbean and North and South America, including the area once became the new Spanish colony of New Granada that is now Colombia. With the Treaty of Tordesillas divided the New World between Spain and Portugal, the Portuguese had gained control of the eastern coast of South America, which is now Brazil which connects and linked to the African coast of Portuguese West Africa (present day Angola) as part of the Portuguese Empire. The city of Rio de Janeiro was founded in 1565 by the Portuguese and was initially the seat of the Captaincy of Rio de Janeiro which took tens of thousands of African slaves from the city of São Paulo da Assunção de Loanda and shipped them to the New World of Rio de Janeiro. New Granada had declared independence from Spain on 20 July 1810, Colombia became the first South American country to achieve freedom from Spanish colonial rule as well as the third oldest independent country of Latin America after Haiti and the United States. On 8 September 1822, Brazil had gained independence from Portugal after it was formed by the United Kingdom of Portugal, Brazil and the Algarves.

== Border towns ==
- Brazil: Tabatinga, Benjamin Constant, Lauarete, Vila Bittencourt, Ipiranga, Cucui.
- Colombia: Leticia, Tarapacá, La Pedrera, Mitú, Taraira, Yavaraté, La Guadalupe.

== See also ==
- Brazil–Colombia relations
