= Vásquez Cobo–Martins treaty =

1907 treaty between Colombia and Brazil

Vásquez Cobo-Martins treaty
Treaty Between Brazil and Colombia
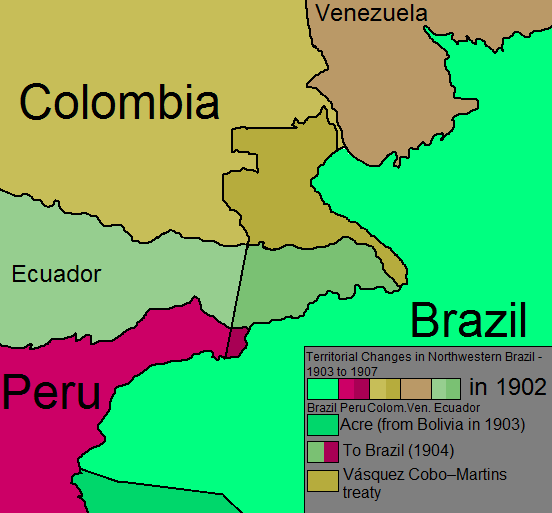
- The territorial changes in northwest Brazil from 1903 to 1907 (including the treaty)
- Signed: 24 April 1907
- Location: Bogotá, Colombia
- Effective: 20 April 1908
- Signatories: Colombia Brazil
- Languages: Portuguese and Spanish

The Vásquez Cobo–Martins treaty, also known as Treaty of Bogotá, was a treaty between Brazil and Colombia denoting the Brazil–Colombia border; It was signed in Bogotá by their respective representatives, the Minister of Foreign Affairs of Colombia, Alfredo Vásquez Cobo, and the Resident Minister on Special Mission to Colombia, Enéas Martins. It was ratified by Colombia by means of Law 97 of 1907 and the Exchange of Ratifications took place on 20 April 1908 in Rio de Janeiro. The treaty established the border from the Rio Negro northwestward along the Amazon River-Orinoco watershed divide, "then generally southward along various river courses and straight-line segments to the mouth of the Apaporis River"

== See also ==
- García Ortiz-Mangabeira treaty
