= 1986 Colombian parliamentary election =

Parliamentary elections were held in Colombia on 9 March 1986 to elect the Senate and Chamber of Representatives. The Liberal Party remained the largest party, but lost its majority in the Chamber.

== Campaign ==
The Patriotic Union made alliances with several of the small parties at the regional and constituency level for the elections, including the Communist Party, some Liberal Party and New Liberalism members, and the National Popular Alliance.

== Results ==
=== Senate ===
Party	Votes	%	Seats	+/–
Colombian Liberal Party	3,382,406	49.32	58	+3
Colombian Conservative Party	2,541,094	37.05	43	–6
New Liberalism	453,550	6.61	6	–2
Patriotic Union	103,001	1.50	2	New
Others	362,783	5.29	5	–
Blank votes	14,801	0.22	–	–
Total	6,857,635	100.00	114	0
Valid votes	6,857,635	99.83		
Invalid votes	11,790	0.17		
Total votes	6,869,425	100.00		
Registered voters/turnout	15,839,754	43.37		
Source: Nohlen

=== Chamber of Representatives ===
Party	Votes	%	Seats	+/–
Colombian Liberal Party	3,290,980	47.71	98	–6
Colombian Conservative Party	2,558,050	37.08	80	–2
New Liberalism	455,554	6.60	7	–4
Patriotic Union	137,134	1.99	3	New
Others	443,210	6.43	11	–
Blank votes	13,189	0.19	–	–
Total	6,898,117	100.00	199	0
Valid votes	6,898,117	99.83		
Invalid votes	11,657	0.17		
Total votes	6,909,774	100.00		
Registered voters/turnout	15,839,754	43.62		
Source: Nohlen
