= Vila Bittencourt =

Coordinates: 1.396172°S 69.426579°W

Vila Bittencourt is a populated place in Amazonas, Brazil on the eastern bank of the Japurá River (or Caquetá River) which forms the Brazil–Colombia border at this point. There is a Brazilian Armed Forces base there.
