= Lawrence Khong =

Megachurch pastor in Singapore

- Born: July 17, 1952 (age 74); Colony of Singapore
- Spouse: Rev (Dr) Nina Khong
- Children: Priscilla Khong (daughter); Michelle Khong (daughter); Anthony Khong (son); Daniel Khong (son)

Ecclesiastical career
- Church: Faith Community Baptist Church (FCBC)
- Offices held: Apostolic Overseer
- Title: Apostle Lawrence Khong

Lawrence Khong
- Simplified Chinese: 邝健雄
Transcriptions

Lawrence Khong Kin Hoong (born 17 July 1952) is a Singaporean Christian religious leader and a magician.

Khong is the founder and overseer of Faith Community Baptist Church in Singapore and the former chairman of LoveSingapore, a network of about 100 socially conservative Singaporean churches. Khong is also the founder and chairman of TOUCH Community Services, a non-profit, non-religious welfare organization.

== Early life and education ==
Khong is the son of a businessman and a housewife. His father was a general commodities wholesaler who came from Guangdong province in China. Khong was a child of his father's second marriage, which began before World War II after his father relocated to Singapore.

Khong attended St Joseph's Institution and National Junior College, where he met his future wife, Nina.

Despite becoming a Christian at the age of 13, he said he "backslid" during his army days. During that time he attended a church camp at Port Dickson and later said that a drowning incident at the church camp made him reflect deeply on life and on himself. He returned to church and joined the Varsity Christian Fellowship. Khong began preaching from the pulpit while he was at university.

As an undergraduate, Khong also started performing publicly as a magician. He became a member of the Singapore Charter of the Society of American Magicians.

After graduating with a B.A. in Business Administration from the National University of Singapore, he worked as an intern pastor. A year and a half later, he married his fiancé Nina, who had completed her medical studies and gained her (MBBS) from the National University of Singapore. The two set off for Dallas so that Khong could attend the Dallas Theological Seminary. While studying at the seminary, Khong was asked to pastor a Dallas church with a Chinese congregation because he could speak some Chinese.

Khong returned to Singapore and joined Grace Baptist Church in 1981.

== Career ==
=== Faith Community Baptist Church ===
Faith Community Baptist Church (FCBC), was founded by Khong as a cell church in 1986. Khong delivered his first message to the new congregation on August 17, 1986.

As of 2014, the church was reported to have a congregation of around 10,000 members.

Besides serving as the pastor of the megachurch, Khong also stages entertainment shows that combine magic, music, drama and dance to engage his congregation.

Khong is one of the International Twelve of Cesar Castellanos.

Khong began assuming the title of "apostle" after a church service in 2000 in which he was given the title by theologian C. Peter Wagner. Wagner was a key leader of the Church Growth Movement and the controversial New Apostolic Reformation, a movement of Pentecostal and charismatic churches advocating for the "lost offices" of church governance, namely the offices of prophet and apostle. Khong's use of the title is not recognised by churches in mainline Christian denominations.

In 2016, Khong delivered a series of sermons at Faith Community Baptist Church in which he called Charles Darwin's Theory of Evolution "a real deception from the Devil". The church's support for creationism in its pulpit and on social media prompted a discussion on the spread of the idea by certain groups of Christian evangelicals in secular Singapore. The Ministry of Education has since clarified that creationism is not taught in local schools.

=== TOUCH Community Services ===
Khong is the founder and chairman of TOUCH Community Services (TCS), a non-profit, non-religious welfare organisation that has 18 services, 19 centres, and 24 youth clubs in Singapore helping the under-privileged. The organisation has served over 100,000 individuals since its establishment.

In 2002, Khong conceptualised Project SMILE or Sharing Magic in Love Everywhere. He was selected as a finalist for the SIP-Schwab Social Entrepreneur of 2007.

In 2007, TCS won the Outstanding Non-profit Organisation Award in the National Volunteerism and Philanthropy Awards, which recognises best practices in the management of volunteers and donors, including fundraising practices, in non-profit organisations.

=== Media and entertainment ===
Khong has been performing magic since his late teens. He started producing movies in 2010 and performing magic shows such as "Magic of Love" and "Magic Box".

Khong shared his experiences of "Magic of Love" in his book Give me the Multitudes! Obeying God's Call into the Media World, TOUCH Ministries International: Singapore but has received some criticism from fellow Christians for his use of magic and involvement in "marketplace ministries."

Following the church's embrace of dominion theology, Khong launched Gateway Entertainment to "reclaim the media industry for Jesus Christ", performing in "totally commercial, non-religious" magic shows and other theatrical productions alongside his daughter Priscilla Khong.

Gateway Entertainment stated that Lawrence Khong was the "first in Asia to receive the Elite Diamond Merlin Award for Magician of the Year" in 2010, an award conferred by the International Magicians Society.

Lawrence Khong has also been vocal against the spreading "anti-Christian and immoral values promoted by the secular world" by entertainers in Singapore, a non-religious state. He has spoken out against a performance by Madonna in the country.

== Recognition ==
In 1998, Khong was conferred the public service medal in recognition of his contributions to the community.

== Controversies ==
=== Views on homosexuality ===
External videos
- Lawrence Khong appearing in a BBC report on the "Wear White" movement, YouTube video

Khong has been criticized for his stance against equal rights for homosexuals in Singapore. In January 2013, Khong issued a statement to emeritus Senior Minister Goh Chok Tong against repealing Singapore's laws that criminalise sex between men. He called the repeal of Section 377A of the Penal Code "a looming threat to this basic (nation) building block by homosexual activists". He has referred to the "homosexual act" as "the greatest blasphemy against the name of God". He has stated he believes in conversion therapy and has called the LGBT community "some of the most intolerant people that I have ever met".

In 2014, LoveSingapore, a network of 100 local churches that Khong chairs, created a guide to supporting Section 377A of the Penal Code. Khong also criticized the Health Promotion Board in an open letter, saying their webpage on sexual health "condones same-sex relationships and promotes homosexual practice as something normal". He has also actively protested against the annual Singapore gay pride event Pink Dot SG, and has supported the counter-campaign and encouraged his followers to speak out against the normalisation of homosexual relationships in Singapore.

== Personal life ==
Khong and his wife, Nina Khong, have four children - Priscilla (a magician alongside him), Michelle, Anthony and Daniel Khong Bao Liang (Senior Pastor of FCBC) - a grandson, Isaac, and a granddaughter, Hannah. Nina Khong has given up her medical practice to serve full time in FCBC and is now CEO of Gateway Entertainment. In 2003, Khong publicly disclosed that Priscilla had had a child out of wedlock. The family has since reconciled with the church and stands strong on their belief of 'sex after marriage'.

=== Singapore Polo Club ===
Khong is a national polo player who won a silver medal with the Singapore team at the 2007 Southeast Asia Games.

In August 2013, Khong filed a suit against the Singapore Polo Club when the club suspended his rights and privileges for two months for allegedly misusing the club's e-mail system and his position as honorary secretary. Khong had sent a mass email to the club members and Registrar of Societies questioning the conduct of the club committee when it amended results of a vote of no confidence against the previous committee.

According to a suspension notice filed in his affidavit, Khong was allowed to keep his horses stabled at the club, but would not have the right of access to the club nor the right to the services of a personal professional polo player. At the time of the suspension, Khong was the honorary secretary of the club. As of 2023, he is the president of the club.

The High Court ruled in Khong's favor and set aside his suspension from the club.
