= Coalition (Colombia) =

Political party in Colombia

Coalición Colombia is a conservative political party in Colombia. In the 2002 legislative elections, the party won, as one of the many small parties, parliamentary representation.
