= Unionist Movement (Colombia) =

Colombian political party

The Unionist Movement (Spanish: Movimiento Unionista) was a center-left political party in Colombia. In the 2002 Colombian parliamentary election, the party won a single seat as one of the many small parties.
