= Emma Claudia Castellanos =

Colombian evangelical pastor and politician (born 1960)

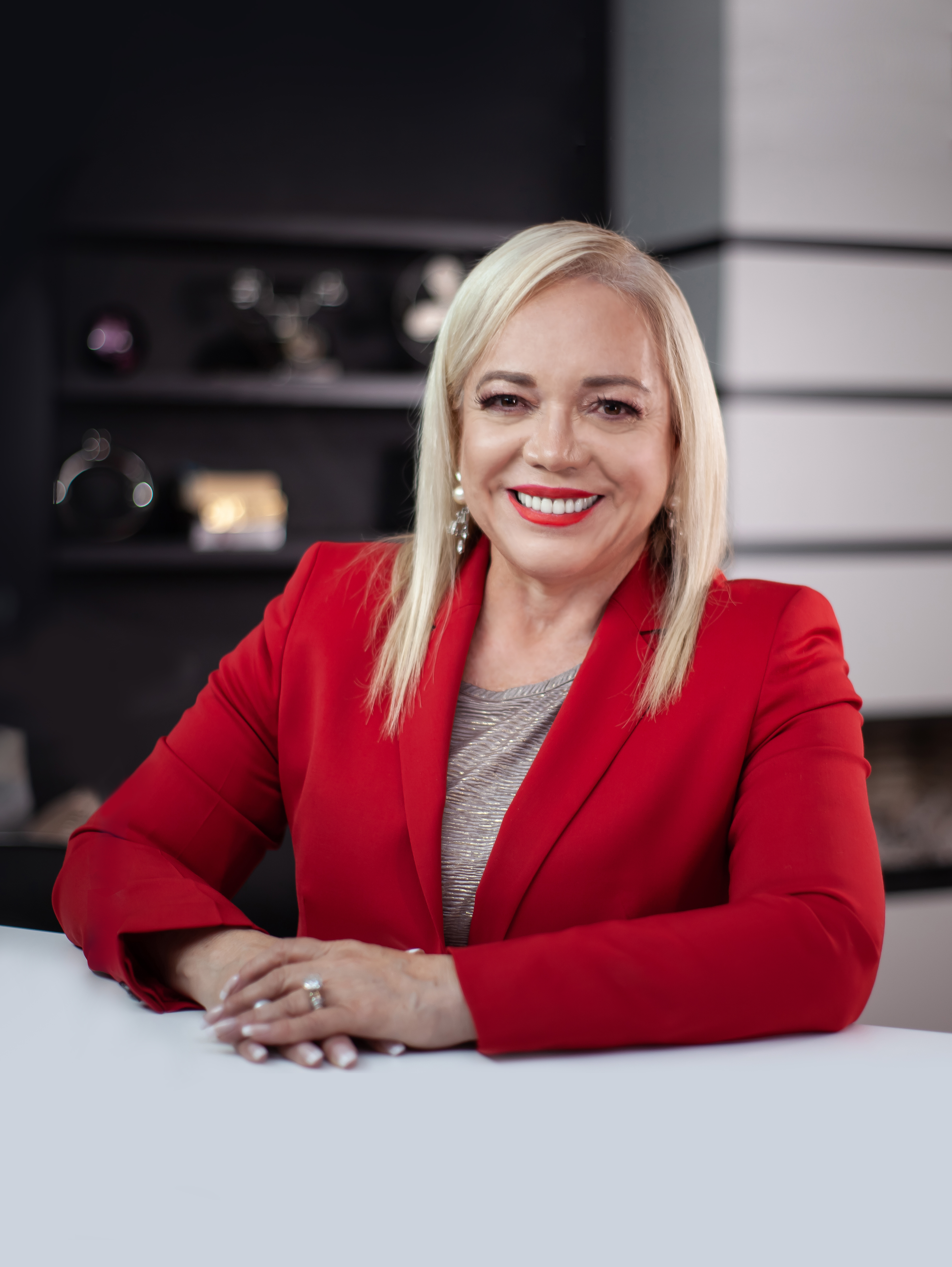
- Official portrait, 2018

Senator of Colombia
- In office July 20, 2018 – July 20, 2022
- In office July 20, 2006 – July 20, 2010
- In office December 12, 1991 – July 20, 1994

Ambassador of Colombia to Brazil
- In office October 6, 2004 – May 30, 2005
- President: Álvaro Uribe
- Preceded by: Jorge Garavito
- Succeeded by: Mario Galofre Cano

Personal details
- Born: Claudia Yadira Inés Rodríguez Almanza; May 4, 1960 (age 66) Bogotá, D.C., Colombia
- Party: Social Party of National Unity (2010-present)
- Other political affiliations: National Christian Party (1989-2006); Radical Change (2006-2010)
- Spouse: César Castellanos (m. 1985)
- Children: 5
- Education: Sergio Arboleda University
- Alma mater: La Gran Colombia University (BL)
- Profession: Lawyer; pastor; politician

Emma Claudia Castellanos (née Rodríguez Almanza; (Note: Castellanos was named Claudia Yadira Inés Rodríguez Almanza at birth. Later, after her marriage, she adopted her husband's surname under the Spanish naming customs, resulting in Claudia Rodríguez de Castellanos. In 2017, she adopted her husband's surname in its original form, Castellanos.) born May 4, 1960) is a Colombian lawyer, evangelical pastor and politician who served as a Senator of Colombia from 1991 to 1994, from 2006 to 2010 and again from 2018 to 2022 and as Ambassador of Colombia to Brazil from 2004 to 2005 under President Álvaro Uribe.

Castellanos studied law at La Gran Colombia University and later earned a specialization in Constitutional Law from Sergio Arboleda University. She is a co-founder of the International Charismatic Mission Church, of which she is pastor with her husband. Castellanos has been one of the most prominent Christian leaders in Colombian politics, founding the National Christian Party.

== Early life ==
Claudia Yadira Inés Rodríguez Almanza (Note: In this Spanish name, the first or paternal surname is Rodríguez and the second or maternal family name is Almanza.) was born on May 4, 1960, in Bogotá, D.C., to Luis Alfonso Rodríguez and Yolanda Almanza. She met César Castellanos in 1980 during a meeting of Evangelical Churches. She studied law at La Gran Colombia University and later Legislative Technique Studies at the School of Public Administration. In 1983, she obtained a specialization in Constitutional Law from Sergio Arboleda University.

=== Political career ===
Castellanos has been described as one of Colombia's most experienced politicians. Her political career began in 1989 when, together with her husband, she founded the National Christian Party, with which she would later launch her presidential campaign in 1990 and for which she would be elected Senator during the 1991 Constituent Assembly of Colombia under the name of the Christian Union. In 2006, the party was closed down after losing its legal status, preventing her from obtaining its endorsement for her campaign for Mayor of Bogotá. She received endorsement from the Radical Change Party, a party she would remain in until 2010, when she officially joined the Social Party of National Unity, of which she is currently a member.

== Notes ==
Diplomatic posts
Preceded by Jorge Garavito	Ambassador of Colombia to Brazil; 2004–2005	Succeeded by Mario Galofre Cano
