= César Castellanos (pastor) =

Colombian evangelical pastor and politician (born 1953)

Member of the Chamber of Representatives
- In office July 20, 1998 – July 20, 2002
- Constituency: Capital District

Personal details
- Born: César Castellanos Domínguez; November 14, 1957 (age 68) Sutamarchán, Boyacá, Colombia
- Party: Social Party of National Unity (2010-present)
- Other political affiliations: National Christian Party (1989-2006); Radical Change (2006-2010)
- Spouse: Claudia Rodríguez (m. 1985)
- Children: Johanna Castellanos; Lorena Castellanos; Manuela Castellanos; Sara Castellanos; Matías Castellanos
- Profession: Pastor; politician
- Known for: Author of the G12 Vision

César Castellanos (born November 14, 1957) is a Colombian evangelical pastor and politician who served as a Member of the Chamber of Representatives from 1998 to 2002 representing Bogotá.

Co-founder of the International Charismatic Mission Church, where he has served as General Pastor since 1983 with his wife, Emma Claudia. Castellanos has authored numerous evangelical strategies, most notably the G12 Vision movement.

Castellanos was also the co-founder of the National Christian Party, to which he belonged until 2006.

== Early life and vision G12 ==
He was born on November 14, 1957, in Sutamarchán, Boyacá, Colombia. In 1986, he began implementing the G12 Vision strategy, inspired by a Christian Cell strategy implemented by Pastor David Yonggi Cho at the Full Gospel Church in Yoido, Korea. This strategy was later redesigned and adapted by Castellanos, naming it G12 Vision, and was adopted by the national and later international chapters.

=== Political career ===
Castellanos was elected to the Chamber of Representatives in the 1998 Colombian parliamentary election, receiving the support of his own party, the National Christian Party, and serving on the Third Committee of the Chamber of Representatives.
