= Colombian People's Party =

Political party in Colombia

Colombian People's Party Partido Popular Colombiano

The Colombian People's Party (Partido Popular Colombiano) is a political party in Colombia. During the 2002 legislative elections, the party won parliamentary representation.
