= Brazil–Colombia relations =

- Brazil: Colombia

Diplomatic mission
- Embassy of Brazil, Bogotá: Embassy of Colombia, Brasília

Envoy
- Maria Elisa Berenguer: Alejandro Borda

Brazil–Colombia relations are the bilateral relations between the Federative Republic of Brazil and the Republic of Colombia. Brazil has an embassy in Bogotá and Colombia has an embassy in Brasília. The Brazilian ambassador to Colombia is Maria Elisa Berenguer. The Colombian ambassador to Brazil is Alejandro Borda. Brazil and Colombia share a land border. Historically relations between both countries have been marked with tension; however, recently they have been trying to improve them. A motive that is driving the forces between these two countries are that they are neighboring countries that could benefit in all aspects if they improve relations with one another. They have started strengthening relations by signing agreements, laws, and treaties into action since their independence from Spain and Portugal.

== Timeline of agreements and relations ==
Colombia declared its independence from the Spanish Empire on 20 July 1810, making it the first South American country to win independence against Spanish colonialism while Brazil declared its independence from Portugal on 8 September 1822. The relations between these two countries have not always been the best and mainly include Amazon-basis considerations and emphasize efforts to prevent the Andean Pact from becoming an instrument for containment of Brazilian influence. These two countries have not interacted with one another very much over the past. Recently in the last decade they have started collaborate and work together more for the bettering of both countries. The first instance of an agreement signed between them was in 1907, when they signed the Treaty of Boundaries. This was just a treaty defining the boundaries of both countries and where the line between them would end up being. Both governments decided that they would use the Tabatinga–Apapóris line as the actual boundary line between them. However, this would not be the last time the boundary conflict would be visited and debated. In 1925, Brazil, Colombia and Peru would meet again to sign another treaty including boundaries again. This treaty would just assure that the countries would use the Tabatinga–Apapóris line as the boundary line between all three countries. The next relation would be when the President of Brazil, Figueiredo, would visit Colombia in 1981. This was the first visit from a head of state from Brazil. In 1981 also, a Visit from the President of Colombia, Julio Cesar Turbay Ayala, to Brazil happened as well. Another agreement was signed into action on November 7, 1994. It was called the Basic Technical Cooperation Agreement between Brazil and Colombia. This agreement impeded the illegal use of precursors and chemical substances essential to the processing of narcotics and psychotropic substances. Basically, making any narcotic and psychotropic illegal in either country. This was mainly done because the boundary between Brazil and Colombia was being used as a highway for cocaine and more powerful narcotics. The boundary was a major door way for smugglers to use into getting illegal narcotics and psychotropics into the countries.

In 1997, another agreement was signed in Cartagena between the two countries. It was an agreement in judicial cooperation and mutual assistance on penal matters between the Federative Republic of Brazil and the Republic of Colombia. This was signed in hopes of ensuring the help of one another in matters that dealt with issues relating to punishment involving crime or offenses. The next decade was only full of meetings from parliaments and heads of government from Brazil and Colombia. The next agreement came in 2008. It was labeled as the protocol on Economic and Commercial Cooperation between Brazil and Colombia. It was a memorandum of Understanding for cooperation in combating the illicit manufacture of and traffic in firearms, ammunition, accessories, explosives, and other related materials. This agreement outlawed the illegal assembling of any of the fore mentioned product. This also was aimed to help on cooperation in defense matters. This meant that both countries would try to collaborate and work together on matter that required both militaries of the countries. The next two years were entirely visits to one another countries by the heads of governments again to discuss ways to improve relations. In 2011, the president of Colombia opened up the first Colombia-Brazil Investment Forum organized by the Intreamerican Development Bank (IDB) in Bogota, Colombia. This was in hopes to boost trade between the two countries and improve their economies as well. In 2015, Brazil and Colombia signed an agreement with its purpose to increase trade in the automotive sector of both countries. Also by signing this agreement, they hope to increases exports and create more jobs. More recently, both countries have signed two memorandums that hoped to boost bilateral trade even more. These expanded trade between them inside of the automotive sector and outside as well. These memorandums solidify the 2015 automotive agreement.

== Trade and investment between Brazil and Colombia ==
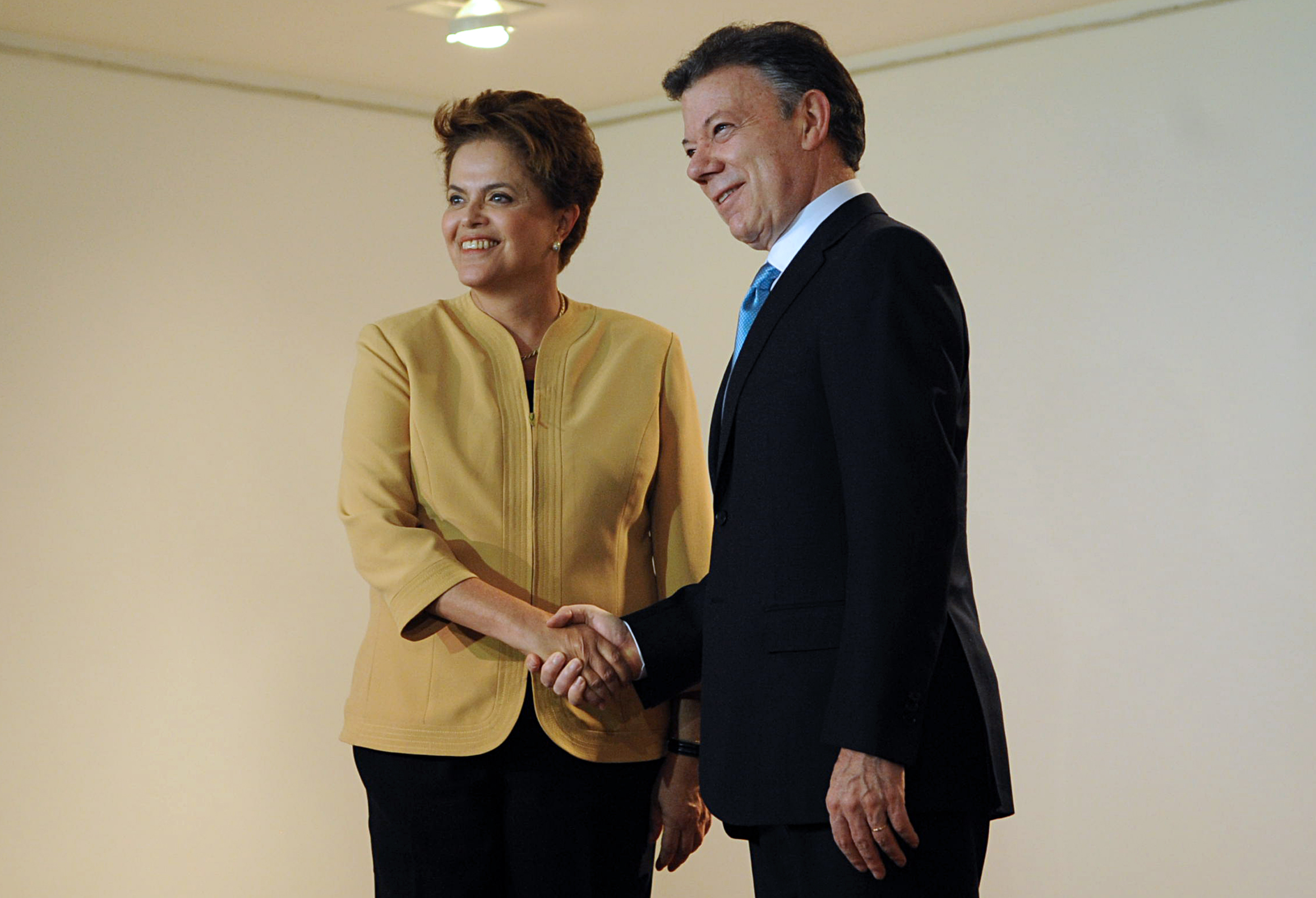
Former Brazilian President Dilma Rousseff and Colombian President Juan Manuel Santos.

Trade between these countries have not been high until about the past decade which has seen a huge spike in it. From 2005 to 2014, trade flows between Brazil and Colombia increased significantly, going from 1.5 billion US dollars to 4.1 billion US dollars. This is a huge increase in trade growth for both countries. The list of exports between both countries are widely varied. The main resources Brazil exported to Colombia were propene, automobiles, tires, AC generators, combustion engines and parts of turbojet engines. These do not include all of Brazil's exports just what they exported to Colombia. Colombia exports to Brazil include: crude petroleum, coal briquettes, coffee, refined petroleum and cut flowers. Colombia exports an estimated value of 2.23 billion US dollars to Brazil. Even with all of this growth happening there is still much more potential between the countries. Brazil and Colombia are wanting to explore to find out the full potential of bilateral trade relations. One bank sees trade almost doubling in the future if the path the countries are on continues.

Another thing that helps bolster trade between Brazil and Colombia are trade agreements. One signed recently helped improve trade even more. It improved trade in the automotive sector and helped assure an earlier agreement from October 2015 that sought to boost bilateral trade in vehicles as well. Another aspect that is helping relations is investment. Colombia having one of the largest economies in South America is a reason why it is such an investment destination for countries including Brazil. Brazilian companies have invested in many sectors including: the iron and steel industry, oil and mining, finance, and even information technology. This list contains only a few sectors that Brazil invests in within Colombia. Brazil actually has an oil company working in Colombia. Braspetro currently operates in ten countries including Colombia. Brazil also created a trading company subsidiary Interbras. This company is expected to do business with multiple countries including Colombia and is expected to make millions of dollars as well.

== See also ==
- Brazil–Colombia border
