= Democratic Unity Party (Colombia) =

Colombian political party

The Democratic Unity Party (Partido Unidad Democrática) was a socialist political party in Colombia. In the 2002 legislative elections, the party won, as one of the many small parties, parliamentary representation.
