= Renovation Movement Labour Action =

Political party in Colombia

The Renovation Movement Labour Action (Movimiento Renovación Acción Laboral) is a political party in Colombia. At the last legislative elections, 10 March 2002, the party won as one of the many small parties parliamentary representation. In the simultaneous legislative elections of 2006, the party won 1 out of 166 Deputies and no senators.
