= La Gran Colombia University =

- Universidad La Gran Colombia
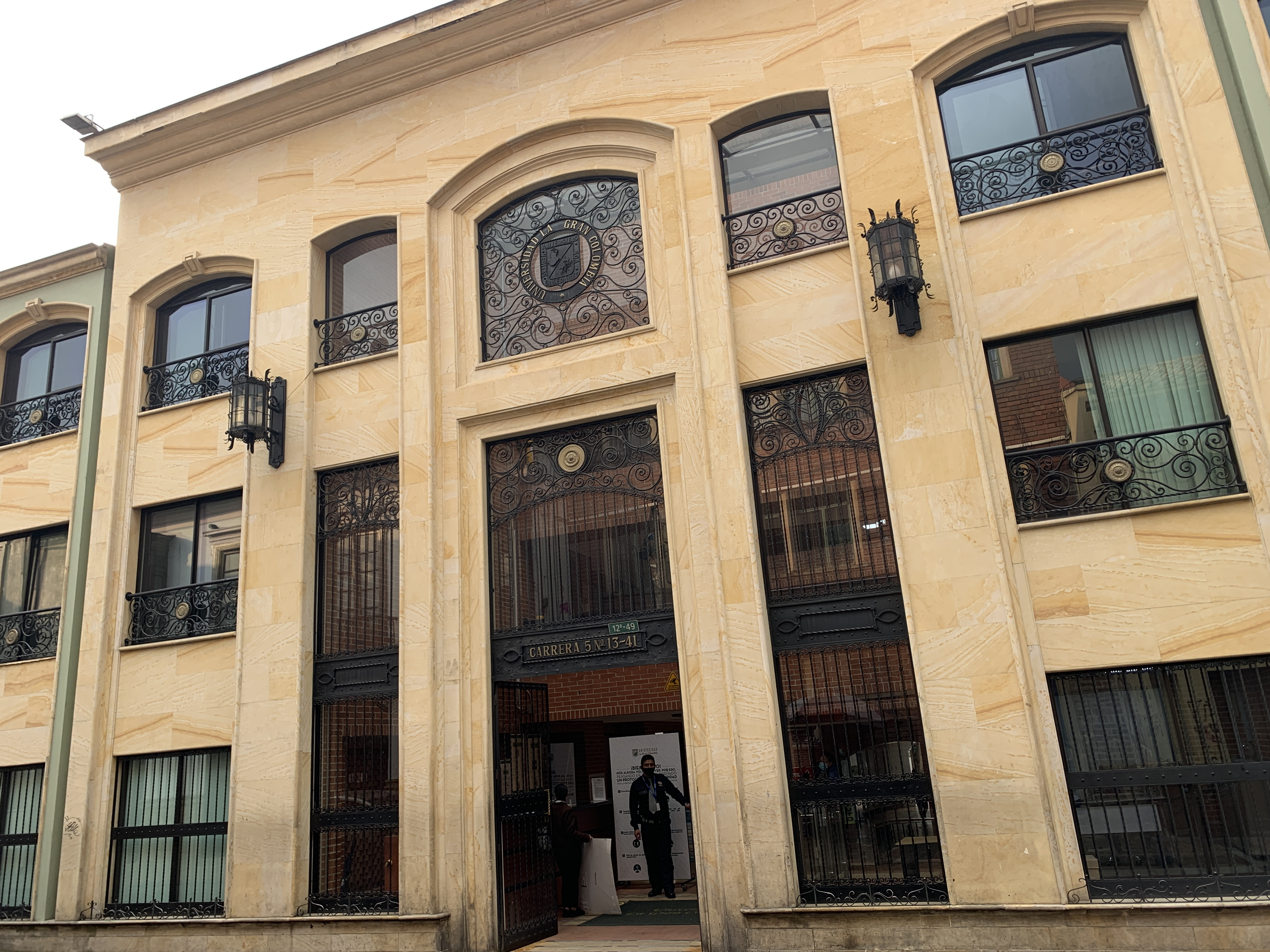
- Motto: LA: Veritas Liberabit Vos; ES: La Verdad Os Hará Libres; EN: Truth Will Make You Free
- Type: Private
- Established: May 24, 1951 by Julio César García Valencia
- Rector: Marco Tulio Calderón
- Location: Cr6 16-40 (main seat) Cll42A 8 - 10 (Engineering seat), Bogotá, D.C. Armenia, Quindío, Cundinamarca, Colombia; 4.5996°N 74.0727°W
- Campus: Urban
- Website: www.ulagrancolombia.edu.co

La Gran Colombia University is a private university located in Bogotá, D.C., Colombia. It was founded on May 24, 1951, by Julio César García Valencia, recognized Colombian historian of the Twentieth century.

== Faculties ==
- Accountancy
- Architecture
- Business administration
- Civil engineering
- Systems engineering
- Agroindustry engineering
- Economics
- Education sciences
- Law

== Institutes ==
- Ethics Center
- Innovation Center
- Julio César García Lyceum
- Languages Center

== See also ==
- Great Colombia
