= Christian Union Movement =

Political party in Colombia

The Christian Union Movement (Spanish: Movimiento Unión Cristiana) was an evangelical Christian democratic political party in Colombia founded in 1990. In the 1990 Constitutional Assembly election, it formed a coalition with Claudia Rodríguez de Castellanos's Christian National Party. It lost its legal status in 2006.
