= Regina 11 =

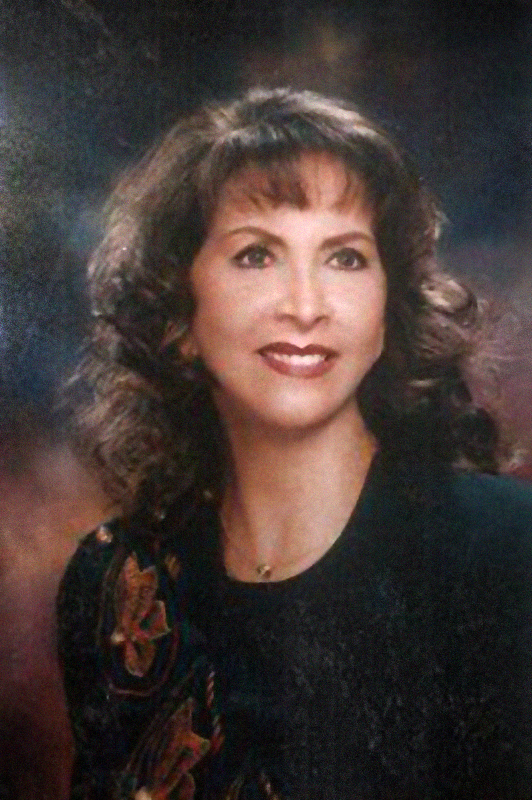
- Undated photo of Regina 11

Senator of Colombia
- In office 1 December 1991 – 20 July 1994

Personal details
- Born: Regina de Jesús Betancourt Ramírez; 16 December 1936 (age 89) Concordia, Antioquia, Colombia
- Party: Metapolitical Unitarian Movement
- Spouse(s): Luis Restrepo (1954–1959; his death); Daniel Jay Liska Tikalsky (1968–1995; his death); William Corraline (2004–2006; divorced)
- Children: 2
- Occupation: Psychic
- Website: www.regina11.com.co

Regina de Jesús Betancourt Ramírez (born 16 December 1936) is a Colombian self-described mentalist, psychic, mystic, and faith healer who is better known to her followers as Regina 11. A now retired politician, she founded and led the Metapolitical Unitary Movement, a political party that carried her to be Councilwoman for the City Councils of Bogotá, Medellín, San Rafael, Une, Vetas, and California, as well as Deputy to the Departamental Assembly of Cundinamarca, and finally Senator of Colombia. In addition, she ran as a candidate for President of Colombia in the Colombian presidential elections of 1986, 1990, and 1994.

== Personal life ==
Regina de Jesús was born on 16 December 1936 in Concordia, Antioquia to Juan de Dios Betancourt and Ermilia Ramírez, the youngest of 18 children. When she was 17 years old she married Luis Restrepo, a merchant from Antioquia with whom she had four daughters, but who died when she was 22. On 29 February 1968 she met Daniel Jay Liska Tikalsky, an American adventurer who had travelled by motorcycle from the Arctic Circle in Alaska down to Tierra del Fuego; they married later that year. With Liska she had one daughter, Johanna. She married a third time, this time on 17 October 2004 in Orlando, Florida to an American man she had met online, William Coraline, but the marriage was short lived; they divorced sixteen months later.

== Career ==
She has published over 20 books on various metaphysical and spiritual subjects, written songs and poetry, and produced videos on her teachings. She has hosted a daily radio talk show, and has worked as a television presenter.

She is the founder of the International Centre of Unity, and founder of the political party "The Metapolitical Unitarian Movement" (Movimiento Unitario Metapolitico).

== Controversy ==
She was kidnapped for five months, and held in the mountains of Colombia. During her kidnapping, she was elected to the city council of Bogotá. When she was released, she was accused of faking the kidnapping. Her husband Danny Liska died shortly after her release. Shortly after that, The Supreme Court of Justice accused her of fraud and sentenced her to home detention. While under house arrest, she wrote Una escoba en el Monte, (A Broom In the Mount), where she related her experiences as a kidnap victim. She was given conditional freedom, but before she could publish her book, she was sentenced to jail once again.

After she was released from house arrest, the Supreme Court of justice found she was innocent, and all charges were lifted. She then moved to live in the United States, and has she travelled to Europe and Central America. She is currently back in Colombia, hosting her radio show.

== See also ==
- List of kidnappings
- List of solved missing person cases (2000s)
