= International Charismatic Mission Church =

Misión Carismática Internacional
- Misión Carismática Internacional
- Location: Bogotá
- Country: Colombia
- Denomination: Evangelicalism, Neo-charismatic movement
- Website: mci12.com

History
- Founded: 1983
- Founder(s): César and Emma Claudia Castellanos

Misión Carismática Internacional (also called International Charismatic Mission Church in English) is an evangelical megachurch, in Bogotá, Colombia, its part of the neo-charismatic movement. It operates under a pyramidal and cellular model.

The senior pastor and head of this organization is César Castellanos and his wife, Emma Claudia Castellanos since its founding in 1983; their four daughters are also pastors at the organization.

In 2016, the attendance is estimated in 25,000 people.

== History ==
The church was founded in 1983 by César and Emma Claudia Castellanos as a cell group with 12 people. This same year, they visited Yoido Full Gospel Church in Seoul to learn about how to develop the church As of 2008, the church had more than 250,000 members in the World, organized into a structure of small cell groups. The church's teaching are titled the G12 Vision, which is based upon the mentoring of 12 disciples similar in method to Jesus. Castellanos stated that he was inspired to create the discipleship program after receiving a vision from God in 1983. In 2016, Misión Carismática Internacional has 25,000 people.

== Statistics ==
According to a census of the Mission in 2022, it would have 142 churches.

== Beliefs and values ==
Its theology is based on the word of faith or prosperity gospel, and focuses on personal holiness and moral upstanding in order to be able to be "used by God". Every member is encouraged to become a cell group leader and have 12 disciples just as Jesus did.

== See also ==
- List of the largest evangelical churches
- List of the largest evangelical church auditoriums
