= Civic and Christian Commitment for the Community =

Civic and Christian Commitment for the Community (Spanish: Compromiso Cívico y Cristiano con la Comunidad, abbreviated C4) was a political party in Colombia. It was the political wing of the church Cruzada Estudiantil y Profesional de Colombia. The party was founded in 1992 by the Chamorro family. The main leader of the party was Jimmy Chamorro Cruz.

The party got 52,748 votes in the 1994 Senate election, and Jimmy Chamorro Cruz was elected senator. Chamorro Cruz continued representing C4 in the Senate until 2006.
