= Metapolitical Unitary Movement =

Political party in Colombia

The Metapolitical Unitary Movement (Spanish: Movimiento Unitario Metapolítico) is a political party in Colombia. It is led by Regina Betancourt de Liska.

== History ==
The party was founded in 1977. In 1991 and 1994, Regina 11 was elected as the party's only legislator.

The party contested the 2022 Colombian parliamentary election but failed to win any seats.

== See also ==
- List of political parties in Colombia
