= G12 Vision =

Christian evangelism strategy

The G12 Vision is a Christian evangelism and discipleship strategy established by César Castellanos, the founder of International Charismatic Mission Church. G12 has been adopted worldwide by different churches.

== History ==
The G12 Vision was formulated in 1991 by César Castellanos, after attending the Yoido Full Gospel Church in 1983. Seeing that their cell group model fosters church growth, he revamped David Yonggi Cho's South Korean church growth strategy. It grew into another church growth enterprise that churches around the world came to study in their own attempts to foster growth, including mainline Pentecostal denominations like the Church of God (Cleveland).

The G12 model has been prominently adopted by churches in many countries including Canada, Hong Kong, the Philippines, Singapore, South Korea, the United Kingdom,((South Africa)) and the United States.

== G12 International Conference ==
An annual G12 International Conference is held in Bogotá, Colombia in January and is hosted by Misión Carismática Internacional church. The President of Colombia has frequently attended these events. Former President of Colombia (2002–2010) Álvaro Uribe attended in 2004, 2008, and 2009. In 2006, Senator Germán Vargas Lleras attended and in 2010, former Minister of Defence and future President Juan Manuel Santos spoke at the conference.
