= Colombian Liberal Party =

Centre to center-left political party in Colombia

Colombian Liberal Party Partido Liberal Colombiano
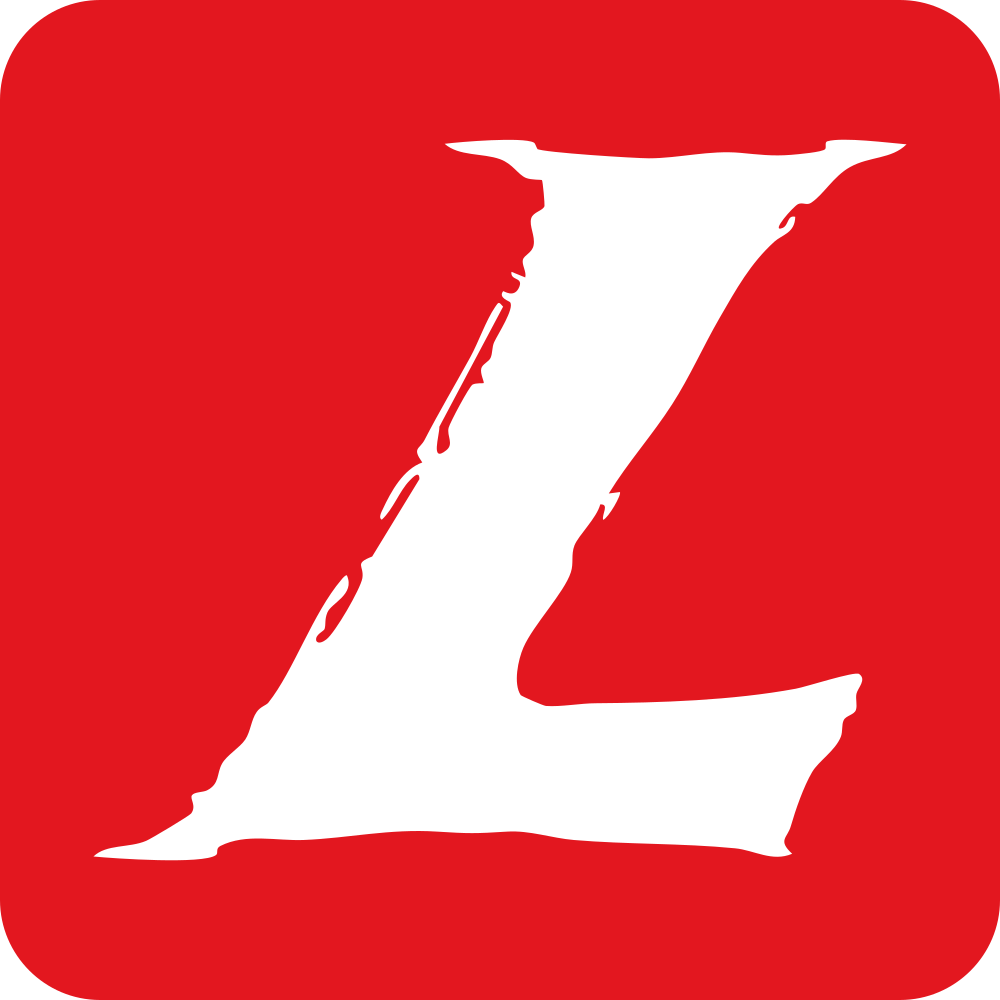
- President: César Gaviria
- Founded: 16 July 1848; 178 years ago
- Headquarters: Av. Caracas, Teusaquillo, calle 36, Bogotá, Colombia
- Think tank: Liberal Thinking Institute
- Youth wing: ONJL
- Women's wing: National Organization of Liberals' Women
- Ideology: Liberalism (Colombian); Social liberalism; Social democracy; Historically: Classical liberalism
- Political position: Centre to centre-left
- International affiliation: Socialist International; Liberal International
- Regional affiliation: COPPPAL
- Colors: Red
- Slogan: Para que vivas mejor
- Anthem: "Himno del Partido Liberal Colombiano" "Hymn of Colombian Liberal Party"
- Seats in the Chamber of Representatives: 32 / 188
- Seats in the Senate: 14 / 108
- Governors: 6 / 32
- Mayors: 181 / 1,102

Party flag

Website
- www.partidoliberal.org.co

The Colombian Liberal Party (Spanish: Partido Liberal Colombiano; PLC), also referred to as the Liberal Party (Spanish: Partido Liberal; PL), is a centrist to centre-left political party in Colombia. It was founded as a classical liberal party but later developed a more social-democratic tradition, joining the Socialist International in 1999.

The Liberal Party along with the Colombian Conservative Party dominated the Colombian political scene from the end of the 19th century until 2002, in bipartisan political hegemony. The two parties were in direct military conflict between 1948 and 1958, during the civil war period known as La Violencia, after which they established the "National Front", agreeing to rotate power, intercalating for a period of four presidential terms. The election victory of independent candidate Álvaro Uribe in 2002 put an end to dominance of two party politics in Colombia.

The Liberal Party supported the left-wing presidency of Gustavo Petro until leaving Petro's coalition on 28 November 2023.

== History ==
The party was founded in 1848 and, in opposition to the Colombian Conservative Party, became one of the two main political forces in the country for over a century. The two parties frequently engaged in armed conflict with one another, precipitating several civil wars.

Under the influence of leading liberal Rafael Uribe Uribe, an advocate of labor rights and what has been described as "a modernized version of liberalism, favorable to state intervention," the Liberal Party moved towards a progressive ideological direction. As noted by one study, "Uribe Uribe's ideas gradually gained followers among the members of his liberal party, especially among its youth, until they crystallized into the political program of 1912." This progressive program, known as the "March Plan," called for (as noted in its text) "Adaptation to the peculiar conditions of Colombia of the principles of labor legislation in force in other countries, such as work accidents, housing for workers, savings funds and protection for the helpless elderly."

In the 1940s, the liberal party turned towards socialism under the influence of the charismatic lawyer Jorge Eliécer Gaitán, despite the antipathy it provoked among party members and liberal leaders. In the rural area, Gaitanism faced a bloody repression to which its scrupulous respect for legality did not prepare it: 15,000 militants were murdered between 1945 and 1948 by death squads supposedly close to the conservatives. Gaitán himself, who was a likely winner of the next presidential election, was assassinated in 1948.

After the period known as La Violencia the Liberals and the Conservative Party reached an agreement to share power from 1958 to 1974 in the so-called National Front agreement that followed the fall of General Gustavo Rojas Pinilla. Nowadays there are many critics of the 16-year agreement but it greatly reduced the intensity of the violent political warfare that preceded it.

Following the end of the National Front agreement in 1974, the Liberal Party dominated Colombian politics until 2002; Liberal candidates won five of the seven Presidential elections and the party was the largest in both the Chamber of Representatives and Senate throughout the entire period.

In the 1994 election the Liberal Party's Ernesto Samper was narrowly elected president. Immediately afterwards he was accused of accepting millions from the Cali Cartel to fund his campaign. While Samper had immunity to prosecution as president, a number of his close associates were convicted of involvement in the so-called Proceso 8000 scandal, including Defence Minister Fernando Botero Zea. Partly due to the scandal the Liberal Party lost seats in the 1998 parliamentary election, although it remained easily the largest party. More seriously, the Liberals were defeated in the presidential election held the same year.

The Liberal Party suffered a major split in the lead-up to the 2002 elections. Horacio Serpa Uribe, the party's unsuccessful 1998 presidential candidate was nominated to run again. However Álvaro Uribe, a former senator and governor from the party launched an independent presidential campaign, backed by the Conservatives and dissident Liberals. Whereas Serpa supported the ongoing idea of negotiations with FARC, Uribe advocated confronting the guerrillas. Uribe was victorious in the elections, securing a majority in the first round. In the aftermath, the "Government endorsed" leadership of the party continued to oppose Uribe's administration, but many senators and representatives supported the government, becoming known as the "Uribist" faction. As a compromise, former president César Gaviria Trujillo was elected party leader in 2005.

At the 2006 legislative election, the Liberals lost around half their seats. While they remained the largest party in the Chamber of Representatives, they finished third in the Senate. Horacio Serpa was again nominated as the Liberal candidate for the subsequent presidential elections of 28 May 2006 and won 11.84% of the popular vote, placing him third, the worst ever result for a Liberal candidate.

During the parliamentary elections of 14 March 2010, the Liberal Party obtained 17 senators and 37 representatives, placing third in both the Chamber of Representatives and Senate. At the 2010 presidential election Liberal candidate Rafael Pardo finished sixth with 4.38% of the vote, worse than Horacio Serpa's 2006 vote. The Liberal Party went on to join the governing coalition of President Juan Manuel Santos, and supported his bid for reelection in the 2014 Colombian presidential election.

For the 2018 Colombian presidential election, the party nominated former Vice President from 1994-1996 Humberto De la Calle. De La Calle was eliminated in the first round, and for the second round declined to endorse either of the candidates, announcing he would cast a blank vote instead.

The party did not run a presidential candidate for the 2022 Colombian presidential election, and instead endorsed the candidacy of Federico Gutiérrez. For the second round, the party endorsed Rodolfo Hernández Suárez.

The party supported Paloma Valencia in the first round of the 2026 presidential election and Abelardo de la Espriella in the second round.

== Ideology and position ==
The PLC has been described as liberal, social liberal, social democratic, socialist, progressive, and big tent with positions on the political scale ranging from being in the centre, centre-left, being on the left, centre-right, and right-wing. The Liberal Party supports a progressive and mixed economy, but the party has also been described as neoliberal.

Historically, it has been classically liberal. Helen Delpar said that there were two factions in the PLC, the radical faction supporting federalism, anti-clericalism, and laissez-faire with the goal of turning the country into some form of utopia quickly, and the moderate Independents, who opposed the radicals' program by citing that it didn't fit Colombia's case and will thwart economic and political advancement. Anders Rudqvist on the otherhand claims that all of the PLC was secularist and federalist.

== Electoral history ==
=== Presidential elections ===
Election Year	Candidate	First Round		Second Round		Result
Election Year	Candidate	Votes	Percentage	Votes	Percentage	Result
1974	Alfonso López Michelsen	2,929,719	56.35 (#1)			Won
1978	Julio César Turbay Ayala	2,503,681	49.50 (#1)			Won
1982	Alfonso López Michelsen	2,797,627	41.01 (#2)			Lost
1986	Virgilio Barco Vargas	4,214,510	58.36 (#1)			Won
1990	César Gaviria	2,891,808	48.18 (#1)			Won
1994	Ernesto Samper	2,623,210	45.30 (#1)	3,733,336	50.57 (#1)	Won
1998	Horacio Serpa	3,696,334	34.78 (#1)	5,658,518	46.58 (#2)	Lost
2002	Horacio Serpa	3,514,779	31.80 (#2)			Lost
2006	Horacio Serpa	1,404,235	11.84 (#3)			Lost
2010	Rafael Pardo	638,302	4.38 (#6)			Lost
2014	Did not run					—
2018	Humberto de la Calle	396,151	2.05 (#5)			Lost
2022	Supported Federico Gutiérrez	5,069,526	23.94 (#3)			Lost
2026	Did not run					—

== See also ==
- Liberalism in Colombia
- Union Party for the People
