= Christian National Party (Colombia) =

Political party in Colombia

The Christian National Party (Spanish: Partido Nacional Cristiano) was a Christian democratic political party in Colombia. In the 2002 parliamentary election, the party won one seat of parliamentary representation. It dissolved in 2005.
