= Communism in Colombia =

The history of communism in Colombia dates back to the start of the 1920s and has its roots in the ideas of the Russian October Revolution. Several self-proclaimed communist guerrilla groups, including the Revolutionary Armed Forces of Colombia (Fuerzas Armadas Revolucionarias de Colombia, FARC) and the National Liberation Army (ELN), state that they seek to seize state power in Colombia through violent means. Organizations such as the ELN have continued their decades-long conflict with the United States-backed Colombian government.

Many historians and social scientists, including Charles Bergquist and David Bushnell, who have studied Colombia's modern history, have noted the influence and intervention of both the United States and the Soviet Union in efforts to hinder or promote the spread of communism in the country.

Some important figures in the history of communism in Colombia include Jorge Eliécer Gaitán, Jaime Pardo Leal, Carlos Pizarro Leongómez, Bernardo Jaramillo Ossa, and Jaime Bateman Cayón. Many of these figures were later assassinated due to their revolutionary views. According to critics, there is evidence that the Colombian Army and the Central Intelligence Agency were complicit in some of these assassinations.

== History ==
In the early 20th century, Colombia was linked to the international economy through its exportation of coffee, minerals, fruits, and oil. These exports, paired with the importation of European goods, international loans, and the presence of international companies such as the United Fruit Company and Tropical Oil Company, created a booming Colombian economy, often at the expense of the workers.

However, Colombian society still consisted mainly of poor laborers living in rural, undeveloped land. Further burdening the booming nation was a history of civil wars and political corruption, which pitted the liberal and conservative factions of Colombian governance against one another. This set the stage for a workers' uprising, inspired by the ideas of the Russian October Revolution.

=== Origins of Socialist Ideology ===
The labour movement in Colombia differed from other movements in Latin American countries. While socialist ideology in countries like Argentina and Brazil was influenced by European immigration, Colombia had little connection to left-wing European ideologies. Rather, the labour movements in Colombia were inspired by the disconnect laborers felt with the major political parties.

The perceived lack of representation led to the creation of the Socialist Party in 1919. The creation of the party, inspired by Bolshevism and the end of World War I, was led by Colombian intellectuals and left-wing media. Among these figures was Luis Tejada, a co-editor of left-wing newspaper 'El Sol', who published multiple articles praising the importance of Lenin to their cause. Tejada, alongside Russian immigrant Silvestre Savitski, further supported the study of Marxism among the liberal youth.

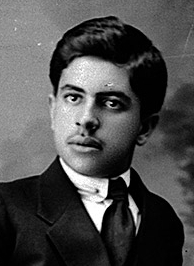
Colombian Socialist writer Luis Tejada.

In the early years of the party, no major steps were taken to establish a connection with the international community of Communist parties, despite the importance of international affairs being discussed and analyzed in the Third Socialist Conference of 1921. The proposal to seek membership in the Communist International (Comintern) was rejected. However, it became apparent that Bolshevism was growing in popularity among Colombian Socialist intellectuals. After failure in the 1922 elections, backing moderate Socialist candidate Benjamin Herrera, this iteration of the party began to split apart due to a lack of interest in joining international efforts to pursue communist thought. However, the party ideology was revived by young Colombian Bolsheviks who took over the Socialist Congress in 1924.

Pro-communist ideology among intellectuals was fully displayed in 1924 at the Socialist Congress held in the Colombian capital, Bogotá. The leaders of this congress broke ties with the previous three socialist conferences and immediately pursued international involvement. This conference became the first attempt for Colombian socialists to establish communications and a partnership with the Moscow Third International. The conference attendees declared their affiliation with the Comintern and approved the 21 Conditions of Leninism. However, with no true party capable of executing such policies and establishing a political presence in Colombia, the Latin American sector of the Comintern resisted approving the affiliation. Following the conference, Socialist leader Luis Tejada died, and Silvestre Savitski was expelled from the country by the Colombian government a year later for his efforts in spreading communist doctrine.

=== The Comintern and Colombian Communism ===
By the mid-1920s, at the Second Workers' Congress in Bogotá, socialist ideology continued expanding and was no longer moderate. The year before the congress, a large strike led by Labor Union leader Raul Maheca was organized against the Tropical Oil Company in Barrancabermeja, resulting in the firing of 1,200 laborers and the arrest of strike leaders.

The congress proceeded to establish a National Workers Confederation (CON) to manage and coordinate future labor movements. Despite serving as a radical trade union, the leaders of CON believed that the organization would better serve its purpose under the guidance of a new revolutionary party. In 1926, as part of the Third Workers Congress, the Partido Socialista Revolucionario (PSR) was established to seek affiliation with the Comintern. This goal would be achieved when the PSR was officially recognized and approved for affiliation with the Comintern during the Sixth World Congress in 1928.

Their affiliation would expedite the spread of socialism and strengthen the current labor movements in Colombia. Within a year, the Comintern and PSR leaders would be involved in one of the biggest and deadliest strikes in Colombian history, the Banana Massacre in Santa Marta.

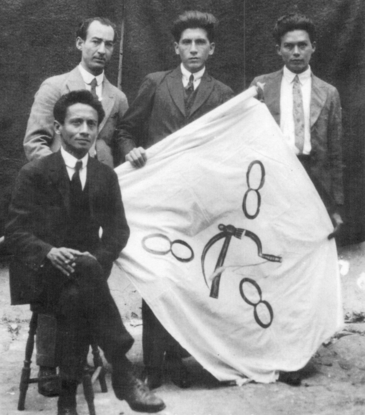
Raul Maheca and three PSR leaders posing with a flag displaying the three 8's symbol. The flag symbolizes the idea of 8 hours of work, 8 hours of study, and 8 hours of rest.

=== The Banana Massacre (1928-29) ===
- Also known as the Santa Marta Massacre.

The United Fruit Company (UFCO) was a multinational corporation that exported fruit, such as bananas and pineapples, mainly from Latin American banana-growing countries to the United States and Europe. UFCO workers on banana plantations in Colombia organized a labor strike in December 1928. The national labor union leaders Raúl Eduardo Mahecha and Maria Cano traveled to the plantations to organize the strikes, and demanded that the workers be given written work contracts, that they be obligated to work no more than eight hours per day and six days per week, and that the company stop the use of "food coupons", or scrip.

The union leaders protested at the banana zone of Santa Marta, the capital of the Magdalena department in the north of the country.

After U.S. officials in Colombia, along with United Fruit representatives, portrayed the workers' strike as "communist" with "subversive tendency", in telegrams to the U.S. Secretary of State, the government of the United States of America threatened to invade with the U.S. Marine Corps if the Colombian government did not act to protect United Fruit's interests.

The ruling Conservative government's President Miguel Abadia Mendez sent troops led by General Carlos Cortés Vargas to capture the strike leaders, send them to prison at Cartagena, and send additional troops to protect the economic interests of the United Fruit Company. U.S. warships carrying troops were on the way to Colombia to protect U.S. citizens working for the United Fruit Company in Santa Marta and their property. The Colombian army also opened fire on people who gathered at the main plaza of the city of Ciénaga to support the strikers. The popular Liberal Party leader Jorge Eliécer Gaitán used the term "La Masacre de las Bananeras" to raise opposition among Colombian society against the massacre. The Liberal Party press criticized the Colombian government's brutality in breaking the strike.

The Comintern was indirectly involved in the planning and execution of the strike in Santa Marta, and its failure was openly discussed at the First Conference of Latin American Communist Parties that took place in Buenos Aires the following year. The conference sought to uncover the reasoning behind the failure of the labor uprising and determine who was to blame for it. Maheca, along with other leaders of the Partido Socialista Revolucionario, submitted a report detailing the key reasons for the failure and other facts about the strike. Maheca reported that over 32,000 workers were armed and prepared to strike against UFCO, yet he blamed the indecision of their liberal allies in Bogota for the uprising's overall failure. The Liberal party, with whom they sought a united front, did not provide solidarity with the strike or with the attempt for revolution, directly weakening the cause of the PSR. The Comintern also provided its own report outlining its interpretation of the failure in Santa Marta. The letter from the Comintern made clear the belief that the uprising would have been successful and revolutionary had it been led by a true communist party.

=== The Liberal Revolution (1930-45) ===
Liberals came into power in 1930 under the leadership of Enrique Olaya Herrera and the presidency of Alfonso López Pumarejo (1934–38). An uprising began after the UFCO banana workers' massacre and eventually brought the Liberals into power. The Colombian Communists also supported the Liberals and the social and economic issues brought up by their government.

The Liberals implemented a series of reforms during their 15 years in power, collectively known as the "Revolution on the March." The 1936 constitutional amendments gave the government the power to influence the privately owned economic interests. The rights of the laborers were established, including an 8-hour workday, a 6-day workweek, and the right to a pre-informed strike at work. Influenced by the Communists, the Liberal government reformed Colombia's education system by putting it in the hands of the government, rather than the Catholic Church.

The social revolution of the Liberals in Colombia lasted only about 15 years. President Alfonso López Pumarejo (1942–46) did not complete his second term due to political pressure against him which forced him to resign. In 1946, the Conservatives came to power when Jorge Eliécer Gaitán failed in his bid to become the Liberal Party candidate, and ran instead as an independent, thereby splitting the Liberal vote and giving the victory to Conservative candidate Mariano Ospina Pérez.

=== El Bogotazo (1948) ===
After taking state power from the Liberals in 1946, the Conservatives began to overturn Liberal reforms. The popular Colombian Liberal Party leader Jorge Eliécer Gaitán led the National National Leftist Revolutionary Union or UNIR (Unión de Izquierdista Revolucionaria). They organized protest movements against the Conservative policies.

Gaitán was shot and killed about 1:15 p.m. on April 9, 1948, near the corner of Carrera Séptima and Jiménez de Quesada in Central Bogotá during the 9th Pan-American Conference.

After the death of Gaitán, riots erupted in Bogotá. The enraged mob killed his assassin Juan Roa Sierra and dragged his body in the streets to the front of the presidential palace, where it was hanged. The rioters took control of all national radio stations in the city of Bogotá; announcements were delivered against the Conservative government of Mariano Ospina Pérez. Bridges were blown up, and this caused a lack of food in the city. The airfields at Honda, Cartago, Barrancabermeja and Turbo were also taken. The rioters' slogan was Yankee imperialism wants to convert us into military and economic colonies, and we must fight in defense of Colombian society.

== La Violencia ==
Following the events of "El Bogotazo", a decade-long civil war broke out between the Conservative and Liberal factions of Colombian politics. The conflict, known as "La Violencia", would claim the lives of over 200,000 people. While directly resulting from the assassination of liberal politician Jorge Eliécer Gaitán, the rising tensions that resulted in "El Bogotazo" and "La Violencia" can be attributed to the return to power of the Conservative party in 1946 and its encouragement of seizing back territories held by liberal officials and supporters. As a result, conflict broke out among the politically polarized lower classes in the countryside of Colombia, leading to a Liberal-Conservative Civil War. By the end of the conflict, the majority of the casualties would be peasants and laborers.

The conflict ended in 1958 with the formation of a unified political party from Colombia's Liberal and Conservative factions. The new bipartisan system became known as La Frente Nacional (National Front) and involved alternating political power between the Liberal and Conservative branches of the new party. This movement also resulted in the establishment of a political superpower that would effectively prevent the involvement of other political groups, such as the Colombian Communist Party (PCC) in government. The National Front system lasted until 1990. In that time, the new party system led to the consolidation of socio-economic, military, religious, and political power. With the support of the military, the church, and corporations, the National Front effectively surpassed opposition political movements and any political or social reforms.

=== Republic of Sumapaz ===
A squatters' colony of approximately 6,000 landless people emerged in parts of the Cundinamarca, Tolima, Huila, Caquetá, and Meta departments, areas of rural conflict. In the late 1940s, the Republic of Sumapaz was created by Communists and was the target of military campaigns between 1948 and 1965. The Sumapaz Republic dissolved in 1958.

== Notable Colombian communists ==
- Manuel Marulanda
- Jacobo Arenas
- Raúl Reyes
- Alfonso Cano
- Camilo Torres

== Communist organizations of Colombia ==
- Colombian Communist Party (1930–present)
- FARC (1964–2017)
- National Liberation Army (Colombia) (1964–present)
- Communist Party of Colombia (Marxist–Leninist) (1965–present)
  - Popular Liberation Army (1967–present)
- Movimiento Obrero Independiente y Revolucionario (1970–present)
- Marxist–Leninist League of Colombia (1971–1982)
- Marxist–Leninist–Maoist Tendency (1974–1982)
- Proletarian Line (1976–1982)
- Revolutionary Communist Group of Colombia (1982–present)
- Workers Revolutionary Party of Colombia (1982–1991)
- Simón Bolívar Guerrilla Coordinating Board (1987–1990s)
- Guevarista Revolutionary Army (1992–2008)
- Clandestine Colombian Communist Party (2000–2017)
- Colombian Communist Party – Maoist (2001–present)
- Revolutionary Independent Labour Movement
- Common Alternative Revolutionary Force (2017–present)

== See also ==
- Anarchism in Colombia
- Liberalism in Colombia
- Conservatism in Colombia
