= Colombian Communist Youth =

Youth wing of the Colombian Communist Party

Colombian Communist Youth Juventud Comunista Colombiana
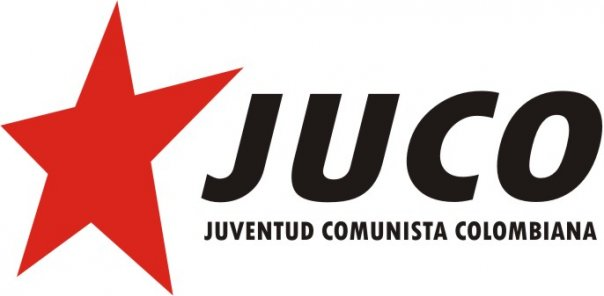
- Abbreviation: JUCO, JuCo
- Secretary-General: Kevin Siza Iglesias
- Founded: July 17, 1932
- Headquarters: Bogotá, Colombia
- Ideology: Communism; Marxism-Leninism; Progressivism; Anticapitalism; Feminism; LGBT movements Scientific socialism Marxist humanism Bolivarianism
- Political position: Left-wing
- International affiliation: World Federation of Democratic Youth (WFDY)

Website
- Bogotá website Facebook; X(Twitter)
- Youth Movement of the Colombian Communist Party

The Colombian Communist Youth (Spanish: Juventud Comunista Colombiana, JUCO) is a Communist, Marxist-Leninist, and Bolivarian Colombian youth organization, connected to the Colombian Communist Party (PCC). It is a member of the World Federation of Democratic Youth (WFDY), of which it is the Coordinator for the Latin America and Caribbean region After its 17th National Congress in March 2023, former student leader of the Colombian Association of University Students (ACEU) and labor lawyer, Kevin Siza Iglesias, was elected as its Secretary General.

== History ==
=== Origins ===
==== Communist Youth League of Colombia ====
The earliest origins of the JUCO lie in the founding of the Communist Youth League of Colombia (LJCC) on the 17th of July 1932, only two years after the founding of the PCC, headed by Jesús Villegas. The LJCC was an organization guided by the ideology of Marxism-Leninism that oriented its actions towards building unions and agrarian leagues with broad youth participation. It held two congresses without much documentation. The persecution of and resulting necessary clandestine nature of communists and communist organizations within Colombia in the following decades led to the complete dissolution of the PCC, which included the LJCC.

==== Formation of current organization ====
The current organization was founded on May 1, 1951, as the Juventud Comunista Colombiana, or JUCO, holding its first conference in secret. During the dictatorship of Gustavo Rojas Pinilla (1953–1957), both the Colombian Communist Party and Colombian Communist Youth, were outlawed. On June 9, 1954, JUCO member Helmo Gómez Lucich, a National University student from Peru, was protesting the murder of fellow student Uriel Gutiérrez when he was shot by the Colombian Battalion. Along with Gómez Lucich, Álvaro Gutiérrez, Rafael Chávez, Hernando Morales, Hernando Ospina, Jorge Chía, Jaime Pacheco, Higo León, and Jaime Moor were also shot. In their memory, the 8th and 9 June are celebrated as the Days of the Fallen Students. On July 8, 1954, communist and liberal students created the Federation of Colombian Students, drawing broad inspiration from the JUCO, which would lead the student resistance against the Rojas Pinilla regime.

Between 1956 and 1959, three National Union of Colombian Students (UNE) congresses were held, originally uniting communists and liberals, but eventually remaining under the leadership of the JUCO. In 1959 the first National Plenary Meeting of JUCO Leaders was held, aimed at the reorganization, constitutional development of the Communist Youth and the expansion of its national influence. This Plenary Session popularized the 'JUCO' abbreviation, as opposed to the former 'JCC', to refer to the organization. In July 1961 the Third National Conference of the Communist Youth of Colombia met clandestinely to discuss and approve the "Line of the Masses".

=== 1960s ===
From November 29 to December 1, 1962, the first Congress of JUCO was held in Bogotá under the slogan, "For the Colombian revolution, let's organize the youth!" (Spanish: Por la revolución colombiana organicemos la juventud), and Manuel Cepeda Vargas being elected General Secretary.

In 1963 the first National University Congress met, which founded the National University Federation (FUN), where JUCO members were widely represented. In 1964 JUCO carried out a national solidarity campaign with the peasants' resistance in Tolima, where a 'kill quota' was put out and JUCO members Habacuc Trujillo and Hernando González Acosta were killed by the military.

On September 22, 1965, Hernando González Acosta was killed in an ambush by the military in Riochiquito, Cauca. González Acosta was a youth activist at the Free University of Colombia and active leading figure in JUCO. In 1964, JUCO's Central Executive Committee highlighted him as the political commissar of the armed movements of Riochiquito, Cauca. Together with Jacobo Arenas, he helped establish FARC in the Marquetalia Republic in Planadas, Tolima. He received a 'nombre de guerra' of "Leovigildo Rodríguez". In his memory, JUCO's Bogotá branch, the 6th Front of the FARC-EP, and a FARC-EP school in the Eastern Bloc are named after him.

In 1965, the Fifth Plenary Meeting of the Central Committee of JUCO expelled what they called "factionalists" from within (Francisco Garnica and Fred Kaim, among others) who defended the Chinese Communist Party and its ideology. The expelled would contribute to the founding of the Communist Party of Colombia (Marxist-Leninist) later in 1965.

On October 11, 1966, the Second JUCO Congress was held, its motto was "Winning and organizing the Colombian youth for the revolutionary struggle" (Spanish: Ganar y organizar la juventud colombiana para las luchas revolucionarias) where they stressed the need to 'proletarianize' the organization's ranks, as a majority of its members were students.

=== Crisis of the 1990s ===
The fall of "real socialism" and PCC crisis strongly affected the JUCO. By 1991, about half of its Central Executive Committee resigned from membership and several regional branches disbanded. An arduous effort of reconstruction began, confirmed by the 8th Congress ('For the right to be Young', September 18–20, 1992) and lasting until the 9th.

The reconstructive and unitary effort allowed the National Assembly of University Students (April 6–10, 1995) to be held at the National University, where around a thousand students from all the country's universities participated. The efforts also converged with the creation of the Colombian Association of University Students (ACEU) at the National Congress of University Students in Cartagena during May 22–28, 1998, a student union organization with a JUCO presence, among other liberal and leftist entities.

In 1999, the 10th Congress declares the organization to have been successfully stabilized.

=== 2000s ===
The 11th Congress, lasting November 8 to 11, presented the "Youth for a New Homeland" Platform (Spanish: Plataforma Juvenil por la Patria Nueva). The platform was oriented towards unity of democratic youth, based on 7 points:

Youth Unity....

1. for democratic change
2. against imperialism and militarism
3. for the right to youth organization and participation
4. for public education and a dignified life for youth
5. for sports and cultural activities
6. for opportunities for rural youth
7. against all types of discrimination

these points guided the participation of the JUCO in the youth spaces of the Social and Political Front, a since dissolved left-wing political coalition in Colombia which included the Colombian Communist Party.

The 12th National Congress, held in December 2005, ("Unity our banner, revolution our struggle") maintained the "Youth for a New Homeland" Platform while linking it to the new unitary perspective of the PCC, united with the Alternative Democratic Pole (PDA) in the Great Democratic Coalition.

Colombian Communist Youth is one of the most important youth political organizations in Colombia, and-at some point-had extensive participation in youth groups. Most of its mass influence is centered on the study body of public universities, high school students, youth groups in urban areas, collectives of young workers, and youth in the agrarian sector within zones of historical PCC influence.

In 2008, its 13th National Congress ("In the struggle for democratic peace, there is the youth of Colombia") was held, its main bets revolved around strengthening the calls for a negotiated exit in the Colombian Conflict.

Currently, the JUCO is governed by the decisions of its 14th National Congress, held in December 2011 in Bogotá. Its synthesis is contained in its slogan: "Unity in the streets: for hope, peace, and socialism."

=== 2010s ===
==== Patriotic March ====
In 2012, they participated in the social and political movement Patriotic March (Spanish: Marcha Patriótica). Being the largest youth organization within the movement, they made up its youth sector alongside the Federation of University Students (FEU) and other youth groups. In 2014, following the 2013 return of the Patriotic Union's legal status and their celebration at its Fifth Congress where they decided to rebuild their similar youth group: Union of Young Patriots (UJP), JUCO held its 15th National Congress.

In August 2018, they celebrated their 16th National Congress in the city of Ibagué, which slogan was "Let's join together for hope, democracy, and peace".

==== Reform ====
Recently, JUCO has been the subject of multiple accusations in cases of gender-based violence involving some of its members and have been publicly working to fix the issue. To this end, the organization has been working on feminist training and strengthening of the political line to facilitate the purging of sexist 'machista' and patriarchal practices in its ranks. This path created to draw attention to and prevent gender-based violence continues to be nurtured within the organization.

In recent years, the JUCO has mobilized to accompany citizens in various exercises of protest in numerous regions following a strong onslaught against social leaders in Colombia and the continued presence of strengthening paramilitaries. They have also participated in different strikes carried out throughout Colombia.

== Notable members ==
Multiple politicians, activists, and guerillas notable in Colombian political history have been members of JUCO, this includes Pastor Alape, José Antequera, Patricia Ariza, Jaime Bateman, Gabriel Becerra, Alfonso Cano, Yira Castro, Jaime Caycedo Turriago, Iván Cepeda, Manuel Cepeda, Pedro Julio Mahecha, Henry Millán, Luis Otero Cifuentes, Jaime Pardo Leal, and León Zuleta.

=== General Secretaries ===
- Jaime Caycedo Turriago (1974–1980).
- Magnolia Agudelo (1992–1996).
- Nixon Padilla (1999–2002).
- Jhonny Alejandro Marín (2018–2023).
- Kevin Siza Iglesias (2023–present).

== See also ==
- Colombian Communist Party (PCC)
- Communist Party of Colombia (Marxist-Leninist) (PCC-ML)
- World Federation of Democratic Youth (WFDY)
- Colombian Conflict (1964–present)
- Revolutionary Armed Forces of Colombia (FARC)
- National Liberation Army (ELN)
- 19th of April Movement (M-19)
- La Violencia (1948–1958)
