= Carlos Antonio Lozada =

Julián Gallo Cubillos
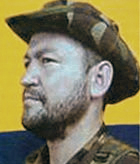

Senator of Colombia
- Incumbent
- Assumed office 20 July 2018

Personal details
- Born: 24 March 1961 (age 65) Bogotá, Colombia
- Party: FARC
- Profession: Politician

Julián Gallo Cubillos, aka Carlos Antonio Lozada (born 24 March 1961 in Bogotá, Colombia) is a Colombian former guerrilla member of the Revolutionary Armed Forces of Colombia (FARC) and politician.

During his early years, Lozada allegedly became a member of the Colombian Communist Youth (JUCO), later joined the Colombian Communist Party, and subsequently went into clandestineness as a member of the FARC guerrillas.

== Biography ==
His parents lived as farmers in an area of central Colombia. During the civil war: “The state expropriated farms, cattle, pigs, and chickens from us, as they did with thousands of other compatriots”. In Bogotá, he joined the Communist Youth when he was fifteen. Soon afterward, he attended an anti-government demonstration and was beaten by the police and jailed for a month. His parents warned him against joining the FARC: his mother objected on religious grounds, and his father told him that a city boy wasn’t suited to guerrilla life. Against their wishes, Lozada headed for the countryside to join the guerrillas in 1978.

== FARC negotiator ==
Lozada was first identified as a member of the FARC during the failed 1999-2002 FARC-Government peace process in San Vicente del Caguán. According to the military, Lozada reorganized the FARC structure in 2003 and promoted the Clandestine Colombian Communist Party, the clandestine political arm of the FARC in urban areas designed to infiltrate and recruit ideologues for the FARC.

== Wanted by the United States ==
According to the United States Department of State, Lozada is a member of the Higher Command of the FARC and participated in setting and implementing FARC's cocaine policies, including directing and controlling the production, manufacture, and distribution of hundreds of tons of cocaine to the United States and internationally; the "taxation" of the illegal drug trade in Colombia to raise funds for the FARC; and the murder of hundreds of people who violated or interfered with the FARC’s cocaine policies. The United States government is offering a reward of up to US$2.5 million for information leading to the arrest and/or conviction of Lozada.
