= Iván Cepeda =

Colombian politician (born 1962)

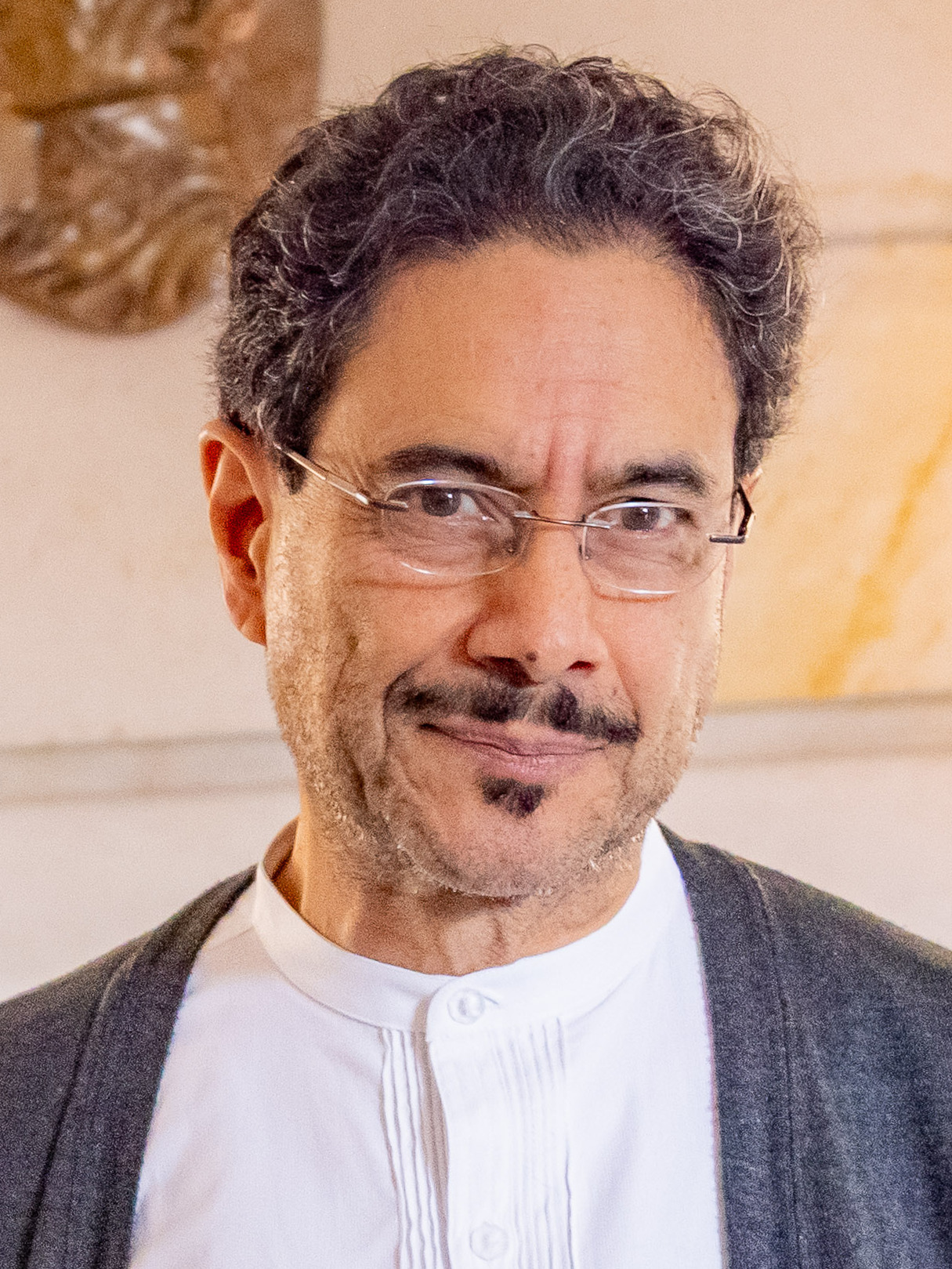
- Cepeda in 2026

Senator of Colombia
- Incumbent
- Assumed office 20 July 2014

Member of the Chamber of Representatives
- In office 20 July 2010 – 20 July 2014
- Constituency: Capital District

Personal details
- Born: Iván Cepeda Castro; 24 October 1962 (age 63) Bogotá, D.C., Colombia
- Party: Historic Pact (2025–present)
- Other political affiliations: PCC (1975–1987); JUCO (1975–1987); M-19 (1990–2003); FSP (1999–2003); PDA (2009–2025); PHxC (2021–2025)
- Spouse: Pilar Rueda (m. 2014)
- Parents: Manuel Cepeda; Yira Castro
- Education: Sofia University (BPhil); University of Lyon (MPhil)
- Occupation: Politician; philosopher; human rights activist

Iván Cepeda Castro (born 24 October 1962) is a Colombian politician, human rights activist, and philosopher serving in the Senate of Colombia since 2014. He is a member of the Historic Pact political party and is a political leader on the Colombian left. He served in the Chamber of Representatives from 2010 to 2014. He is the founder of the Manuel Cepeda Foundation, named after his father, who was assassinated in 1994. He was the Historic Pact candidate in the 2026 presidential election, losing to Abelardo de la Espriella by less than 1% of the vote.

Cepeda was first elected to Congress as a member of the Chamber of Representatives in 2009. He was elected to the Senate in 2014, and was re-elected in 2018 and 2022.

In 2026, Cepeda ran for President of Colombia, receiving 40.90% of the vote and placing second in the first round round of voting to far-right candidate Abelardo de la Espriella. He lost in the second round to Espriella, receiving 48.70% of the vote, while Espriella receiving 49.66% of the vote.

== Early life and education ==
Born in 1962 in Bogotá into a political family, Cepeda is the eldest son of Manuel Cepeda Vargas, leader of the Colombian Communist Party, and Yira Castro. In 1965 at the age of 3, Cepeda and his family were forced into exile, and during his early years lived in Prague.

Following the Warsaw Pact invasion of Czechoslovakia, his family sought refuge in Havana, Cuba. They returned to Colombia in 1970 but remained a target of political violence. At the age of 13, Cepeda joined the Communist Youth. At age 19, he moved to Bulgaria to study at Sofia University, where he earned a bachelor's degree in philosophy.

== Early career ==
Cepeda's time in the Eastern Bloc was a period of ideological transition; Cepeda returned to Colombia in 1987 as a critic of the Soviet model, which he considered authoritarian, advocating instead for a democratic and pluralistic left-wing approach.

In Colombia, Cepeda became involved in the presidential campaign of Bernardo Jaramillo Ossa. Jaramillo Ossa was assassinated in 1990. The same year, Cepeda joined the M-19 Democratic Alliance party, after the former urban guerilla group signed a peace treaty and disarmed. On August 9, 1994, his father, then a Senator, was assassinated in Bogotá by a joint operation between state agents and paramilitary groups.

== Human rights activism ==
Following his father's assassination, Cepeda created the Manuel Cepeda Foundation with his then-wife, Claudia Girón, to identify the perpetrator. In 2003 Cepeda and others founded the National Movement for Victims of State Crimes, made up of 17 organizations that sought justice for crimes that occurred during the armed conflict in the 1980s and 1990s. This led to increased violent threats against Cepeda, leading him to go into exile in France in 2000. He would later return to Colombia in 2003 to resume his work advocating for victims of state and paramilitary violence in Colombia.

Cepeda has worked to promote the memory of Patriotic Union members killed by the Colombian state since 1984, regarded by institutions such as the National Center for Historical Memory as victims of a political genocide. He bases his stance on the defense of human rights and peace processes. He has lived in exile on several occasions.

During the start of Gustavo Petro's presidency, he served as a peace talk facilitator with far-left Marxist–Leninist guerrilla groups such as FARC and ELN.

== Political career ==
=== Chamber of Representatives (2010–2014) ===
Cepeda entered electoral politics in 2009, winning a seat in the Chamber of Representatives for Bogotá in 2010. As a member of the Alternative Democratic Pole, he focused in investigating paramilitary influence in politics.

=== Senate (2014–present) ===
Elected to the Senate in 2014 and re-elected in 2018 and 2022, Cepeda served as a peace talk facilitator, first with the far-left Marxist–Leninist guerrilla group FARC and then with the far-left guerrilla organization ELN.

Between 2023 and 2025, Cepeda ranked as the second senator with the most absences from plenary sessions of the Congress, surpassed only by Lidio García of the Liberal Party. He said that most of his absences were due to his participation in meetings of the Dialogue Table with the ELN and in meetings related to the peace process.

=== 2026 presidential campaign ===
Following the legal and political shifts of 2025, Cepeda emerged as the principal successor to President Gustavo Petro within the left-wing Historic Pact coalition. In October 2025, he won the party's internal primary with 65% of the vote, defeating former health minister Carolina Corcho.

Colombia's National Electoral Council (CNE) has launched a preliminary investigation into Iván Cepeda's campaign for the 2025 inter-party primary, prompted by a request from Senator Jota Pe Hernández and former Cali city councilman Juan Martín Bravo. The allegations concern donations that may have significantly exceeded legal limits. However, the process remains in the preliminary verification phase, as the CNE is still collecting evidence from Cepeda regarding his primary campaign's finances.

In March 2026, Cepeda officially registered his candidacy for the May 31 general election, selecting Indigenous leader and fellow Senator Aida Quilcué as his vice-presidential running mate.

His campaign focused on the continuation of the Total Peace policy, agrarian reform, and the protection of judicial independence. Cepeda followed a line of continuity in terms of human rights and the fight against climate change. He supported reducing Colombia’s dependence on fossil fuels, while also expressing support for continuing the outgoing president’s policy of steering the country toward renewable energy and away from any new oil and gas development. He also opposed "the establishment of new foreign military bases [in Latin America]," while supporting “multilateralism" and "non-membership in military alliances such as NATO."

On economic issues, he aimed for better wealth redistribution in order to reduce the country’s socio-economic disparities. This would have involved greater tax progressivity, higher taxes on large fortunes, and especially on the profits of major corporations. The revenue generated would have been used to fund social programs and help improve infrastructure and public services. Cepeda proposed the creation of a "People’s Bank", to which the most vulnerable households could turn to apply for microloans enabling them to develop their economic activities. He supported the reforms carried out by Gustavo Petro, such as the substantial increase in the minimum wage, pension reform, and the expansion of agrarian reform by returning one million hectares of land to victims of the armed conflict.

== Legal battle with Álvaro Uribe ==
Cepeda is the primary civil party in a high-profile legal dispute with former President Álvaro Uribe. The case began in 2012 when Cepeda presented testimonies to Congress alleging Uribe's involvement in the creation of paramilitary groups. Uribe initially sued Cepeda for defamation. The Supreme Court of Colombia dismissed the charges in 2018 and instead opened an investigation into Uribe for witness tampering and bribery. This led to Uribe’s 2020 house arrest and his resignation from the Senate, a move that shifted the jurisdiction of the case to the ordinary justice system. In July 2025, a criminal court convicted Uribe of bribery and procedural fraud, sentencing him to 12 years of house arrest.

However, the conviction was overturned in October 2025 by the Superior Tribunal of Bogotá, which cited procedural flaws in wiretap evidence and acquitted the former president. Subsequently, Cepeda’s legal team announced the filing of an extraordinary appeal (casación) before the Supreme Court.

== Personal life ==
Cepeda was previously married to Claudia Girón. He is currently married to attorney Pilar Rueda.

== Bibliography ==
- Víctor Carranza, alias El patrón [Víctor Carranza, alias "The Boss"]. 2012. Cowritten with Javier Giraldo.
