= José Antequera =

Colombian activist and politician (1956–989)

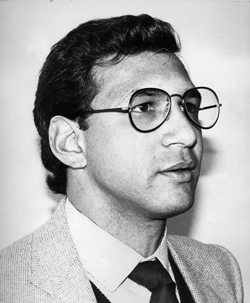
- Born: September 7, 1956; Barranquilla, Colombia
- Died: March 3, 1989 (aged 32); Bogotá, Colombia
- Education: University of Atlántico
- Occupations: Activist, Politician
- Political party: Patriotic Union
- Spouse: María Eugenia de Antequera
- Children: José Darío Antequera Guzmán; Érika Antequera Guzmán
- Parent(s): Eva Antequera; Augusto Antequera

José de Jesús Antequera Antequera (Barranquilla, September 7, 1956 – Bogotá, March 3, 1989) was a left-wing Colombian activist and politician. He was a member of the Patriotic Union (UP). He was killed by paramilitary groups.

== Life ==
The son of Eva Antequera and criminal lawyer Augusto Antequera, José Antequera studied at the Universidad del Atlántico in Barranquilla, where he developed political activities as the general secretary of the Colombian Communist Youth and the president of the National Union of University Students.

He married María Eugenia de Antequera in 1977.

He denounced links between paramilitaries, members of the National Army of Colombia, and politicians.

He then moved to Bogotá, where he was the national leader of the Patriotic Union and national secretary of organization of the Colombian Communist Party after the death of Teófilo Forero. He was close to Bernardo Jaramillo Ossa, UP presidential candidate, who was later assassinated in 1990.

"Because now and always, our flag is and will be of peace."

— José Antequera

== Murder ==
On March 3, 1989, only 4 days after the death of Teófilo Forero, Antequera was murdered in the El Dorado International Airport in Bogotá, while he was heading to Barranquilla, an attack in which the then-presidential pre-candidate of the Liberal Party, Ernesto Samper, was wounded with 11 bullets from an Ingram 9 mm submachine gun, Antequera was shot 28 times by a hitman identified as Luis Fernando Mona Hincapié, a 20-year old from Medellín, who was later killed by Administrative Department of Security (DAS) bodyguards.

His assassination was followed by protests and riots, in rejection of the refusal of the then mayor of Bogotá, Andrés Pastrana, to allow a collective farewell ceremony for the slain political leader.

=== Investigations ===
Some investigations carried out by the Analysis and Context Unit of the Office of the Attorney General of Colombia pointed to an alliance between paramilitary groups, state security agencies and drug traffickers as responsible for the murder. His crime, like that of the other members of the PU, was declared a crime against humanity in 2014. Particularly, the links of Antequera's crime with the murders of Bernardo Jaramillo Ossa, and Carlos Pizarro have been investigated due to the coincidences with both, and it is even linked to the crime of Luis Carlos Galán that occurred five months later, based on the declarations Jhon Jairo Velásquez Vásquez, alias Popeye, a hitman for the Medillín Cartel. Pablo Escobar Gaviria, affirmed that the type and model of weapon used in Galán's crime were the same used in the crimes of Antequera, Jaramillo, and Pizarro, which belonged to a batch of weapons smuggled from Israel by Gonzalo Rodríguez Gacha, as well as the participation of the latter's gang of hitmen in the first three assassinations. Likewise, investigations carried out by the prosecutor's office since 1992 established that Luis Fernando Mona Hincapié had been a co-worker of cousins Andrés Arturo and Gerardo Gutiérrez, known to be the hitmen who shot Jaramillo and Pizarro respectively, who worked alongside Mona Hincapié in a billiard cue factory in Medellín were allegedly recruited to commit the assassinations by a man identified as Héctor de Jesús Echeverría Acevedo, a possible hitman boss of a criminal group identified as La Oficina. Echeverría was found dead on the night of April 12, 1990.

In 2014, his case, like others of the genocide against the Patriotic Union was declared a crime against humanity. In 2015, 3 members of his bodyguard staff were called for investigation. In 2015, the case was reopened.

Currently, a process is underway in the Inter-American Court of Human Rights within the framework of the genocide against the Patriotic Union, which on January 30, 2023, declared the Colombian State guilty of being the main promotor of political extermination against the Patriotic Union, and therefore, guilty of collaborating with paramilitary organizations that murdered Antequera.

== Descendants ==
Antequera was the father of José Darío Antequera Guzmán, the director of Center of Memory, Peace, and Reconciliation of Bogotá, and Erika Antequera Guzmán, a journalist.

== Documentaries ==
- By Erika Antequera Guzmán, The Story They Didn't Tell: José Antequera (winner of Honorable Mention at the Bogotá Film Festival in 2010).
- The generation that was stolen from us: José Antequera (documentary broadcast on Canal Capital).
