= Francisco Garnica =

Colombian youth activist (1940-1965)

Francisco Garnica Narváez
- Born: 1940; Palmira, Colombia
- Died: December 15, 1965 (age 24/25); Cali, Colombia
- Cause of death: Assassination
- Known for: Activism, Death
- Political party: Colombian Communist Party Communist Party of Colombia (Marxist–Leninist)
- Movement: Colombian Communist Youth (JUCO)

Francisco Garnica Narváez (Palmira, 1940–Cali, 15 December 1965) was a Colombian political activist and youth leader.

== Life ==
Son of Francisco Garnica and Leonor Narváez, he was an activist leader in left-wing youth movements.

Garnica was a regional Secretary for the Valle del Cauca branch of the Colombian Communist Youth, the youth wing of the Colombian Communist Party, until he resigned in 1965 to join the newly created Communist Party of Colombia: Marxist-Leninist (PCC-ML). He was elected to its first Central Executive Committee.

== Execution ==
On December 14, 1965 in Guacarí, Valle del Cauca, together with Carlos Alberto Morales and Ricardo Torres, he was arrested by the Colombian National Army and taken to the III Brigade in Cali, where they were tortured and executed. The executions took place at midnight on December 15, 1965.

== Tributes ==
In his memory, varies fronts and sects of the Popular Liberation Army (EPL) and dissidents, such as Frente Francisco Garnica, took on his name.
