= Gabriel Becerra =

Colombian politician and lawyer (born 1976)

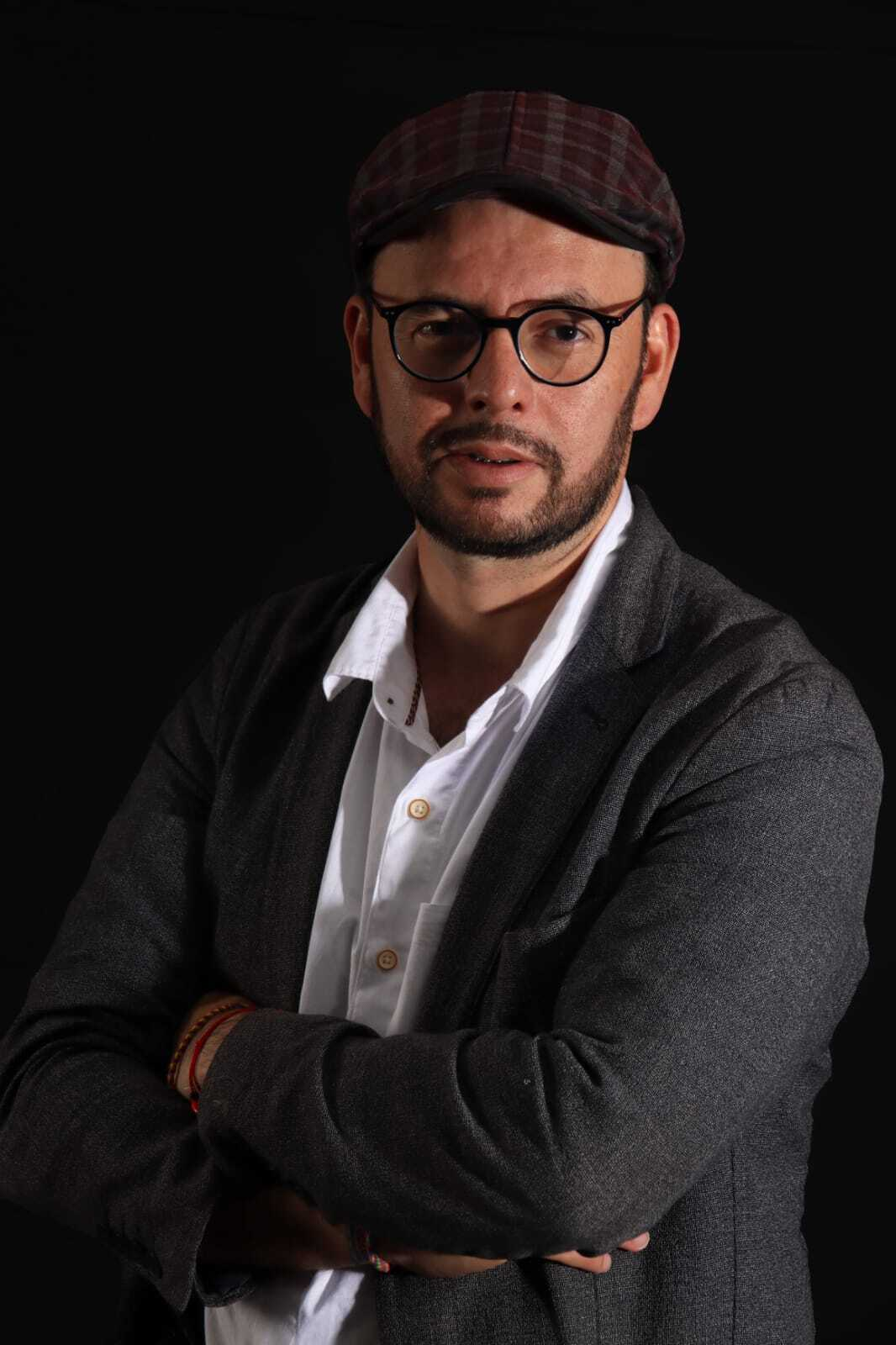
- Becerran in 2022

Member of the Chamber of Representatives
- Incumbent
- Assumed office July 20, 2022
- Constituency: Capital District

Personal details
- Born: Gabriel Becerra Yáñez; February 4, 1976 (age 50) Cúcuta, Norte de Santander, Colombia
- Party: Historic Pact (2025-present)
- Other political affiliations: Colombian Communist Party (2002-2013); Patriotic Union (2013-2025); Historic Pact for Colombia (2021-2025)
- Education: Autonomous University of Colombia
- Occupation: Lawyer; activist; politician
- Website: gabobecerra.com

Gabriel "Gabo" Becerra Yáñez (Note: Latin American Spanish: [ɡaˈβɾjel beˈsera ˈʝaɲes].) (born February 4, 1976) is a Colombian lawyer, activist, and politician who has served as a member of the Chamber of Representatives since 2022. A member of the Historic Pact, Becerra previously served as secretary general of the Patriotic Union and general manager of the Colombian Communist Party.

== Early life, family and education ==
Gabriel Becerra was born on February 4, 1976 in Juan Atalaya in the city of Cúcuta, Norte de Santander. He is the second child of four siblings. He is a graduate of the Juan Atalaya Integrated Departmental School with a bachelor's in Industrial-Metalworking. In the 1990s, he moved to Bogotá, where he currently resides.

Becerra is a lawyer, receiving his law degree in 2009 and completing a major in public law in 2013 at the Autonomous University of Colombia. He holds a Master's degree in political studies and international relations from the Universidad del Rosario. As of 2021, he was a candidate for a Doctorate (PhD.) in Latin American social studies at the National University of Córdoba in Argentina.

As of professional, he has been a legal advisor in the Regulatory Support Unit and Legislative Work Unit of the Bogotá City Council, the Colombian House of Representatives, and the Colombian Senate.

He is a columnist in Semanario Voz, the PCC's newspaper, and a member of the editorial committee of Revista Taller.

== Political career ==
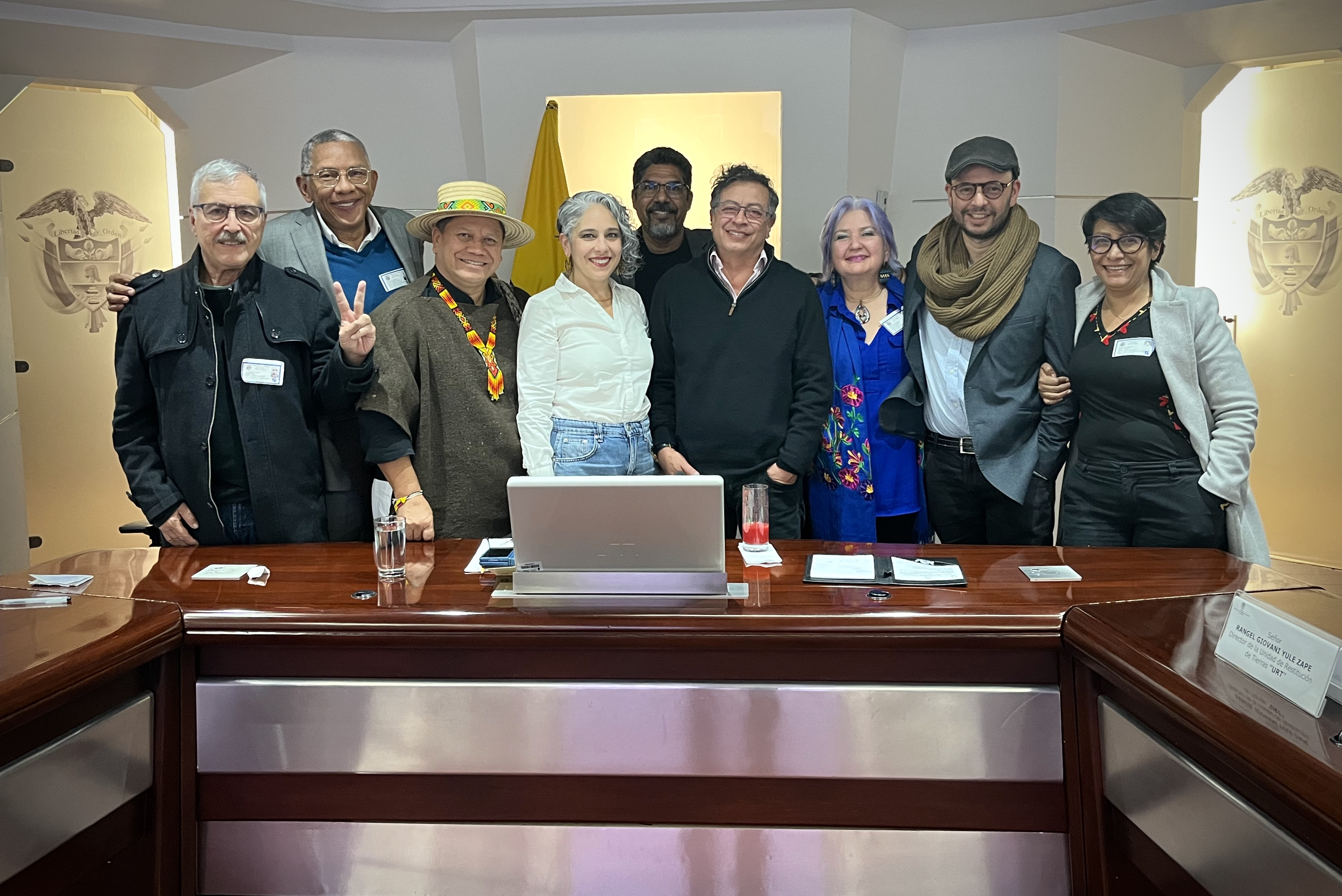
Gabriel Becerra (second to the right) at a meeting of the Political Committee of the Historic Pact for Colombia (24 January 2025)

He began his political activities as a student leader; in 1994, during his schooling, he was one of the founders of the National Association of Secondary Students (ANDES) and later in 1998, at University, he helped found the Colombian Association of University Students (ACEU).

During his time as a student leader, he began his involvement with the Colombian Communist Youth (JUCO), of which he became General Secretary of in 2002. Then, he became Political Secretary of the District Committee of the Colombian Communist Party (PCC).

As the manager of the PCC, he has promoted policies of alliance between the left-wing forces in Colombia, participating in the formation of coalitions like the Social and Political Front in 1999 and the Alternative Democratic Pole in 2005, where he was part of the national leadership team and its coordination of electoral campaigns.

He was a leader during the process of reorganizing the Patriotic Union (UP) after its 5th Congress, held in November 2013, and the return of its legal status as a party. At the 6th UP Congress, held in 2017, he was elected Secretary General.

In 2019, together with Gustavo Petro and Aída Avella, he contributed to the Humane Colombia/Patriotic Union alliance, as an electoral political agreement.

=== Representative in the Chamber ===
In 2020, he was one of the founders and the coordinator of the promotional team which gave rise to the Historic Pact for Colombia, a coalition that brought together left-wing parties and movements in Colombia for the Presidential and Legislative Elections of 2022. This alliance allowed for the victory of Gustavo Petro and Francia Márquez in the Presidential race.

In those elections, he was a candidate for the Chamber of Representatives of Colombia of Bogotá as a Historic Pact candidate, participating with the legal endorsement of the UP and support of the PCC.He was eventually elected and took office on July 20, 2022.

He is part of the First Constitutional Commission, the Special Commission for Surveillance and Monitoring of the Electoral Body, and the Peace Commission. Among other issues, his legislative agenda emphasizes university and educational reform, dignified work and the statute of labor, political reform for democratic transparency, and peace.
