= Manuel Cepeda =

Colombian politician

Manuel Cepeda Vargas
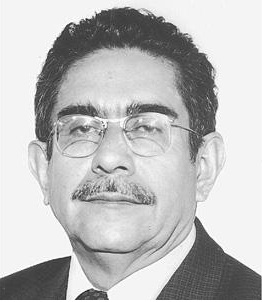
- Manuel Cepeda

Senator of Colombia
- In office 20 July 1994 – 9 August 1994

Member of the Chamber of Representatives of Colombia
- In office 20 July 1992 – 20 July 1994

Personal details
- Born: 13 April 1930 Armenia, Quindío, Colombia
- Died: 9 August 1994 (aged 64) Bogotá, D.C., Colombia
- Cause of death: Assassination by shooting
- Party: Patriotic Union
- Other political affiliations: Communist Party
- Spouse: Yira Castro (m. 1960; died 1981)
- Children: Iván Cepeda; Maruja Cepeda
- Education: University of Cauca
- Profession: Lawyer

Manuel Cepeda Vargas (13 April 1930 — 9 August 1994) was a Colombian lawyer and Senator, gunned down in Bogotá on 9 August 1994 as part of a campaign against the Patriotic Union. A Communist party politician, he had been a Member of the Chamber of Representatives of Colombia from 1992 to 1994. In 2010, the Inter-American Court of Human Rights determined that Colombia violated the Inter-American Convention On Human Rights in the investigation of his death.

== Early life and education ==
Manuel Cepeda Vargas was born on 13 April 1930, in Armenia, department of Quindío. While studying at the Universidad del Cauca, he joined the Colombian Communist Party in 1952.

== Career ==
In 1958, at the VIII Congress of the Colombian Communist Party, he was elected to the party's Central Executive Committee. He was put in charge of rebuilding the Colombian Communist Youth (JUCO) and was made that group's general secretary. In his work with JUCO, he worked with Jaime Bateman Cayón, Hernando González Acosta, Yira Castro (his future wife), Jaime Pardo Leal and Miller Chacón.

Cepeda Vargas was jailed for revolutionary activity in 1964. While imprisoned in La Modelo, he wrote the poetry book Vencerás Marquetalia ("You will overcome Marquetalia"), a tribute to the Marquetalia Republic.

Cepeda Vargas and his family were forced into exile in 1965, moving to Czechoslovakia. After the Prague Spring, they moved again to Cuba. The family returned to Colombia in 1970.

He was a columnist for the weekly Proletarian Voice (later known as the Weekly Voice), which he later directed. The paper continuously denounced the repression of the Colombian Communist Party (PCC), National Union of Opposition (UNO) and the Patriotic Union (UP).

Cepeda Vargas was named Secretary General of the Colombian Communist Party in 1992, succeeding Álvaro Vásquez. He was elected to the senate on the Patriotic Union ticket.

== Personal life ==
Cepeda Vargas married Yira Castro in 1960. The couple had two children, Iván Cepeda Castro and María Cepeda Castro. Yira died on 9 July 1981.

== Death ==
Manuel Cepeda Vargas was shot and killed in the streets of Bogotá on 9 August 1994. He was 64 years old. His killing was attributed to paramilitary groups that received support from individuals affiliated with the Colombian military. Two army officers were found guilty of his murder. A 2010 ruling by the Inter-American Court of Human Rights found the Colombian state had violated the Inter-American Convention On Human Rights in how they handled the investigation of his death.

== Legacy ==
A school in Bogotá and a Western Bloc of the FARC-EP front are named in his honor, although his son, Iván Cepeda Castro, has repudiated the use of his father's name on the part of the FARC and has condemned the actions of that guerrilla organization. Iván stated on a column for El Espectador in 2008 that he "[condemns] the actions carried out by the so-called 'Manuel Cepeda' front, which have cost the lives of civilians in dynamite attacks". In the first round of the 2026 presidential election, Iván Cepeda placed second, advancing to the second round.

== Published works ==
- Vencerás Marquetalia (1964)
- Yira Castro : i bandera es la alegría (1983)
- Balada de los hombrecitos anónimos (Fondo Mixto de Promoción de la Cultura y las Artes del Cauca, c. 1995)
