= Jaime Caycedo =

Colombian politician and anthropologist (born 1944)

Jaime Caycedo Turriago
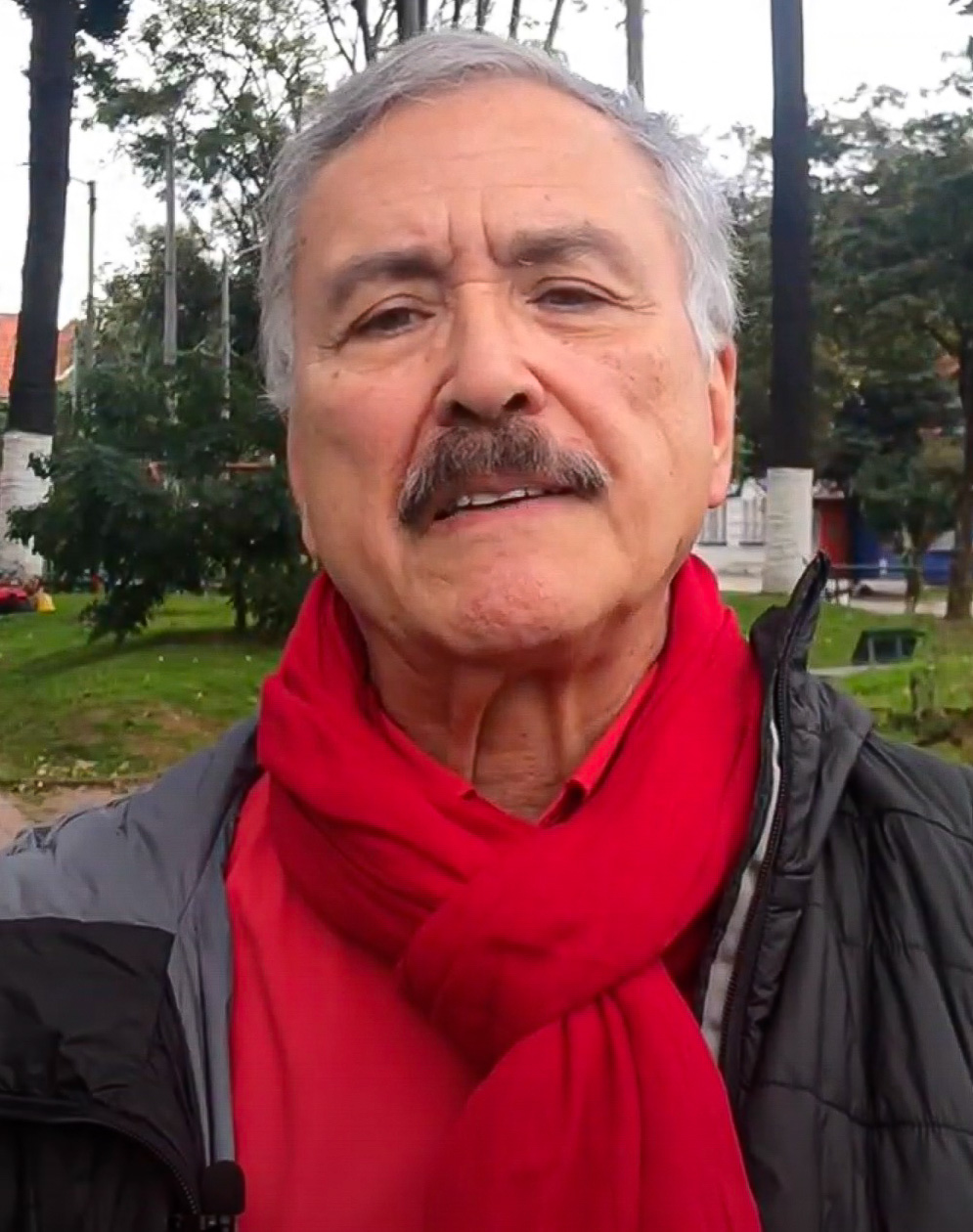

President of the Colombian Communist Party
- In office 2022-2025
- Preceded by: Creation of the seat

General Secretary of the Colombian Communist Party
- In office 1994-2022
- Preceded by: Manuel Cepeda Vargas
- Succeeded by: Claudia Flórez Sepúlveda

Councilmember of Bogotá
- In office 2007-2011

Personal details
- Born: September 24, 1944 (age 81) Cali, Colombia
- Party: Colombian Communist Party; Unión Patriótica; Alternative Democratic Pole
- Education: National University of Colombia
- Occupation: Anthropologist, Professor

Jaime Caycedo Turriago (born 24 September 1944, Cali) is an anthropologist and Colombian politician. He was the General Secretary of the Colombian Communist Party (PCC) from 1994 until December 2022, when he assumed the newly created position of the party's president.

Caycedo is a regular contributor to Semanario Voz, the PCC's newspaper, and is a member of the editorial board of the Contexto Latinoamericano magazine.

== Education ==
Caycedo studied anthropology at the National University of Colombia where he was a student leader in the 1970s as part of the Colombian Communist Youth (JUCO), of which he was once General Secretary. Later associated to the university as a professor, he openly participated in faculty unionization efforts there.

== Political career ==
=== Colombian Communist Party ===
Involved with the PCC since the 1980s, Caycedo was a promoter of the Patriotic Union Party during the peace process of the era, which prompted numerous threats and attacks against him. After the death of Manuel Cepeda Vargas in 1994, he was elected General Secretary of the PCC.

The first plenary session of the Central Committee (CC) of the PCC meeting on November 17, 2008, after the conclusion of the sessions of the 20th National Congress, ratified Caycedo as General Secretary of the Party, thus ratifying the work he had done since assuming the position in 1994.

At the 23rd Congress of the PCC, Caycedo left the position of General Secretary, his successor being Claudia Flórez Sepúlveda, the first woman to assume the position. At that congress, the office of president of the party was created, which he was elected to.

=== Alternative Democratic Pole ===
He was a part of the national leadership of the Alternative Democratic Pole. In 2007, he was elected a council member of Bogotá, with the second-highest vote in the party and the highest in the city. He held the position until 2011.
