= PC3 (disambiguation) =

PC3 may refer to:

- PC3, a prostate cancer cell line
- Paul Colman Trio, a Christian band
- Prairie Capital Convention Center, a convention center in Springfield, IL, United States
- The Clandestine Colombian Communist Party, an illegal Colombian political party
- DDR3 SDRAM
- Physical Containment Level 3, a research facility certification used in Australasia (third highest of four levels, PC1–PC4)
