= Yira Castro =

Colombian politician (1942–1981)

Councillor of Bogotá
- In office July 20, 1980 – July 9, 1981
- Constituency: Communist

Personal details
- Born: Yira Castro Chadid; February 20, 1942 Sincelejo, Sucre, Colombia
- Died: July 9, 1981 (aged 39) Bogotá, D.C., Colombia
- Party: Communist (1975–1981)
- Spouse: Manuel Cepeda (m. 1960)
- Children: Iván; Maruja
- Occupation: Politician; journalist

Yira Castro Chadid (February 20, 1942 – July 9, 1981) was a Colombian politician and journalist who served as a Councillor of Bogotá from 1980 to 1981. A member of the Colombian Communist Party, she worked as an official for the International union of students and as a correspondent for the Czechoslovak press agency.

== Biography ==
Castro was born in Sincelejo, Sucre, on February 20, 1942. She joined the Colombian Communist Youth in 1958 and was a member of the International Union of Students. At 18, she met Manuel Cepeda, whom she married in 1960. The couple had two children, Iván and Maruja. After her marriage to Manuel Cepeda Vargas, the couple became prominent figures in communist circles of Bogotá. In March 1964, they both participated in the Conference of the Latin American Solidarity Organization in Havana, Cuba. In June of the same year, she was imprisoned in El Buen Pastor prison in Bogotá after being arrested during a public demonstration.

Castro died on July 9, 1981, after battling a malignant disease for several months.
