= 1943 Colombian parliamentary election =

Congressional elections were held in Colombia in February 1943 to elect the Chamber of Representatives. The Liberal Party received the most votes.

== Results ==
=== Chamber of Representatives ===
Party	Votes	%	Seats
Colombian Liberal Party	568,317	64.39	84
Colombian Conservative Party	298,644	33.84	44
Colombian Communist Party	15,686	1.78	3
Other parties	15,686	1.78	0
Total	882,647	100.00	131
Source: Nohlen, Abente et al.

=== Senate ===
Party	Seats
Colombian Liberal Party	41
Colombian Conservative Party	22
Total	63
Source: Abente ''et al''.
