= PCCC =

PCCC may refer to:

- Clandestine Colombian Communist Party (Spanish: Partido Comunista Colombiano Clandestino)
- Parallel concatenated convolutional code, a code used in UMTS
- Passaic County Community College, a community college in New Jersey
- Peoria Charter Coach Company, a bus company in Illinois
- Permanent Commission of the FIDE for Chess Compositions (sometimes called just Permanent Commission for Chess Compositions)
- Prairie Capital Convention Center, a convention center in Springfield, IL, United States
- Primary, Community and Continuing Care, a section of the Irish Health Service Executive
- Programmable Controller Communication Commands, a network protocol employed in some industry control networks
- Progressive Change Campaign Committee, a political action committee in the United States
- Providence Continuing Care Centre, one of the three university hospitals in Kingston, Ontario
- Police and Customs Cooperation Centre, common centres established on the internal or external borders of European Union countries with their neighbouring countries.
