= 1949 Colombian parliamentary election =

Parliamentary elections were held in Colombia on 5 June 1949 to elect the Chamber of Representatives. The result was a victory for the Liberal Party, which won 69 of the 132 seats.

== Results ==
Party	Votes	%	Seats	+/–
Colombian Liberal Party	937,600	53.52	69	–4
Colombian Conservative Party	806,759	46.05	63	+5
Social Democratic Party	6,747	0.39	0	0
Other parties	698	0.04	0	–
Total	1,751,804	100.00	132	+1
Registered voters/turnout	2,773,804	–		
Source: Nohlen
