= Revolutionary Socialist Party (Colombia) =

Political party in Colombia (1926-1930)

Revolutionary Socialist Party Partido Socialista Revolucionario
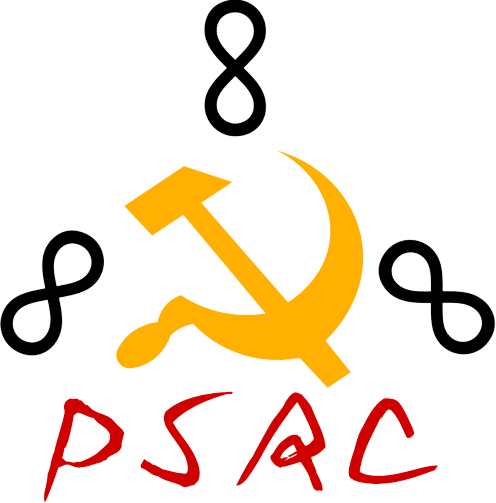
- Abbreviation: PSRC
- Founder: María Cano
- Founded: December 1926
- Dissolved: 17 July 1930
- Succeeded by: Colombian Communist Party
- Ideology: Socialism; Marxism; Communism
- Political position: Left-wing

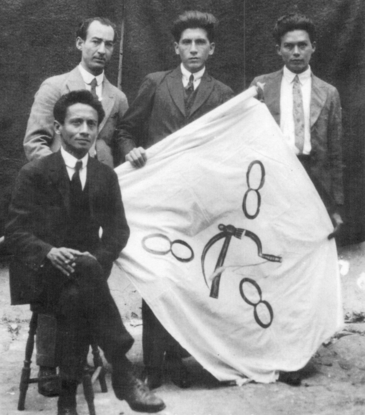
Raúl Eduardo Mahecha, Floro Piedrahita, Julio Buriticá, and Ricardo Elías López of the Revolutionary Socialist Party, pose with its flag of the three '8's: 8 hours of work, 8 hours of study, and 8 hours of rest (c. 1927).

The Revolutionary Socialist Party (Spanish: Partido Socialista Revolucionario, PSR or PSRC) was a left-wing Colombian political party that existed from 1926 to 1930. Co-founded by María Cano, it was one of the first stable Marxist political parties in Colombia. It was the predecessor to the modern Colombian Communist Party, formed in 1930.

== History ==
The Revolutionary Socialist Party was founded in 1926 during the Third National Worker's Congress, with origins in the Confederation of Workers of Colombia, as well as peasant, tenant, and indigenous groups. Its leadership was composed mostly of peasants with intellectuals, workers, and small landowners as well.

In 1927, its first National Convention was held in La Dorada, Caldas. Its entire leadership, being arrested by the police prior to the Convention, ended up instead holding a meeting in the municipality's prison.

Among its members were María Cano, Tomás Uribe Márquez, Felipe Lleras Camargo, Ignacio Torres Giraldo, Gilberto Vieira White, and José Gonzalo Sánchez.

The failure of the 1928 banana strike in Ciénaga, Magdalena combined with the 1930 recession plunged the party into a deep crisis that led to its practical division. Although PSRC co-founder María Cano was not present, she was charged with conspiracy and imprisoned for the strike.

On 17 July 1930, the expanded plenary of the party's Central Committee officially renamed the party to the Colombian Communist Party, now a member of Communist International. This initiated a campaign of bolshevikzation, from which María Cano and Tomás Uribe Márquez would emerge as party leaders.

== See also ==
- Communism in Colombia
