= United Fruit Company strike (1913) =

- Part of Labor Unions
- Date: June 2, 1913 (113 years ago)
- Location: United States

Parties
MTW Union; Striking workers	United Fruit Company

Casualties and losses
At least 2 deaths	

The United Fruit Company strike of 1913 started on June 2, 1913. It was a worker-led strike organized by the Industrial Workers of the World (IWW) in New Orleans against the United Fruit Company that was marked by violence.

On June 13, 1913, an attempt to stop the loading of a ship by strikebreakers turned violent as police officers and private security guards opened fire on the strikers, killing two and wounding several.

The strike was one of a series of strikes that were led by workers in other port cities, most notability in Philadelphia with the Marine Transport Workers Union. Most of these strikes were successful; however, the strike was a failure in New Orleans.

== See also ==
- Banana Massacre
