= María Cano =

Colombian poet, writer, and activist (1887–1967)

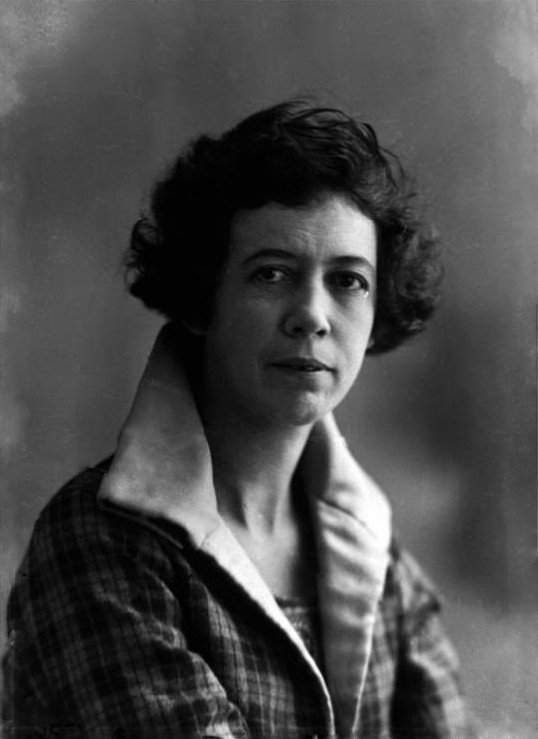
- Born: María de los Ángeles Cano Márquez; August 12, 1887; Medellín
- Died: April 26, 1967 (aged 79); Medellín
- Occupation: Political activist
- Years active: 1925–1930
- Known for: First female Colombian political leader

María de los Ángeles Cano Márquez (Medellín 12 August 1887 – Ibid. 26 April 1967) was a Colombian poet, writer, and activist who was the country's first female political leader. Given the name "Flor del trabajo" (Flower of Labor), Cano led the struggle for civil and labor rights in Colombia. She was the leader of several workers' strikes and a co-founder of the Revolutionary Socialist Party.

== Early life and education ==
Cano was born on 12 August 1887 in Medellín in Antioquia Department to Don Rodolfo Cano and Dona Amelia Márquez, both educated and influential Radical Liberals. She had two sisters. She was educated in secular, rather than Catholic, schools. Colombian women weren't permitted to attend university at the time. Both of Cano's parents died when she was 23.

== Career ==
Cano participated in a literary circle and magazine called Cyrano with other intellectuals from Medellín. By 1922, she was working for the newspaper El correo liberal ("The Liberal Mail"). Her writing and poetry had an "intimate and erotic" tone. In March 1924, she expressed a desire to open a free public library, inviting newspapers and bookstores to donate materials, and by May a municipal library had begun.

Cano was involved in political circles influenced by the Bolshevik Revolution and became a socialist. She abandoned writing purely for artistic reasons and became a social activist and revolutionary leader. As well as providing food and clothing to people in need, she did readings at the library to raise cultural awareness among workers. She visited factories and began denouncing the unfair working conditions and organizing strikes.

On 1 May 1925, Colombia's Labor Day, Cano was given the name the "Labor flower of Medellín", an honorific title usually given to charity workers that she used as a political platform. She became a symbol for rebellious women, with "parents in Antioquia [seeking] to prevent their daughters from becoming mariacanos."

From 1925 to 1927, Cano made seven tours of the country. Her first rallies were held at the mines of Sevilla and Remedios. She was instrumental in the liberation of Raúl Eduardo Mahecha. In 1926, the National Workers Confederation gave her the responsibility of organizing Antioquia's representation at the Third Labor Congress. At the congress she interviewed the government secretary, calling for the release of political prisoners Vicente Adame and Manuel Quintín Lame, making her the first women to occupy a leadership position in a political organization in Colombia. She was declared the "Labor flower of Colombia". She was instrumental in the founding of the Socialist Revolutionary Party in 1926. She spoke out against the death penalty alongside former President Carlos Eugenio Restrepo.

Cano was arrested numerous times and placed under police surveillance. Several of her rallies were broken up by the police in riot gear. She spoke out against social injustice among the elite, the government's repression of opposition, and the practices of US companies.

Cano co-founded the party newspaper, La justicia, and wrote for numerous other publications. In 1928, she led the fight against the government's ley heroica, a law designed to suppress communism. She also supported Nicaraguan leader Augusto César Sandino against the invasion of US troops. In November 1928, a strike of banana plantation workers culminated in a massacre of workers at a demonstration at Ciénaga, Magdalena on 6 December. Although Cano was not present, she was charged with conspiracy and imprisoned. She became politically isolated after an ideological split in the socialist ranks and was unsuccessful in a 1934 attempt at returning to politics.

Cano left Bogotá and worked for the Antioquia State Press in Medellín. The Medellín Women's Alliance recognised her contributions in 1945. In 1960 she was appointed as the speaker for the Democratic Organization of Antioquia Women.

== Personal life ==
Cano lived with communist writer and orator Ignacio Torres Giraldo.

== Death and legacy ==
The logo of Fundación Universitaria María Cano, a private university named after Cano

Cano died in Medellín on 26 April 1967 at the age of 79.

In 1990, Camila Loboguerrero directed a Colombian film called Maria Cano, starring Maria Eugenia Dávila as Cano filmed in Salamina-Caldas.

In Antioquia, there is a street, two schools and a university named after Cano. In 1991, the labor organization The Flor del Trabajo Association was created in Funza. Its name was changed on 23 March 2013 to the Association Maria Cano.
