= Social and Political Front =

Social and Political Front Frente Social y Político
- Abbreviation: FSP
- Founder: Luis Eduardo Garzón
- Registered: 1999
- Ideology: Democratic socialism Trotskyism; Communism
- Political position: Left-wing
- Parties: Colombian Communist Party; Patriotic Union; Present for Socialism

The Social and Political Front (Spanish: Frente Social y Político, FSP) was a political coalition of several left wing parties in Colombia. Its creation was proposed by Luis Eduardo Garzón in 1999 at the Central Unitary Workers' Union (CUT) Congress in opposition to the Andrés Pastrana government and two party political monopoly.

In 2005, it was part of the wider Democratic Alternative (AD) movement, which in 2006 joined the Independent Democratic Pole (PDI) in order to create the Alternative Democratic Pole (PDA) alliance. They supported Carlos Gaviria Díaz for the presidency.

== Participants ==
Parties and organizations affiliated with the coalition included the Colombian Communist Party, Present for Socialism, Poder y Unidad Popular, Gustavo Marín Workers Collective, Movement for the Defense of the Rights of the People (MODEP), the Patriotic Union (UP), and several unions and social organizations.

=== Notable members ===
- Luis Eduardo Garzón
- Wilson Borja
- Carlos Gaviria Díaz
- Alexander López
- Alejo Vargas
- Alfredo Molano
- Lorenzo Muelas
- Gloria Cuartas
- Orlando Fals Borda
- Daniel García Peña

== Political Development ==
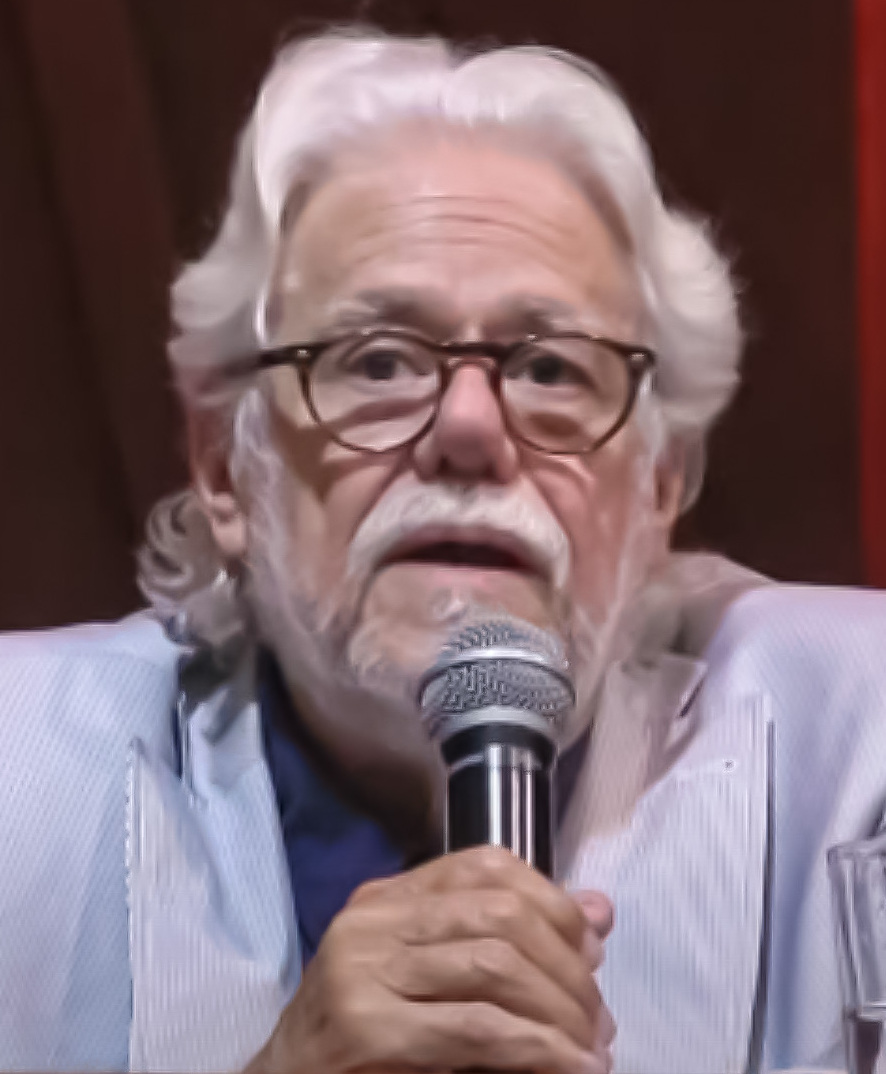
Carlos Gaviria Díaz, FSP senator.

In the March 10th 2002 legislative election, the coalition won parliamentary representation as one of the many small parties who participated. It won two seats in the Chamber, with Wilson Borja and Alexander López, and one in the Senate, with Former Chief Magistrate of Colombia's Constitutional Court Carlos Gaviria Díaz.

Senator Gaviria Díaz, a member of the FSP, was chosen as Democratic Alternative's presidential pre-candidate.

In March 2006, the AD and the PDI subsequently decided on a common candidate for that year's May 28 elections, selecting Carlos Gaviria over the PDI's Antonio Navarro.
