= Anarchism in Colombia =

Anarchism in Colombia was a political movement that emerged from the disparate social movements of the 19th-century, becoming an organized force in the 1910s and 1920s. After a period of recession, the movement re-emerged in the late 20th century, with the rise of counter-cultural, left-wing and indigenous resistance movements.

== History ==
=== Origins ===
Throughout the 19th century, utopian socialism emerged in Colombia as part of the artisans' movement against free trade. Anarchism didn't surface as an organized movement until 1910, when Colombian students, artists and workers began to take up the ideas themselves.

=== Anarcho-syndicalism and the workers' movement ===
The first public expression of anarchism was made during the Barranquilla strike of 1910, in which militant anarchist workers participated. The first workers' organizations in Colombia were formed by anarcho-syndicalists in the early 1910s: including the formation of the Unión Obrera in 1913. Anarcho-syndicalists subsequently organized a number of actions, such as a workers' demonstration on May 15, 1916, and the Cartagena port workers' strike of 1920. By 1918, a broad workers' movement has developed throughout Colombia, particularly in Barranquilla, Cartagena and Santa Marta, with a strike being organized by banana workers of the United Fruit Company for the first time. This was followed in 1919 with a strike by the railway workers of Girardot, as well as a workers' strike in the capital of Bogotá. In 1924 and 1927, strikes were organized by workers of the Tropical Oil Company in Barrancabermeja, but this ultimately resulted in 1,200 workers being fired and the government declaring war against the strike's organizers. By 1925, Colombian anarcho-syndicalists began to publish periodicals, such as Voz Popular, Organización and Via Libre. However, after the Banana Massacre of 1928, any anarchist activities or apolitical unionist struggles in Colombia largely ceased, due in part to the state's repression and the rise of Bolshevism.

=== Later incarnations ===
Anarchist ideas saw a resurgence with the Nadaist movement of the early 1960s. As a counter-cultural movement which drew from the philosophies of existentialism and nihilism, it came as a reaction to the La Violencia, a civil war between Colombian liberals and conservatives, as well as the military dictatorship of Gustavo Rojas Pinilla.

In the 21st century, Colombian anarchists maintain social centers, a presence in the Colombian punk scene, some social programs, and the occasional organized protest and resistance actions.

== See also ==
- Category:Colombian anarchists
- List of anarchist movements by region
- Communism in Colombia

== Bibliography ==
- Cappelletti, Angel J. (2018). Anarchism in Latin America. Translated by Gabirel Palmer-Fernández. Edinburgh: AK Press. pp. 203–207. ISBN 9781849352826. OCLC 1044939183.
