= Revolutionary Communist Group of Colombia =

Colombian political organisation

Revolutionary Communist Group of Colombia Grupo Comunista Revolucionario de Colombia
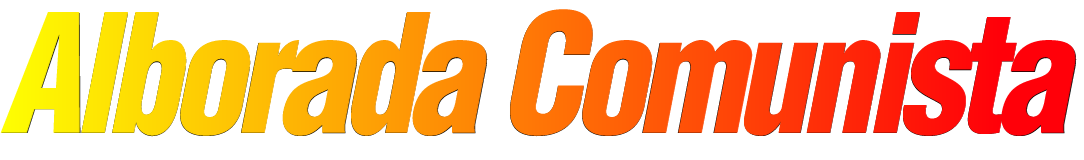
- Leader: Collective leadership
- Founded: 1980
- Newspaper: Alborada Comunista
- Youth wing: The Red Guards
- Ideology: Communism; Marxism–Leninism–Maoism; Anti-revisionism; New Synthesis
- Political position: Far-Left
- International affiliation: none (2006–current); Revolutionary Internationalist Movement (1986–2006)

Website
- comrev.co

Revolutionary Communist Group of Colombia (Spanish: Grupo Comunista Revolucionario de Colombia) (RCGC) is a Marxist-Leninist-Maoist group in Colombia. It was founded in 1982, by a group originating in the Marxist–Leninist League of Colombia. It is a founding member of the Revolutionary Internationalist Movement.
