= Union of Patriotic Youth =

Unión de Jóvenes Patriotas (Union of Patriotic Youth) was the youth organization of the Colombian leftist formation Patriotic Union (UP).

== History ==
Like the main UP party, the UJP was severely persecuted by the agents of drug lords, paramilitaries and rogue elements inside the Colombian military during the 1980s. Many left-wing groups in Colombia have denounced the extermination of the UP and the UJP as part of a politically motivated strategy emanating from powerful sectors of Colombian society, including drug lords and some members of the traditional socioeconomic elites, which would have counted with the passive or active collaboration of several officers within the Colombian military and allegedly the indifference or tacit approval from contemporary administrations, in particular that of Virgilio Barco Vargas.

No proven direct links between the murders of UP members and high-ranking Colombian officials have been uncovered, though there is some documented evidence of the existence of organized meetings concerning the subject of the UP between drug lords, paramilitaries and lower-to-medium ranking military individuals at the time. Several drug mafia or paramilitary hitmen and lower-ranking military officials which directly cooperated with illegal death squads at the time were prosecuted for some of the killings, though the vast majority of the cases have remained unresolved. Among the few intellectual co-authors of the extermination campaign which have been identified with a relatively clear degree of certainty are drug lords (such as José Gonzalo Rodriguez Gacha) and paramilitary leaders (such as Carlos Castaño Gil, by his own admission).

The UJP was a member of World Federation of Democratic Youth, and was disbanded in the early 1990s.
