= Commons (Colombia) =

Colombian political party

Commons Comunes
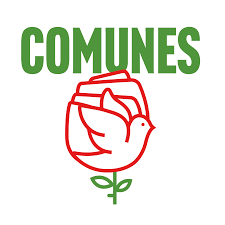
- President: Rodrigo Londoño
- Founded: 1 September 2017
- Legalised: 31 October 2017
- Preceded by: FARC; MBNC; PCCC
- Youth wing: Jóvenes del Común
- Women's and LGBT wing: Comuneras - Mujeres y Diversidades
- Ideology: Marxism; Progressivism; Feminism
- National affiliation: Historic Pact for Colombia
- Regional affiliation: São Paulo Forum
- Colors: Red; Green; White
- Chamber of Representatives: 0 / 188
- Senate: 0 / 108
- Governors: 0 / 32
- Mayors: 0 / 1,102

Website
- Comunes

The Commons (Spanish: Comunes), previously Common Alternative Revolutionary Force (Spanish: Fuerza Alternativa Revolucionaria del Común, FARC) until 24 January 2021, is a political party in Colombia, established in 2017 as the political successor of the former rebel group the Revolutionary Armed Forces of Colombia (FARC). The peace accords agreed upon by the Revolutionary Armed Forces of Colombia and the Colombian government in 2016 provided for the FARC's participation in politics as a legal, registered political party following its successful disarmament.

The party was founded after a failed referendum in October 2016 with the majority of Colombian voters voting to reject the peace agreement. The "yes" campaign to accept the peace negotiations were pushed by President Juan Manuel Santos, while the "no" campaign to reject the agreement was backed by former president Álvaro Uribe. The "no" vote won with 50.2% of the vote. The failed referendum came after four years of peace negotiations. After mild alterations to the peace agreements, the government approved the new deal by pushing it through Congress. This has led to some controversy with those who voted no arguing that the deal offered too much leniency.

In the 2026 Colombian parliamentary election, the party's 17 candidates all lost, while it also failed to reach the threshold to retain its legal recognition.

== Founding Congress ==
The party's founding congress was held in the Bogota Convention Centre from August 28 to August 31, 2017 with the participation of one thousand delegates, including former FARC militants and members of the Colombian Clandestine Communist Party, as well as some 200 invitees from various sectors of Colombian society and delegations from left-wing groups in other countries, primarily those in Latin America and the Caribbean. The congress concluded on September 1 with the unveiling of the new party in Bogotá's Plaza Bolívar, with over ten thousand people in attendance. In his speech, party leader Timoleón Jiménez put forth a proposal for a national transition government for the 2018–2022 term.

The National Directorate is made up of 111 members. In total, 26 women were elected, representing 23% of the new party's leadership.

The party's original name, chosen to maintain the acronym FARC used by its armed predecessor, was agreed upon on 31 August 2017 during the party's founding congress, prevailing over the other proposed name, Nueva Colombia ("New Colombia") by 628 votes. The party's logo, a design with a rose and a red star in the center, was revealed at the same time.

== Goals ==
Comunes will have 10 automatic seats in Congress (5 each in the Senate and Chamber of Representatives) through 2026 per the deal reached via the accord. They will continue to attempt to fight poverty and corruption, specifically in rural areas, focusing on land reform. They are looking to form a coalition with other communist groups to gain additional seats in Congress, as they remain ideologically Marxist.

== Election results ==
=== House of Representatives ===
Election year	# of overall votes	% of overall vote	Rank	# of overall seats won	+/–	Status
2018	32,636	0.2%	21st	5 / 172	New	Opposition
2022	21,423	0.13%	34th	5 / 172	0	Government

=== Senate ===
Election year	Votes	%	Rank	Seats	+/–	Status
2018	52,532	0.36%	14th	5 / 108	New	Opposition
2022	25,708	0.15%	15th	5 / 108	0	Government
2026	With FC		15th	0 / 108	▼5	Extra-parliamentary

== See also ==
- Clandestine Colombian Communist Party
- Patriotic March
- Patriotic Union
