= Proletarian Line =

Communist group in Colombia

Proletarian Line (Spanish: Línea Proletaria) was a communist group in Colombia. It emerged from the Carlos Alberto Morales Regional Committee (based in the coffee districts) of the Communist Party of Colombia (Marxist-Leninist) (PCC(ML)), which had broken away from the mother party in 1976. The leader of the group was Julio Bedoya. Linea Proletaria strived for the build-up of an 'independent political labour movement', and less focus on armed struggle than PCC(ML).

In 1982 the group merged into the Revolutionary Unification Movement - Marxist-Leninist.
