= Communist Labour Party (Colombia) =

Defunct Colombian political party

Communist Labour Party Partido Comunista Obrero
- General Secretary: Augusto Durán
- Founded: 1947
- Split from: Colombian Communist Party

The Communist Labour Party (Spanish: Partido Comunista Obrero, abbreviated PCO) was a political party in Colombia. The party was led by Augusto Durán and was born out of a right-wing split in the Colombian Communist Party in mid-1947. Durán, who had been the general secretary of the Communist Party, and his followers had wanted that the Communist Party would support the presidential candidature of Jorge Eliécer Gaitán. Durán became the general secretary of PCO. The PCO published Clase Obrera. The PCO became short-lived, after three years most PCO members had rejoined the Communist Party.
