= Carlos Cortés Vargas =

Colombian general (1883–1954)

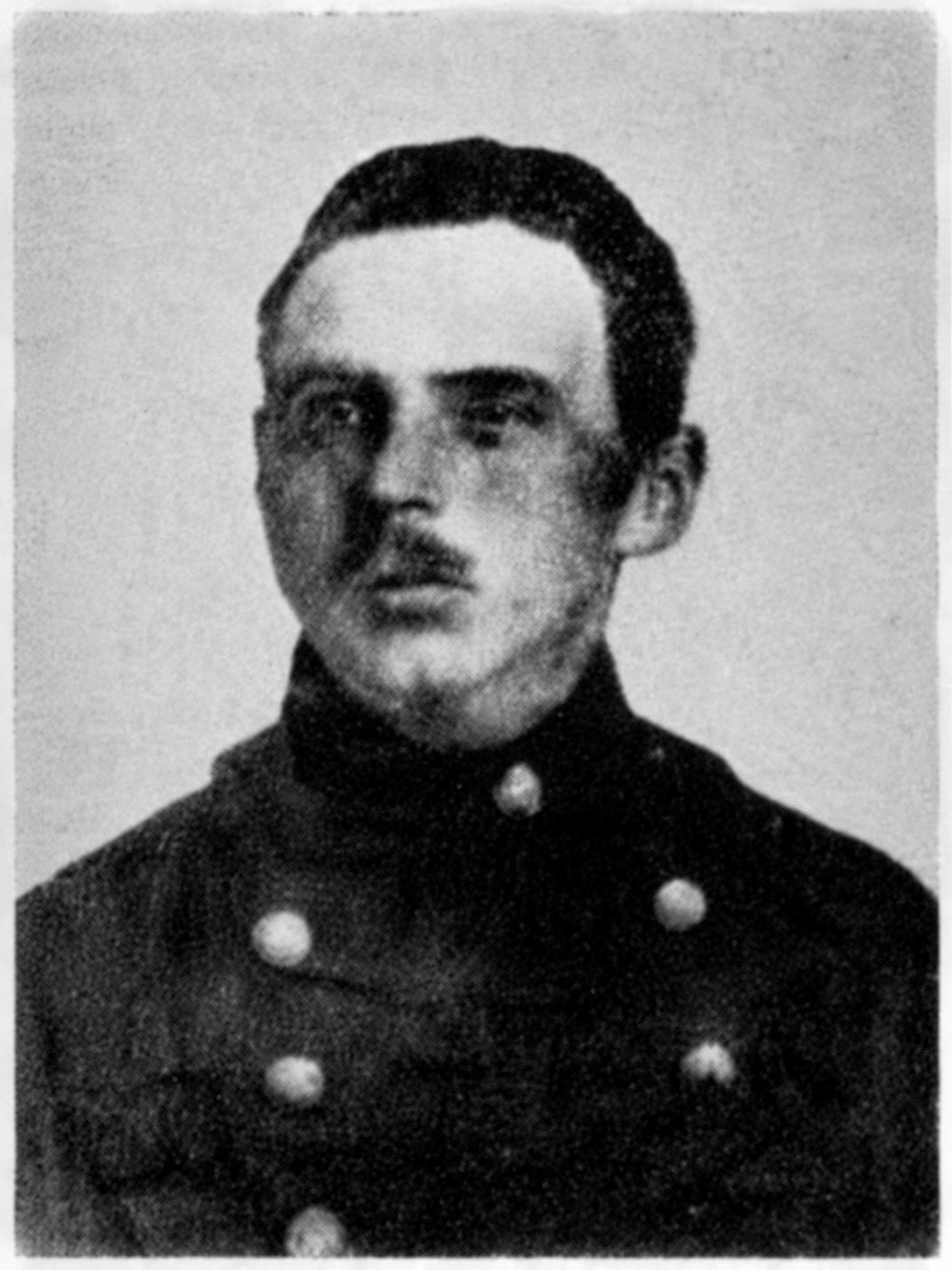
Cortés Vargas in December 1928 (El Tiempo)

Carlos Cortés Vargas (Note: In this name that follows Hispanic American naming customs, the first or paternal surname is Cortés and the second or maternal family name is Vargas.) (1883–1954) was a Colombian general, most noted for ordering the Santa Marta massacre (commonly called the "Banana massacre") in response to a strike by United Fruit workers in 1928. Cortés took responsibility for 47 casualties, but the exact number of casualties will probably never be known. Herrera Soto, co-author of the most comprehensive and detailed study of the 1928 strike, has put together the various estimates given by contemporaries and historians, ranging from 47 to 2,000.

General Cortés, who issued the order to shoot, argued later that he had issued the order because he had information that American boats were poised to land troops on Colombian coasts to defend American personnel and the interests of the United Fruit Company. Cortés issued the order so the US would not invade Colombia. This position was strongly criticized in the Senate, especially by Jorge Eliécer Gaitán, who argued that those same bullets should have been used to stop the foreign invader.

== See also ==
- Banana massacre
