= Banana Massacre =

1928 mass killing of striking United Fruit Company workers in Ciénaga, Colombia

Banana Massacre Masacre de las bananeras
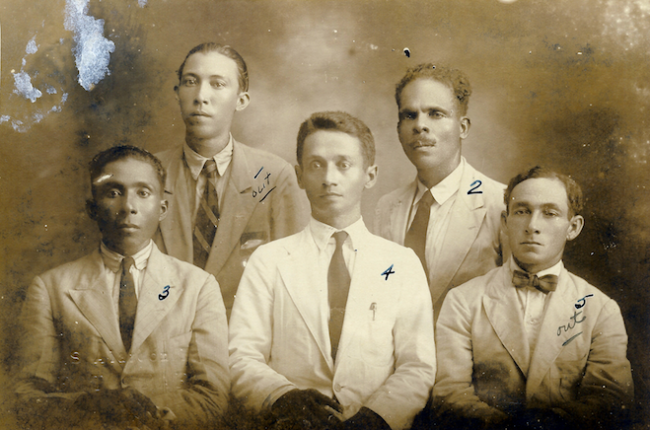
- Leaders of the banana plantation workers' strike. From left to right: Pedro M. del Río, Bernardino Guerrero, Raúl Eduardo Mahecha, Nicanor Serrano and Erasmo Coronell. Guerrero and Coronell were killed during the massacre.
- Location: 11.0108°N 74.2517°W; Ciénaga, Colombia
- Date: December 5 and 6, 1928
- Attack type: Strike crackdown
- Deaths: 47−2,000 killed
- Victim: United Fruit Company workers
- Perpetrator: Colombian Army: General Carlos Cortés Vargas

The Banana Massacre (Spanish: Matanza/Masacre de las bananeras) was a massacre of workers of the United Fruit Company (now Chiquita) that occurred between December 5 and 6, 1928, in the town of Ciénaga near Santa Marta, Colombia. A strike began on November 12, 1928, when the workers ceased to work until the company would reach an agreement with them to grant them dignified working conditions. After several weeks with no agreement, in which the United Fruit Company refused to negotiate with the workers, the government of Miguel Abadía Méndez assigned Carlos Cortés Vargas as military chief in the Magdalena department and sent 700 men from the Colombian Army to quell the strikers, resulting in the massacre of 47–2000 people (the range owing to the insufficiency of detailed historical records).

U.S. officials in Colombia and United Fruit representatives portrayed the workers' strike as "communist" with a "subversive tendency" in telegrams to Frank B. Kellogg, the United States Secretary of State. The Colombian government was also compelled to work for the interests of the company, considering they could cut off trade of Colombian bananas with significant markets such as the United States and Europe.

== Strike ==
A decade before the massacre, workers had gone on strike but had seen little change. The workers made nine demands from the United Fruit Company in October 1928:

1. Stop their practice of hiring through sub-contractors
2. Mandatory collective insurance
3. Compensation for work accidents
4. Hygienic dormitories and 6-day work weeks
5. Increase in daily pay for workers who earned less than 100 pesos per month
6. Weekly wage
7. Abolition of office stores
8. Abolition of payment through coupons rather than money
9. Improvement of hospital services

The workers of the banana plantations in Colombia went on strike on November 12, 1928. The strike turned into the largest labor movement ever witnessed in the country until then, as 25,000 workers, at the minimum, from the United Fruit Company participated. Radical members of the Liberal Party, as well as members of the Socialist and Communist Parties, participated.

The workers wanted to be recognized as employees, and demanded the implementation of the Colombian legal framework of the 1920s.

== Massacre ==
An army regiment from Bogotá was dispatched by the government to deal with the strikers, which it deemed to be subversive. Whether these troops were sent in at the behest of the United Fruit Company did not at first clearly emerge.

Three hundred soldiers were sent from Antioquia to Magdalena. There were no soldiers from Magdalena involved because General Carlos Cortés Vargas, the army-appointed military chief of the banana zone in charge of controlling the situation, did not believe they would be able to take effective actions, as they might be related to the plantation workers.

On the day of the massacre, December 5, 1928, about 1,500 banana workers along with their families camped out in the town square of Ciénaga. While this was happening, the troops set up their machine guns on the roofs of the low buildings at the corners of the main square, closed off the access streets, and, after issuing a five-minute warning that people should leave, opened fire into a dense Sunday crowd of workers and their families, including children. The people had gathered after Sunday Mass to wait for an anticipated address from the governor.

== Number of people dead ==
General Carlos Cortés Vargas, who commanded the troops during the massacre, took responsibility for 47 casualties. In reality, the exact number of casualties has never been confirmed. Herrera Soto, co-author of a comprehensive and detailed study of the 1928 strike, has put together various estimates given by contemporaries and historians, ranging from 47 to as high as 2,000. According to Congressman Jorge Eliécer Gaitán, the killed strikers were thrown into the sea. Other sources claim that the bodies were buried in mass graves.

Among the survivors was Luis Vicente Gámez, later a famous local figure, who survived by hiding under a bridge for three days. Every year after the massacre he delivered a memorial service over the radio.

The press has reported different numbers of deaths and different opinions about the events that took place that night. The conclusion is that there is no agreed-on story, but rather diverse variations depending on the source they come from. The American press provided biased information on the strike. The Colombian press was also biased depending on the political alignment of the publication. For example, the Bogotá-based newspaper El Tiempo stated that the workers were within their rights in wanting to improve their conditions. However, since the newspaper was politically conservative, they also noted that they did not agree with the strike.

== Official United States telegrams ==
Telegram from Bogotá Embassy to the U.S. Secretary of State, Frank B. Kellogg, dated December 5, 1928, stated:

I have been following Santa Marta fruit strike through United Fruit Company representative here; also through Minister of Foreign Affairs who on Saturday told me government would send additional troops and would arrest all strike leaders and transport them to a prison in Cartagena; that government would give adequate protection to American interests involved.

Telegram from Santa Marta Consulate to the U.S. Secretary of State, dated December 6, 1928, stated:

Feeling against the Government by the proletariat which is shared by some of the soldiers is high and it is doubtful if we can depend upon the Colombian Government for protection. May I respectfully suggest that my request for the presence within calling distance of an American warship be granted and that it stand off subject to my call ... It is admitted that the character of the strike has changed and that the disturbance is a manifestation with a subversive tendency.

Telegram from Bogotá Embassy to the U.S. Secretary of State, dated December 7, 1928, stated:

Situation outside Santa Marta City unquestionably very serious: outside zone is in revolt; military who have orders "not to spare ammunition" have already killed and wounded about fifty strikers. Government now talks of general offensive against strikers as soon as all troopships now on the way arrive early next week.

Telegram from the U.S. Department of State to Santa Marta Consulate, dated December 8, 1928, stated:

The Legation at Bogota reports that categorical orders have been given the authorities at Santa Marta to protect all American interests. The Department does not (repeat not) desire to send a warship to Santa Marta. Keep the Department informed of all developments by telegraph.

Telegram from Santa Marta Consulate to the U.S. Secretary of State, dated December 9, 1928, stated:

Troop train from banana zone just arrived in Santa Marta with all American citizens. No Americans killed or wounded. Guerrilla warfare now continuing in the zone but military forces are actively engaged in clearing the district of the Communists.

Dispatch from Santa Marta Consulate to the U.S. Secretary of State, dated December 11, 1928, stated:

Looting and killing was carried on from the moment the announcement of a state of Martial Law was made and the fact that the American residents in the Zone came out of it alive is due to the defense they put up for six hours when they held off the mob that was bent upon killing them. I was justified in calling for help and I shall welcome the opportunity to defend the position that I took on the morning of the sixth and until the afternoon of the eighth.

Dispatch from Bogotá Embassy to the U.S. Secretary of State, dated December 11, 1928, stated:

The opposition press, that is, the press of the Liberal Party, is conducting a violent campaign against the Government for the methods used in breaking up the strike, and is bandying ugly words about, especially referring to the Minister of War and the military forces, words such as murderer and assassin being used. Although the thinking people of the country realize that it was only the Government's prompt action that diverted a disaster, this insidious campaign of the Liberal press will undoubtedly work up a great deal of feeling against the Government and will tend to inculcate in the popular mind a belief that the Government was unduly hasty in protecting the interests of the United Fruit Company. The Conservative journals are defending the Government's course but I doubt that their counter-fire will suffice to do away with the damage the Liberal journals are causing.

Dispatch from U.S. Bogotá Embassy to the U.S. Secretary of State, dated December 29, 1928, stated:

I have the honor to report that the legal advisor of the United Fruit Company here in Bogotá stated yesterday that the total number of strikers killed by the Colombian military authorities during the recent disturbance reached between five and six hundred; while the number of soldiers killed was one.

Dispatch from U.S. Bogotá Embassy to the U.S. Secretary of State, dated January 16, 1929, stated:

I have the honor to report that the Bogotá representative of the United Fruit Company told me yesterday that the total number of strikers killed by the Colombian military exceeded 1000.

== In popular culture ==
Gabriel García Márquez depicted a fictional version of the massacre in his novel One Hundred Years of Solitude, as did Álvaro Cepeda Samudio in his La Casa Grande. Although García Márquez references the number of dead as around 3000, the actual number of dead workers is unknown.

The event also inspired Italian singer-songwriter Francesco De Gregori's song "Ninetto e la colonia", released with his 1976 album Bufalo Bill. Before the soldiers start shooting on the frightened and praying crowd, only Ninetto scemo, a silly little child, due to his innocence, is able to ask the relevant question, though in vain: "Who are those who sent you?" The soldier replies that the answer does not matter, as those who sent him do not speak their language and live far away.

== See also ==
- Tlatelolco massacre
- United Fruit Company strike (1913)
