= Presentes por el Socialismo =

Presentes Por el Socialismo (PPS) is a Colombian political party of the left, founded in 1996. Its militants come from different currents including Trotskyism and Marxism-Leninism. It was active part of the foundation of the Social and Political Front (FSP) and Democratic Alternative. As a member of the FSP, it participates in the Alternative Democratic Pole. Its political position is for socialism, the autonomy of the mass organizations and the Marxist alternative to the Capitalist System. It participates in the São Paulo Forum and stands in sympathy with the Trotskyist reunified Fourth International. It has strong bases amongst college students, the trade unions in the banking industry, mass movements and the teaching profession. In the last parliamentary elections it supported the candidacy of the unionist Alexander López Maya to the Senate.
