= Wilson Borja =

Colombian politician (1952–2024)

Member of the Chamber of Representatives of Colombia
- In office 20 July 2002 – 20 July 2010

Personal details
- Born: Wilson Alfonso Borja Díaz; August 29, 1952 Cartagena, Colombia
- Died: August 5, 2024 (aged 71) Bogotá, Colombia
- Party: PDA
- Occupation: Trade unionist

Wilson Alfonso Borja Díaz (29 August 1952 – 5 August 2024) was a Colombian trade unionist and politician. A member of the Alternative Democratic Pole, he served in the Chamber of Representatives from 2002 to 2010.

Borja died of bone marrow cancer in Bogotá, on 5 August 2024, at the age of 71.
