= Silvestre Savitski =

Politician

Silvestre Savitski was a Russian communist, and pioneer in the Colombian socialist movement.

Savitsky was a student in Moscow, when the Soviet government sent him to China to purchase foodgrains. However, Savitsky reportedly lost the money handed to him by the Soviet government playing roulette, and found himself in a position of not being able to return to Russia. He fled to Tokyo, and then to Panama, before finally arriving in Colombia. He settled down in Colombia, and began propagating Bolshevik ideas there. Around him a circle of followers emerged, including José del Mar, Gabriel Turbay and Luis Tejada. The group maintained contacts with the Socialist Party, but retained a separate political identity. Savitsky assisted the May 1, 1924, conference of the Socialist Party, which pledged to follow the 21 theses of the Communist International. In 1925 he was expelled from Colombia, and settled in Mexico where he continued political activities.

Per Lazar/Jeifets (2001) the real intentions behind Savitski's political activities in Colombia, which ran in parallel to different business ventures, could have been opportunistic attempts to clear his name ahead of a possible return to the Soviet Union. The Communist International maintained suspicion against his role.
