= Marxist–Leninist League of Colombia =

The Marxist–Leninist League of Colombia (Spanish: Liga Marxista-Leninista de Colombia, abbreviated 'Liga ML') was a communist group in Colombia. It emerged in late 1971, founded by splinters of the Communist Party of Colombia (Marxist–Leninist) (PCC(ML)) in Antioquia, Nariño, Santander and the Atlantic Coast. Its Political Secretary was Arturo Acero.

Liga ML was active in peasant movements. It did not conduct any military activity.

In 1977 Liga ML took part in the Committee for Unity, together with other revolutionary forces. In 1982 it merged into the New Revolutionary Unification Movement - Marxist-Leninist.
