= Patriotic March =

Colombian political party

Patriotic March (Spanish: Marcha Patriótica) is a left-wing political party based in Bogotá, Colombia. The party was founded on April 21, 2012, by members of multiple socialist parties, such as the Colombian Communist Party. The party's ideology is based on patriotism, socialism, anti-imperialism, anti-capitalism, and bolivarianism. The party is a member of the São Paulo Forum.

The Colombian government claims that the Revolutionary Armed Forces of Colombia has been infiltrating and funding Patriotic March, which has denied the claim.
