= Jaime Pardo Leal =

Colombian politician (1941–1987)

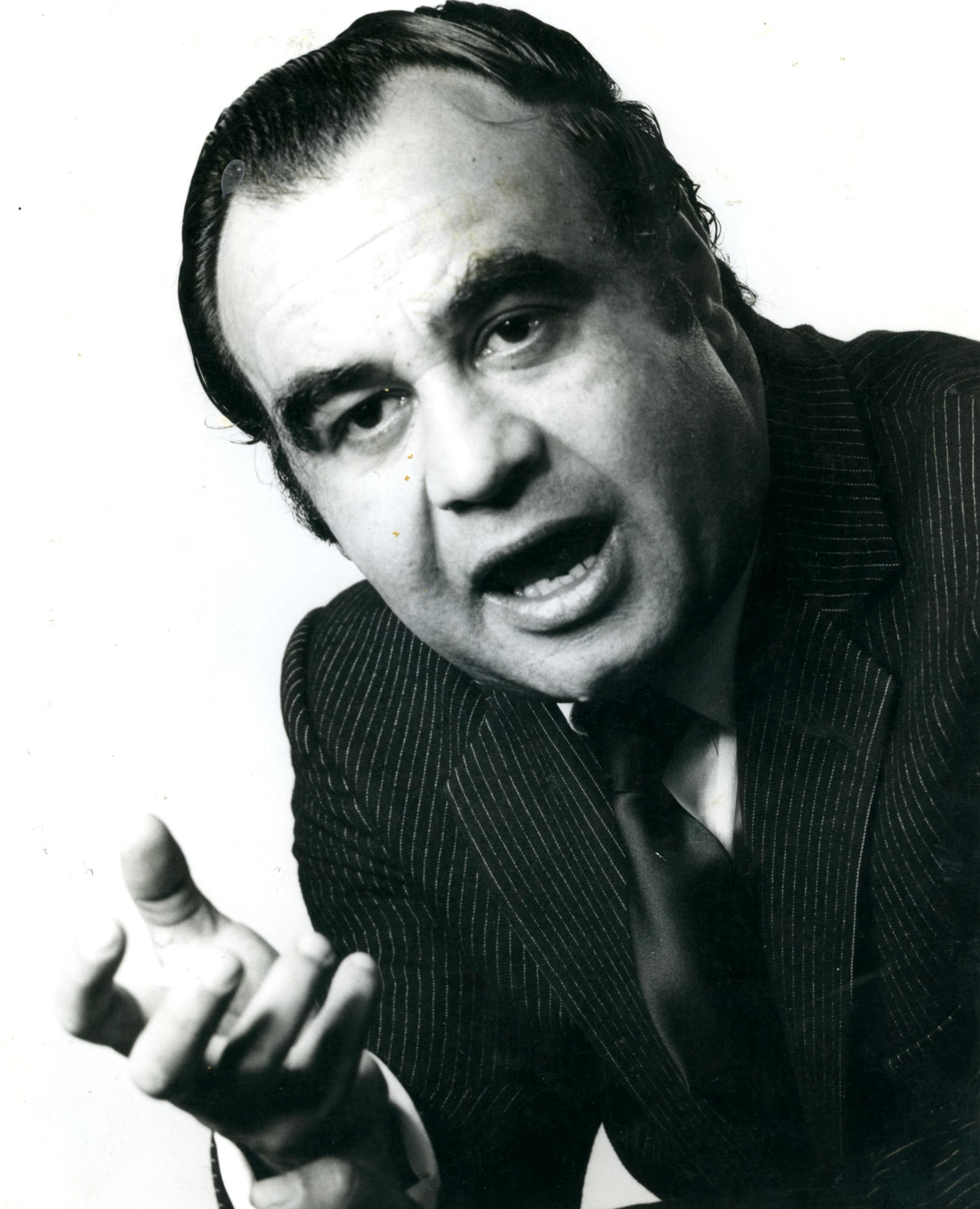
- Born: 28 March 1941; Ubaque, Cundinamarca, Colombia
- Died: 11 October 1987 (aged 46); La Mesa, Cundinamarca, Colombia

Jaime Pardo Leal (March 28, 1941 – October 11, 1987) was a Colombian lawyer, union leader, and politician who ran as candidate of the Patriotic Union party for the presidency of Colombia in the 1986 elections and was later assassinated.

== Biography and political career ==
Pardo Leal studied law in Universidad Nacional de Colombia, where he graduated as a lawyer in 1963. As a student he became active in the Colombian Communist Youth (JUCO) and was an active part in the student movement. After obtaining his degree he started a long career in the judicial branch of the government, where he worked as judge for town and regional courts, and then in the Superior tribunal and as a magistrate in the Superior Tribunal of Bogotá. As such, Pardo Leal was instrumental in the creation of the judicial branch union Asonal Judicial, and leader of many strikes to push for better work conditions for the employees of the judicial branch. This leadership brought him the enmity of many in the branch. This led to his not being reelected as a magistrate, which became the origin for his political aspirations.

Following the peace conversations between the FARC and the government of Belisario Betancur, the Unión Patriótica political party was formed, and Pardo was called as an advisor. At the time, he was also involved in the Colombian Communist Party and in the formation of the Central Union of Workers of Colombia. On February 4, 1986, he decided to make official his aspirations as a presidential candidate for the just formed party. He ended up third, behind Virgilio Barco and Alvaro Gómez Hurtado, with a total of 328.752 votes. The UP party soon became a target for paramilitary organizations who started killing local leaders throughout the country. As party president, Pardo became vocal in denouncing this selective killings and accusing the government of overlooking those crimes, or even committing them. When he started denouncing the collaboration of members of the government and from the military with these assassinations, he became a target as well.

== Assassination ==
By the time of his death, 471 members of UP had already been assassinated throughout the country. According to his obituary from Semana, "Jaime Pardo Leal knew he would be killed. His family knew he would be killed. Patriotic Union knew he would be killed. Journalists knew he would be killed. The whole country knew he would be killed. And finally, he was killed. It was 3:45 in the afternoon on Sunday, October 11." Pardo had received many death threats, and although he initially refused protection from the government he ended up accepting it finally as the threat level increased. On the day of his death he had decided to dispatch his security and kept only one of his bodyguards as he went to his farm in the La Mesa town, near to Bogota. As he drove back to Bogota, men shot at him from another car. Although he was transported immediately to the nearby hospital, he died before he could be helped.

=== Aftermath ===
Four people were convicted for his assassination, brothers William and Jaime Infante, Oliveria Acuña Infante and Beyer Yesid Barrera. William Infante had been released and was then captured and sentenced to life for drug trafficking in the United States. Barrera was captured and condemned to 24 years in prison for the crime. Drug lord José Gonzalo Rodríguez Gacha, also known as "the Mexican", was apparently involved in the murder as a sponsor. The Colombian Communist Party newspaper Voz published a report in which it linked members of the Colombian military to Rodríguez Gacha.

Pardo Leal was replaced by Bernardo Jaramillo Ossa as president of UP. Jaramillo was also assassinated during the presidential campaign of 1990. By 1988, the UP announced that more than 500 of its members, including Pardo Leal and four congressmen, had been assassinated to date. Unidentified gunmen later attacked more than 100 of the UP's local candidates in the six months preceding the March 1988 elections. An April 1988 report by Amnesty International charged that members of the Colombian military and government would be involved in what was called a "deliberate policy of political murder" of UP militants and others. The terms of that accusation were rejected and deemed to be an inaccurate exaggeration by the administration of Virgilio Barco Vargas.

By 2003–2004, the official legal representatives of a partial number of UP victims presented a concrete death toll of about 1,163 to the Inter-American Commission on Human Rights (IACHR), of which 450 (38%) were attributed directly to paramilitary groups. The breakdown of the remainder was not publicly specified.
