= Bernardo Jaramillo Ossa =

Colombian politician (1956–1990)

- Born: September 2, 1956; Manizales, Colombia
- Died: March 22, 1990 (aged 33); Bogotá, Colombia
- Occupations: Politician, president of the Patriotic Union and candidate for the presidency of Colombia 1990–1994
- Political party: Colombian Communist Party (1981–1985); Patriotic Union (1985–1990)

Bernardo Jaramillo Ossa (September 2, 1956 – March 22, 1990) was a Colombian politician and member of the Colombian Communist Party. Jaramillo started working primarily in the Urabá Antioquia region until 1987 when he assumed the presidency of the Patriotic Union Party (UP) after the assassination of Jaime Pardo.

== Youth ==
Bernardo Jaramillo Ossa was born on September 2, 1956 in Manizales, into a poor working family. He was the son of Nydia Ossa Escobar and Bernardo Jaramillo Ríos. He had a sister, Clemencia. He finished his baccalaureate at the Instituto Manizales. Where he actively performed important works for the improvement of student conditions. He graduated as a lawyer at the University of Caldas in June 1981 but he did graduate with degrees in law and political science. His parents commented that from his youth, he understood the problems of poverty that several people lived around him, he founded a popular restaurant when he was in high school, a restaurant that currently has his name. Being a high school student and in the midst of a protest, he met the legendary trade union leader Rubén Darío Castaño whom he considered his political mentor and shortly after, joined the ranks of the Colombian Communist Youth (JUCO) where he reached positions of leadership. Years later, Castaño would also be killed by paramilitaries in November 1985 at the door of his house.

In 1977, he married Ana Lucía Zapata Hincapié, a teacher born in Apía Risaralda with whom they had a daughter, Paula Tatiana (1978-2014), and a son, Bernardo Jaramillo Zapata.

== In the Patriotic Union ==
Jaramillo joined the Patriotic Union Party (UP) once it was founded in 1985, and later in the 1988 election won the seat of Senator of the Republic. Following the murder of Pardo Leal he took the chair as president of the party.

He tried to give greater breadth to the UP, accused by its critics of being a political arm of the FARC. Jaramillo Ossa made efforts to link the movement with the Socialist International, which earned him the nickname "perestroika". Jaramillo intended to separate the suspected relationship between his party and the FARC by approaching the Socialist International. Jaramillo then ran for the presidency of Colombia. He was planning an alliance with Carlos Pizarro Leongómez, demobilized leader of the 19th of April Movement (M-19) and also a candidate for the Presidency.

== Murder ==
Jaramillo had been very vocal in denouncing the systematic assassination of members of UP, attributing them to the rise of right-wing paramilitary forces in allegiance with drug trafficking cartels, and approved and even supported by the military and other political forces. He specifically blamed president Virgilio Barco Vargas of ignoring the evidence of the collaboration between drug cartels and Colombia's military to create and fund the paramilitary forces responsible for the assassinations. Two days before his assassination, Carlos Lemos Simmonds, who was the Minister of Government at the time, dismissed Jaramillo's accusations and in turn suggested that UP was the political branch of FARC. Jaramillo responded by saying that such an accusation was both unfair and baseless, and that it meant essentially a death sentence for him and UP members, which proved true just two days later.

Jaramillo was murdered while campaigning in Bogotá on March 22, 1990. He was in Bogotá's Puente Aéreo terminal of El Dorado airport with his wife Mariela Barragan and several bodyguards provided to him by DAS. Despite having received death threats, he refused to wear a protective vest. Once he was in the terminal, he was waiting for his flight to Santa Marta, where he would go on vacation after the exhausting presidential campaign. A young paramilitary hitman, named Andrés Arturo Gutiérrez Maya, waited for him while he and his wife were in front of a pharmacy, then pulled out a Mini Ingram 380 machine gun and fired on the candidate. A guard pushed the wife away to prevent her being shot as well, while other bodyguards chased after the murderer, whom they shot and captured. Jaramillo fell wounded in the arms of his wife and uttered three sentences: "Mi amor, no siento las piernas. Estos hijueputas me dieron, me voy a morir. Abrazame y protegeme. [My love, I can't feel my legs. These motherfuckers got me, I am going to die. Hug me and protect me.]" He was put in a car by his wife and few other bodyguards, where he lost consciousness, and then taken to the hospital of the National Police. He died before he reached the operating theatre, after a delay in the elevator at the clinic.

After his assassination more than 3,000 members in or related to his party were also killed.

== Investigations ==
Since his murderer, Gutiérrez Maya, was 16 at the time of the assassination, he didn't go to jail, but to a minors facility. He was killed about a year later, with his father, as he had been allowed to be out of the correction facility temporarily. Gutiérrez Maya was a friend and coworker of Gerardo Gutiérrez Uribe, killer of Carlos Pizarro. The crime was originally attributed to Pablo Escobar, but the drug lord denied his involvement and even argued he had asked against it. An anonymous call to a radio station in Medellin attributed the murder to the paramilitary organization of Fidel Castaño, who apparently had inherited the criminal structure of Gonzalo Rodriguez Gacha, who had been killed months before. No one has been officially condemned by the assassination, but current consensus supports the hypothesis that the paramilitary organization of the Castaño brothers was behind the crime, even acknowledged by Carlos Castaño. On February 11, 2010, Alberto Romero, an ex director of the DAS (Colombian Security Service), was charged as being linked to the murder, together with Carlos Castaño, the chief of the AUC (paramilitary forces).

== Popular culture ==
- Bernardo Jaramillo is portrayed by the Colombian actor Orlando Valenzuela in the Colombian TV series Pablo Escobar: El Patrón del Mal.
- In TV series Tres Caínes is portrayed by an anonymous actor.
