= Confederation of Workers of Colombia =

Trade union centre in Colombia

CTC
- Confederation of Workers of Colombia
- Confederación de Trabajadores de Colombia
- Founded: 1936
- Headquarters: Bogotá, Colombia
- Location: Colombia
- Affiliations: ITUC
- Website: ctc-colombia.com.co/portal/

The Confederation of Workers of Colombia (Spanish: Confederación de Trabajadores de Colombia, CTC) is a trade union centre in Colombia. It was formed in 1936, and is affiliated to the International Trade Union Confederation.

In 1976 José Raquel Mercado, a former president of CTC, was assassinated by the M-19 movement.
