= Clandestine Colombian Communist Party =

Colombian Clandestine Communist Party Partido Comunista Clandestino Colombiano
- Founder: Alfonso Cano
- Founded: 2000
- Dissolved: 2017
- Split from: PCC
- Succeeded by: FARC
- Headquarters: Bogotá
- Paramilitary wing: FARC–EP
- Ideology: Communism; Marxism–Leninism; Bolivarianism; Left-wing nationalism
- Political position: Left-wing to far-left

The Clandestine Colombian Communist Party (in Spanish: Partido Comunista Clandestino Colombiano) was an underground communist party in Colombia. It was politically linked to the Revolutionary Armed Forces of Colombia (FARC), which founded the party in 2000. After FARC officially broke with the Colombian Communist Party (CCP), a separate FARC-based party structure came into de facto existence during most of the 1990s, until the PCCC was officially founded in 2000. The party's founder and leader was FARC's commander Guillermo León Sáenz, also known as "Alfonso Cano", who was killed in action in 2011.

== History ==
As a result of peace negotiations between FARC and the Colombian government in 1985, FARC, in conjunction with the Colombian Communist Party, founded the Patriotic Union (UP) as a legal political party that would participate in electoral politics. Although the formation of the UP was a provision of the negotiations with the government, the party was violently repressed by right-wing paramilitary groups as well as Colombian drug lords. Whatever optimism FARC held regarding entrance into mainstream politics was slowly abandoned as the UP all but disintegrated in the late-1980s.

Because FARC maintained a rigid ideology, they informally maintained a party structure known as the Bolivarian Movement for a New Colombia in the 1990s. This new emphasis on the figure of Simon Bolivar would later be incorporated into the official ideology of the PCCC. After the end of the Cold War, FARC would not abandon their ideological devotion to Marxism–Leninism but they did complement it with nationalist Bolivarian sentiment. The transformation of this movement into the founding of the PCCC was officially announced by FARC in 2000.

With the creation of the Common Alternative Revolutionary Force after the Colombian peace process, the party was disbanded, with its members joining the newly established political party.

== Ideology ==
In adherence with Leninism, FARC did not intend for the PCCC to run in "bourgeois" elections. Instead, the PCCC was to remain underground, serving as the vanguard party for the FARC. As well as keeping the FARC rooted in Marxism–Leninism, the PCCC also sought to appeal to other members of the working class in hopes of building a revolutionary class consciousness in Colombia. The existence of an official ideological organ of FARC also helped the organization to legitimize itself as a viable alternative to bourgeois democracy.
