= Communist Party of Colombia (Marxist–Leninist) =

Communist Party of Colombia (Marxist–Leninist) Partido Comunista de Colombia (Marxista–Leninista)
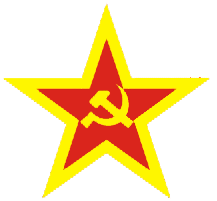
- Founded: 1965
- Split from: PCC
- Newspaper: Orientación Revolución
- Armed wing: EPL
- Ideology: Communism; Marxism–Leninism; Maoism (formerly); Hoxhaism; Anti-Revisionism
- Political position: Far-left
- International affiliation: ICMLPO

The Communist Party of Colombia (Marxist–Leninist) (Spanish: Partido Comunista de Colombia (Marxista–leninista), PCC(M–L)) was a Colombian anti-revisionist Marxist–Leninist communist party that splintered from the main Colombian Communist Party (PCC) around 1965.

The armed wing of the PCC(M–L) was the Popular Liberation Army (EPL), whose dissidents continue to be active separate from the party.

== Ideology ==
PCC(M–L) was originally of Maoist orientation, breaking off from the PCC in 1965 over disagreement on support for the Chinese Communist Party, recognized as its official sister party in Colombia. Later, after the Sino-Albanian split, it adopted a pro-Albanian stance, moving it towards Hoxhaism.

== Reorganization ==
In 1991, peace talks dubbed the Tlaxcala and Caracas dialogues led to a partial demobilization of EPL fighters and the reorganization of the CPC(M-L) into the political party - Hope, Peace, and Liberty (ESPALI), now Democratic Hope. Internationally, it is affiliated with the International Conference of Marxist–Leninist Parties and Organizations (Unity & Struggle).

== See also ==
- List of anti-revisionist groups
