= Patriotic Union (Colombia) =

Patriotic Union Unión Patriótica
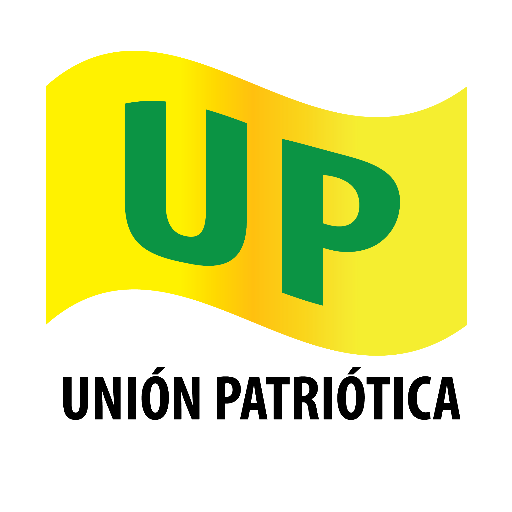
- President: Aída Avella
- Founded: 28 May 1985
- Registered: July 2013 (reinstated)
- Banned: September 2002
- Merger of: FARC; Colombian Communist Party
- Merged into: Historic Pact
- Headquarters: Bogotá
- Youth wing: Union of Patriotic Youth
- Ideology: Democratic socialism Progressivism; Anti-authoritarianism; Anti-neoliberalism; Anti-racism; Bolivarianism; Internationalism; Latin Americanism; Marxism
- Political position: Left-wing
- National affiliation: List of Decency (2017–2018); Historic Pact for Colombia (2021–2025)
- Regional affiliation: São Paulo Forum
- Colours: Yellow, Green

Party flag

Website
- partido-up.org

The Patriotic Union (Spanish: Unión Patriótica, UP) was a leftist Colombian political party founded by the FARC and the Colombian Communist Party in 1985 as part of the peace negotiations that the guerrillas held with the Conservative Belisario Betancur administration.

The party was subject to political violence from drug lords, paramilitaries and security forces agents during the mid-1980s, leading to its eventual decline, virtual disappearance, and extermination. The Colombian justice system counts 5,733 murdered militants of the Patriotic Union. The Inter-American Court of Human Rights counts more than 8,000 activists murdered and many more disappeared, tortured or displaced.

In September 2002, new electoral laws stripped the UP of formal and legal representative status as a political party, but the Council of State of Colombia gave this status back in July 2013, facilitating its members to again run for office.

== Origins ==
According to internal FARC documents from the group's 1982 Seventh Guerrilla Conference, the FARC originally intended for the creation of a group of clandestine party cells to be its political branch for recruitment and ideological propaganda purposes, while simultaneously maintaining its armed strength intact, at least initially, as part of the "combination of all forms of struggle". In theory, as the FARC developed a new form of army structure (the "People's Army", Ejército del Pueblo or EP), it would eventually be able to surround the cities with its armed columns, making the support of urban cells and mass movements decisive in order to finally seize power.

When the negotiations with the Betancur administration began after a 1982 amnesty, a cease-fire was declared in October 1984. The cease-fire was initially respected by both parties, but the FARC as a whole did not demobilize or directly renounce to the armed struggle. The UP was founded in May 1985 and several prominent FARC members were among the party's original founders, as well as members of the Colombian Communist Party (PCC). Almost a decade later, towards the early 1990s, the PCC ended its affiliation with the FARC, and the FARC's current political structure has become a separate body, known as the Clandestine Colombian Communist Party.

During the 1980s, the UP's ideology was openly communist and Marxist, but the main platform initially consisted of promoting itself as a legal and democratic alternative to the two main Colombian political parties, the Conservatives and the Liberals. UP campaigners usually focused on proposing and implementing solutions to the problems of poor communities, rather than relying solely on a strictly rigorous ideological work (though this was also done where applicable).

With the official resignation of Jacobo Arenas, in November 1985, the UP internally elected Jaime Pardo as its presidential candidate.

In August 1986, the National Electoral Council recognized the UP as a political movement.

== History ==
The peace negotiations with the government gave both the FARC and the new UP a high media profile that the guerrillas and their ideas had never experienced before, appearing in radio, television and newspaper chronicles regularly. As the UP campaigned, gradually, many independents, leftwingers and other social and political sectors joined the party, eventually changing its focus from what was perceived as a FARC vehicle to a more independent-minded political actor, not directly responsible to the guerrilla's Secretariat and in fact in outright conflict with it on some points.

Different opinions existed inside the UP throughout its existence. In general, members of more orthodox sectors within the UP tended to be more openly supportive of the FARC's activities both morally and potentially materially as well, while more unorthodox sectors, though often also justifying the existence of the guerrillas as a consequence of social inequalities, tried to establish a clearer line of distinction between the FARC and the UP.

The UP had some mixed electoral success. In the 1986 general elections (during which the indirect election of mayors, governors and other posts was still valid), it expected to gain 5% of the vote, but received 1.4%. This was enough for it to gain 5 seats in the Senate and 9 in the Chamber of Representatives at the national level, and 14 deputies, 351 councilmen and 23 municipal mayors at the local level. Results which, despite their limitations, were at that moment unprecedented for a non-mainstream third party since the height of the National Popular Alliance in the 1970s.

Jaime Pardo, as the UP's candidate, came third in the May 1986 presidential race, with some 350,000 votes, 4.5% of the total.

In the March 1988 elections (when the direct popular election of mayors, governors and others was formally introduced and implemented), the UP once again did not meet its original expectations, but was still considered by some observers to be the fourth most voted political party in Colombia, gaining 14 out of 1,008 mayoralties. Observers noted that the election gave the UP legal jurisdiction over the police and military forces in local districts with strong FARC activity.

== Decline and extermination ==
By 1987, the party's leadership began to be gradually but increasingly decimated by the violent attacks and assassinations carried out by drug lords, proto-paramilitary groups and some members of the government's armed forces that acted together with the above, with what many observers consider as the passive tolerance (and in, some instances, the alleged collaboration) of the traditional bipartisan political establishment.

Jaime Pardo himself was assassinated by a 14-year-old on 11 October 1987, who was later killed as well. Drug lord José Gonzalo Rodríguez, also known as "the Mexican", was apparently involved in the murder as a sponsor. The Communist Party's newspaper published a report in which it allegedly linked members of the Colombian military to José Gonzalo Rodríguez.

Also during 1987, the ceasefire between the FARC and the Colombian government gradually collapsed due to regional guerrilla and Army skirmishes that created a situation where each violation of the ceasefire rendered it null in each location, until it was rendered practically nonexistent.

In 1988, the UP announced that more than 500 of its members, including Jaime Pardo and 4 congressmen, had been assassinated to date. Unidentified gunmen later attacked more than 100 of the UP's local candidates in the six months preceding the March 1988 elections. An April 1988 report by Amnesty International charged that members of the Colombian military and government would be involved in what was called a "deliberate policy of political murder" of UP militants and others. The Liberal government of Virgilio Barco strongly denied this charge.

During this period, the mid-1980s to the early-1990s, deadly violence was also directed against mainstream politicians, such as the official Liberal presidential candidate Luis Carlos Galán on 18 August 1989, M-19 presidential candidate Carlos Pizarro on 26 April 1990, Justice Minister Rodrigo Lara on 30 April 1984, and others. Liberal Ernesto Samper was wounded while he was saying hello to Jose Antequera, Union Patriotica leader who was murdered on 3 March 1989, Ernesto Samper survived the attack, Jose Antequera died. Numerous car bombs and explosives were also regularly activated in several important Colombian cities, including the capital Bogotá, leaving hundreds dead and wounded.

While some investigations were opened and some of the gunmen and military men involved were captured and convicted, most of the murders committed during these years were never resolved and most of those intellectually responsible were never punished, indicating a high degree of judicial impunity that continues to plague modern Colombia.

It has been claimed by some of the individuals responsible, such as the AUC's Carlos Castaño (who published a book in which he admitted his participation in many of these events and has apparently regretted a number of his actions), that they believed that the UP was nothing more than a FARC front, in order to attempt to rationalize the violence. According to many observers, such a situation had not been strictly true for long, and the FARC itself later began to further distance itself from the group amid the bloodshed. Some also consider that the FARC's political wing suffered both a physical and mental blow during this period.

The exact number of the victims is not clear. It is usually an accepted figure to state that allegedly some 2,000 to 3,000 of its members were murdered (the highest unofficial and unconfirmed estimates, irregularly employed by the FARC and a small number of analysts, speak of 5,000 or more).

Two presidential candidates were murdered, plus eight congressmen, 70 councilmen, dozens of deputies and mayors, hundreds of trade unionists, communist and peasant leaders, and an unestablished number of militants.

The official legal representatives of a partial number of UP victims presented a concrete death toll of about 1,163 to the Inter-American Commission on Human Rights (IACHR), of which 450 (38%) were attributed directly to paramilitary groups. The breakdown of the remainder was not publicly specified.

The UP's party leader and presidential candidate for the 1990 elections, Bernardo Jaramillo Ossa, was murdered on 22 March 1990.

In the 1991 legislative elections, the UP elected 3 congressmen and only elected one senator, Manuel Cepeda in the 1994 elections. By then, the UP itself and many of its then leaders (such as presidential candidate Jaramillo, and senator Cepeda, murdered later in 1994), in spite of the wave of violence unleashed against them, rejected the violence and continued to insist for a negotiated settlement in order to end Colombia's conflict.

Bernardo Jaramillo, a lifelong member of the Communist Party, witnessed the deaths of his comrades and had openly criticized the positions of both the FARC and the Colombian government because of what he considered as their mutual intolerance and lack of willingness to compromise for peace. He had promoted the entrance of the UP into the Socialist International, a move which was apparently unwelcome by the FARC and the Colombian Communist Party at the time. He believed that with the end of the Cold War, social democracy was the only effective way to resolve Colombia's problems, and not armed revolution.

On 11 February 2010, Alberto Romero, an ex director of the DAS (Colombian Security Service) was charged as being linked to the murder, together with Carlos Castaño.

Behind these massacres is an alliance between traditional right-wing politicians, police and military, businessmen and paramilitaries. These crimes have been covered up by a judiciary that has been reluctant to prosecute the perpetrators and their sponsors.

== Legacy ==
The FARC-EP and its sympathizers have later repeatedly employed the destruction of the UP as a strong argument in order to justify its armed struggle against the Colombian state and its assuming positions that many on the Colombian and international left-wing consider to be radical. FARC officially considers that the UP's extermination was a clear sign of government intolerance, state terrorism and of the impossibility of legal political action in Colombia.

Several of the FARC's critics believe that, despite the unjustifiable bloodshed, it is debatable whether such positions are entirely a consequence of the UP's failure. Some believe that, at least partially, their basis was part of the FARC's preexisting ideological and political strategies. In addition, members of the legal left-wing parties in modern Colombia, such as the Independent Democratic Pole, while they are still subject to targeted threats and assassinations for which they blame paramilitaries supported by individual members of the state's armed forces, have stated that the legal political struggle that the UP fought and ultimately died for should not be given up in favor of the use of arms, which only extends the cycle of violence.

Most members of the Colombian left and the surviving victims, however, tend to agree that the Colombian state should provide an adequate resolution to the crimes, by giving reparations to the victims, implementing a degree of judicial punishment to those responsible, and most importantly, securing a public revelation of the full truth about the matter.

If it does not do so, as it has not yet been the case, then international tribunals or organizations, such as the IACHR, should assign it the proper responsibility. For these reasons, many are skeptical and highly critical of the demobilization negotiations that Álvaro Uribe's administration is holding with the AUC, because they fear that they might result in undue impunity.

The UP, among other minor parties that had been losing votes in recent years, formally lost its legal representative status as a political party (personería jurídica) in September 2002 after that year's national elections, due to the application of new electoral laws that conditioned such a status (or the regaining of the same) to either the signing of a petition with 50,000 signatures or to obtaining a certain minimum percentage of votes. Some UP members continue to identify themselves as such within the Social and Political Front.

== Possible legal action and reparations ==
On 4 February 2004, vice president Francisco Santos Calderón announced that the Colombian state had reached an official agreement with the Reiniciar NGO, which represents a number of victims belonging to the UP and the Communist Party who had presented their cases before the IACHR earlier. In addition to an estimated 1,163 homicide victims, 120 forced disappearances, 43 attack survivors, and more than 250 victims of threats were represented by the NGO.

The agreement would mean that the Colombian state has accepted that it is legally obliged to begin to seek a final compromise with the victims, which should provide an investigation of the crimes and judicial sanction for those responsible, in addition to a degree of moral and economic reparation. Critical observers have mentioned that the government's negotiations with the paramilitaries could run contrary to this compromise, if not properly handled.

The incident was sponsored by the OAS, as a result of which the state is theoretically forced to comply with it as much as with any international treaty, as an alternative to any eventual direct IACHR decision. The announcement apparently did not receive much press coverage at the time and further developments, if any, have not been made public yet. Vice president Santos stated that he hopes that a solution is reached before the government's term ends in 2006.
