= Colombian Communist Party =

Political party in Colombia

Colombian Communist Party Partido Comunista Colombiano
- Leader: Jaime Caycedo
- Founded: 1930
- Dissolved: 2025
- Preceded by: Revolutionary Socialist Party
- Merged into: Historic Pact
- Headquarters: Bogotá
- Newspaper: Voz
- Youth wing: Colombian Communist Youth (JUCO)
- Paramilitary wing: FARC–EP (1964-1993)
- Ideology: Communism; Marxism–Leninism; Bolivarianism
- Political position: Far-left
- National affiliation: Patriotic Union (from 1985); Historic Pact for Colombia (from 2021) Historical: Alternative Democratic Pole (2006–2012) Democratic Alternative (2005–2006) Social and Political Front (1999–2005) Frente Democrático (1982–1985) National Union of Opposition (1972–1982) United Front (1965) Frente Popular Antifascista (1934–1938)
- Regional affiliation: São Paulo Forum
- International affiliation: IMCWP; World Anti-Imperialist Platform

Website
- www.pacocol.org

The Colombian Communist Party (Spanish: Partido Comunista Colombiano, PC or PCC) was a far-left political party in Colombia that existed from 1930 to 2025. It was founded in 1930 as the successor to the Revolutionary Socialist Party and a member of the Communist International; it merged with the Patriotic Union, Alternative Democratic Pole, and Humane Colombia in 2025 to form the Historic Pact.

The Revolutionary Armed Forces of Colombia (FARC) was founded as the armed wing of the PCC in 1964, but the two organisations separated in 1993.

== History ==
The Communist Party of Colombia was established on 17 July 1930 by the Central Committee of its predecessor, the Revolutionary Socialist Party. It was founded as a member of the Communist International which began a bolshevikzation of what was left of its predecessor, from which María Cano and Tomás Uribe Márquez would emerge as party leaders. The party pushed for improved conditions for Colombian laborers and an expansion of rights for the lower classes in Colombian society. Through the PCC, groups of laborers organized to combat the regulations and actions of the government and empowered corporations. These groups, known as "peasant leagues", established an interconnected network that coordinated protests and labor strikes, countered state-sanctioned violence, and sought to protect local populations. The state opposed the actions of these groups through military violence in attempt to repress the influence of the PCC. The PCC continued growing in membership and support, even as the Colombian Conservative Party returned to power in 1946 with Conservative Mariano Ospina Perez winning the presidency. In the mid-1960s the U.S. State Department estimated the party membership to be approximately 13,000, with further support from over 25,000 Colombian citizens.

During the events of "La Violencia" and after the development of "La Frente Nacional" (The National Front), the Colombian government continued its repression of communist groups and takeover of land. The PCC became involved with guerrilla groups and local communist militias who continued rebelling against the national government. While many such guerrilla groups disbanded and demobilized during the ceasefire proclaimed by General Gustavo Rojas Pinilla in the early 1950s, various entities continued their mobilization efforts. PCC leadership, joined by guerilla leaders, established las "Fuerzas Armadas Revolucionarias de Colombia—Ejército del Pueblo" or Revolutionary Armed Forces of Colombia (FARC). The PCC would be involved with FARC until 1993.

Three members of the PCC were known to have undergone training with the East German Ministry of State Security (MfS); such courses, provided by the "Task Force of the Minister, Responsibility Special Issues" ("Arbeitsgruppe des Ministers, Aufgabenbereich Sonderfragen"- AGM/S) and additionally accompanied by KGB officers, encompassed a wide range of paramilitary infiltration and sabotage techniques, but no additional details are known.

The PCC was a founding member of the Social and Political Front (FSP) party coalition, which later merged into the Alternative Democratic Pole (PDA) alliance. The PCC was expelled from the PDA in August 2012 because of its affiliation to Patriotic March, another political alliance.

PCC member Gloria Inés Ramírez was Minister of Labor of Colombia from 11 August 2022 to 9 February 2025 under president Gustavo Petro. This marked the first time that a member of the PCC had obtained a ministerial position in the Colombian government.

In 2025, the party sought to merge with the Patriotic Union (UP), Alternative Democratic Pole (PDA), and Humane Colombia. After the National Electoral Council initially allowed only the merger of the PCC, UP, and PDA, the Council of State approved the full merge on May 21^{st}, 2026, finalizing the creation of the Historic Pact.

== Relationship with the FARC ==
=== Early years ===
During and following the La Violencia civil war that erupted in Colombia from the late 1940s to the mid-1950s, the communists developed organic links to several liberal guerrilla and irregular rural forces, most of whom nominally depended on the official Colombian Liberal Party and eventually demobilized by the end of that period. Those groups with more direct relations with the PCC tended to not demobilize, keeping their weapons and organizational structures mostly intact. In 1947, a short-lived Communist Labour Party was formed by former members of the PCC.

Later, in 1964, a section of these guerrillas would develop into the Revolutionary Armed Forces of Colombia (FARC-EP), which initially was considered as the official armed wing of the Communist party. The PCC leadership mostly operated in the cities during the 1960s and 1970s, but it supported the operations of the FARC, regularly holding solidarity and donation rallies for FARC members and units, as well as occasionally providing other forms of aid (supplies, equipment, intelligence, political cadres or ideological literature).

The PCC justified the operations of the guerrillas as the armed component of the fight against capitalism and imperialism in Colombia, while at the same time it continued to participate in legal electoral activities independently. Both activities were considered to have their own place within the so-called "combination of all forms of struggle", a concept often employed by PCC and FARC.

=== Moving apart ===
Gradually the PCC and FARC-EP grew apart politically, in particular during the later 1980s. Both organizations had their share of internal debates, for example as to which entity would have greater influence and control over the Unión Patriótica (in the end the PCC accepted FARC supremacy in this regard) during its formation, and later on the issue of continuing to participate in elections as the UP suffered violent suppression (the FARC began to separate itself from legal UP activities starting in 1987).

Other disagreements would include that the PCC may have allegedly tended to follow the changes that developed within the official Soviet line during the Cold War, which the FARC-EP did not consider as strictly binding. After the Berlin Wall fell, confusion among the two sides increased. The principle of the "combination of all forms of struggle" was also brought into question at the time by some members of the PCC and UP leadership. The PCC officially broke with the FARC in 1993.

As a result, a separate Clandestine Colombian Communist Party was officially formed in 2000, though some sort of separate FARC-based internal party structure had been in de facto existence during most of the 1990s. Both organizations have remained completely distinct in their activities, though individual members of both parties may have continued to maintain working relationships on occasion.

== Persecution ==
During most of its history, the PCC had been the subject of repression and persecution both by private individuals, active and retired government agents and others. The PCC was severely weakened by paramilitary massacres and assassinations from the early 1980s to the mid-1990s.

One of many examples of communist persecution in Colombia was the total prohibition of presumed «communist activities» in the year 1954, which directly affected the Communist Party of Colombia's activities, under the dictatorship of Gustavo Rojas Pinilla. It was ordered under two gubernatorial acts, the Legislative Act n°6 of 1954, which prohibited any «political activity related to international communism» and the Decree n° 434 of 1956, where it declared sentences between 1 to 5 years in prison for actions such as showing any direct support over communist politics, the redaction and/or publication of communist propaganda, between other 5 specific points.

A leading PCC figure, Arturo Díaz García, was assassinated on December 21^{st}, 2005, at the age of 44, in the corregimiento of Toche in the municipality of Ibagué, Tolima. His widow, Gladys Camacho, had stated that he already had been threatened by local paramilitary militia, along with other farmers in the zone a couple months before the tragedy. Supporters of David Ravelo, a member of the PCC's central committee who is serving an 18-year sentence for plotting to murder a municipal official, contend that he is a political prisoner who was prosecuted illegitimately.

Nearly 7,000 communist militants have been killed since the 1980s.
