= 1991 Colombian parliamentary election =

Parliamentary elections were held in Colombia on 27 October 1991 to elect the Senate and Chamber of Representatives. The result was a victory for the Liberal Party, which won 87 of the 161 seats in the Chamber and 56 of the 102 seats in the Senate.

== Background ==
Following a spate of political violence, an unofficial referendum on forming a Constitutional Assembly was held alongside the March 1990 parliamentary elections. An official referendum was later held in May, which saw 96% of voters vote in favour of convening an Assembly.

Elections for the Assembly were held in December 1990, and a new constitution was promulgated in July 1991.

The Constitutional Assembly passed the Acto Constituyente de Vigencia Immediata on 18 June 1991, which called for fresh Congressional elections in October, with the newly elected Congress replacing the one elected under the previous constitution in 1990.

== Campaign ==
A total of 486 lists were registered for the election, of which 237 were affiliated with the Liberal Party and 64 with the Conservative Party.

== Results ==
=== Senate ===
Party	Votes	%	Seats	+/–
Colombian Liberal Party	2,263,398	42.52	56	–10
19th of April Movement	454,467	8.54	9	New
New Democratic Force	436,562	8.20	8	New
Colombian Conservative Party	346,749	6.51	9	–29
National Salvation Movement	234,358	4.40	5	New
Patriotic Union	79,753	1.50	1	New
Christian Union Movement	67,885	1.28	1	New
Conservative National Movement	58,012	1.09	1	0
Progressive Force	49,902	0.94	1	New
Laicists for Colombia	49,789	0.94	1	New
Progressive National Movement	44,693	0.84	1	New
Independent Conservatism	43,172	0.81	1	New
Independent Liberal Restoration Movement	40,990	0.77	1	New
Conservative Reintegration Movement	37,027	0.70	1	New
Metapolitical Unitary Movement	31,080	0.58	1	+1
Indigenous Authorities of Colombia	30,312	0.57	1	New
National Indigenous Organization of Colombia	30,020	0.56	1	New
Christian National Party	27,276	0.51	1	New
United Movement for Colombia	27,267	0.51	1	New
Independent Social Alliance Movement	26,493	0.50	1	New
Others	482,497	9.06	0	–
Blank votes	461,184	8.66	–	–
Total	5,322,886	100.00	102	–12
Valid votes	5,322,886	97.02		
Invalid votes	163,550	2.98		
Total votes	5,486,436	100.00		
Registered voters/turnout	15,037,526	36.48		
Source: Nohlen

=== Chamber of Representatives ===
Party	Votes	%	Seats	+/–
Colombian Liberal Party	2,425,304	46.22	87	–32
Colombian Conservative Party	792,153	15.10	27	–35
19th of April Movement	483,382	9.21	13	New
National Salvation Movement	327,845	6.25	11	New
Conservative National Movement	107,951	2.06	4	+1
Patriotic Union	94,393	1.80	3	+2
Christian Union Movement	75,977	1.45	1	New
Independent Liberal Restoration Movement	43,338	0.83	1	New
United Movement for Colombia	41,011	0.78	1	New
People's Front	40,969	0.78	1	New
New Colombia Movement	28,354	0.54	1	New
Metapolitical Unitary Movement	23,882	0.46	1	New
Christian National Party	22,808	0.43	0	New
Indigenous Authorities of Colombia	21,103	0.40	1	New
Civic Movement for Caldas	16,177	0.31	0	New
Independent Civic Movement	15,748	0.30	1	New
North Valle del Cauca Unity	15,586	0.30	1	New
Democratic Renovation Movement	14,320	0.27	1	New
Galanista Democratic Union	13,936	0.27	0	New
Quindianos por Colombia	10,679	0.20	0	New
People's Integration Movement	10,199	0.19	0	New
Quintín Lame	8,412	0.16	0	New
Christian Democratic Party	7,908	0.15	0	New
Regional Integration Movement	5,722	0.11	1	New
Socialist Workers' Party	5,487	0.10	0	New
Unique Movement of Conservative Renovation	29,519	0.56	1	New
Conservador Humbertista	29,519	0.56	1	New
Movimiento Humbertista	29,519	0.56	1	New
Transformation	29,519	0.56	1	New
Others	29,519	0.56	8	–
Coalitions	21,742	0.41	1	–9
Blank votes	543,662	10.36	–	–
Total	5,247,567	100.00	169	–38
Valid votes	5,247,567	97.16		
Invalid votes	153,130	2.84		
Total votes	5,400,697	100.00		
Registered voters/turnout	15,037,526	35.91		
Source: Nohlen
