= May 1990 Colombian Constitutional Assembly referendum =

27 May 1990
- To strengthen participatory democracy, do you vote for the convocation of a Constitutional Assembly with representation of the social, political and regional forces of the nation, democratically and popularly integrated to reform the Political Constitution of Colombia?

Results
Choice	Votes	%
Yes	5,236,863	95.79%
No	230,080	4.21%
Valid votes	5,466,943	92.80%
Invalid or blank votes	424,174	7.20%
Total votes	5,891,117	100.00%
Registered voters/turnout	13,903,324	42.37%

A referendum on electing a Constitutional Assembly was held in Colombia on 27 May 1990 alongside presidential elections. The proposal was approved by 96% of voters. A Constitutional Assembly was later elected in December 1990 and produced the 1991 constitution.

== Background ==
After the murder of presidential candidate Luis Carlos Galán in August 1989, students started a movement calling for a referendum "for peace and democracy" to be held on 21 January 1990. However, under pressure from drug cartels, the government rejected the proposal. The students then set up the "We can still save Colombia" movement, which called for a referendum alongside the general elections on 11 March 1990 on establishing a Constitutional Assembly. The referendum saw 2,235,493 vote in favour and 117,000 vote against.

Following the unofficial referendum, President Virgilio Barco Vargas issued decree 927 on 3 May calling a referendum on electing a Constitutional Assembly alongside the presidential elections on 27 May. Although this was in violation of article 114 of the constitution, which gave Congress sole rights to reform the constitution, the referendum was approved by the Supreme Court.

== Results ==
Choice	Votes	%
For	5,236,863	95.79
Against	230,080	4.21
Total	5,466,943	100.00
Valid votes	5,466,943	92.80
Invalid/blank votes	424,174	7.20
Total votes	5,891,117	100.00
Registered voters/turnout	13,903,324	42.37
Source: Direct Democracy
