= Enrique Gómez Martínez =

Colombian politician (born 1968)

Senator-elect of Colombia
- Incumbent
- Assumed office TBD

President of National Salvation Movement
- Incumbent
- Assumed office 1 December 2021
- Preceded by: Party restablished

Personal details
- Born: 23 December 1968 (age 57) Bogotá, Colombia
- Party: National Salvation Movement
- Children: Nicolás Gómez Arenas
- Relatives: Miguel Gómez Martínez (brother); Álvaro Gómez Hurtado (uncle); Laureano Gómez (paternal grandfather); María Hurtado de Gómez (paternal grandmother)
- Education: Sergio Arboleda University
- Occupation: Lawyer • Professor • Politician

Enrique Gómez Martínez (born 23 December 1968) is the leader of the National Salvation Movement. He was elected member of the Senate of Colombia in 2026.

The National Salvation Movement is the party for which he was a candidate in the 2022 presidential elections. The party was founded by his uncle Álvaro Gómez Hurtado in 1990, with him running under the party as presidential candidate that year.
