= 1990 Colombian presidential election =

Presidential election held in Colombia

- 27 May 1990
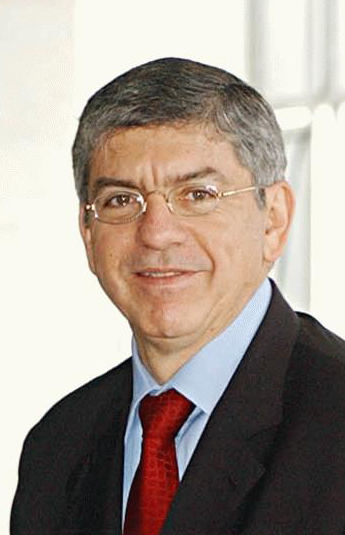

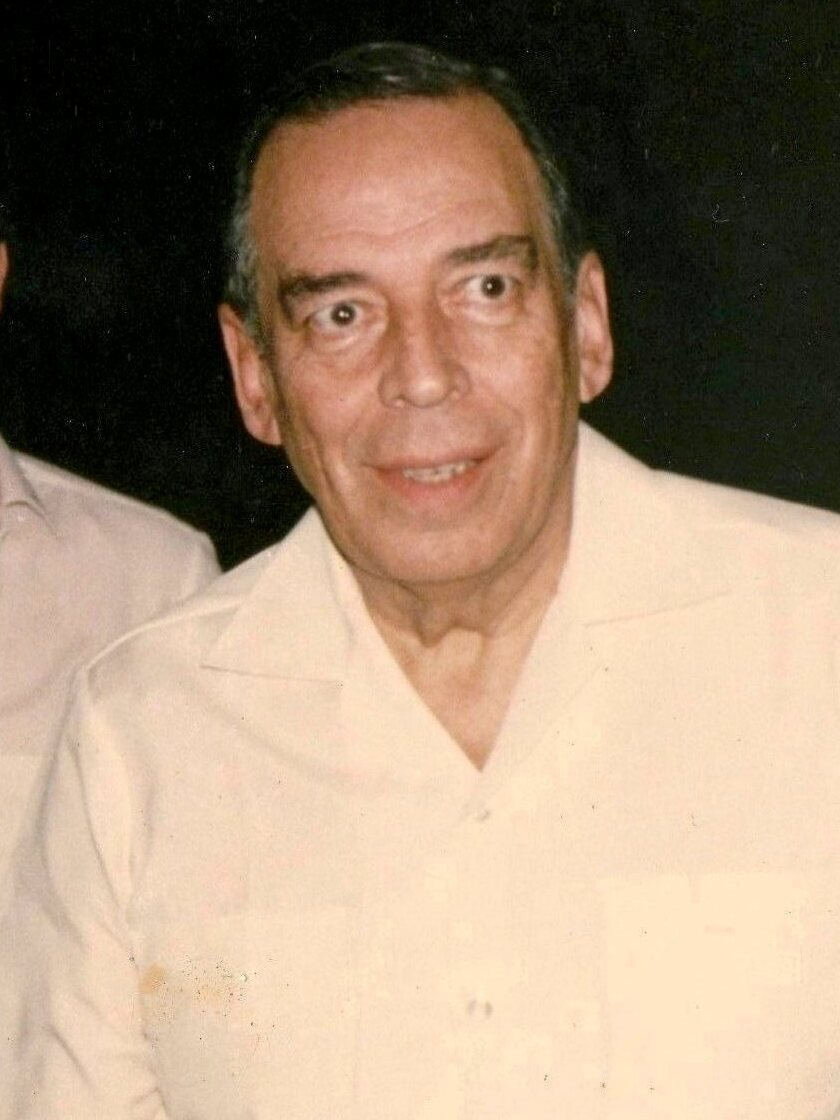

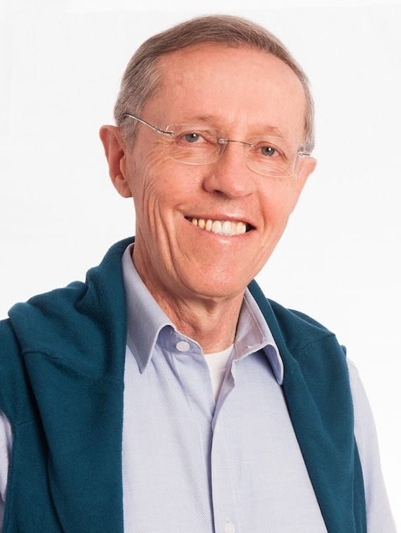

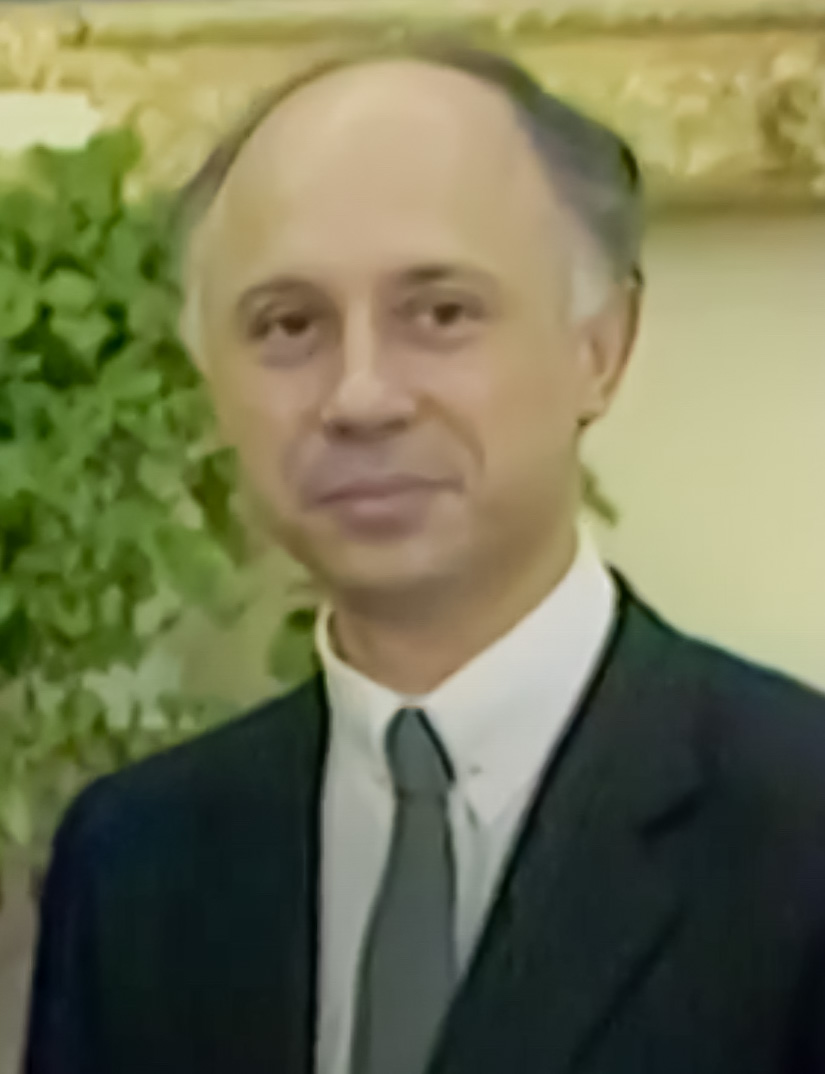
Nominee	César Gaviria	Álvaro Gómez Hurtado
Party	Liberal	National Salvation
Popular vote	2,891,808	1,433,913
Percentage	48.18%	23.89%
Nominee	Antonio Navarro Wolff	Rodrigo Lloreda Caicedo
Party	M-19	Conservative
Popular vote	754,740	735,374
Percentage	12.57%	12.25%
- Results by department
President before election
Virgilio Barco Vargas
Liberal
Elected President
César Gaviria
Liberal

Presidential elections were held in Colombia on 27 May 1990. In an election tarnished by violence, the result was a victory for César Gaviria of the Liberal Party, who received 48.2% of the vote.

== Background ==
The elections took place in the context of a long history of the tumultuous political environment of Colombia. After gaining independence in 1810, Colombian politics were dominated for thirty years by the conservatives, centrists, and federationists. Conservatives wished to maintain the role of the Catholic Church in society, centrists desired a centralized and powerful government with the authority to appoint leaders across the nation, and federationists wanted a nation composed of autonomous states joined by a central and limited government. Eventually the Social Conservative Party (PSC) and Liberal Party (PL) gained prominence, respectively associated with the Catholic clergy and with the merchants/artisans. After years of political violence and instability between the parties, they formed the National Front, which alternated office between the two every four years. This excluded leftist political organizations, prompting the formation of guerrilla groups like FARC, ELN, and the EPL in the 1960s followed by the April 19 Movement (M-19) in the 1970s. Eventually, the elections opened up to competition, leading to 12 main parties competing for office in the 1990 election. This even included the then demilitarized M-19 candidate Antonio Navarro Wolff.

=== Assassinations ===
On 11 October 1987 potential candidate Jaime Pardo Leal was assassinated. On 3 March 1989 an attack at El Dorado airport led to the death of Patriotic Union leader José Antequera and injured future president Ernesto Samper. On 18 August the same year, Luis Carlos Galán, the Liberal Party's nominated presidential candidate and favourite for the election, was shot on stage during a rally. César Gaviria then became the party's main candidate; on 27 November Avianca Flight 203 carrying 107 people on board was bombed in an attempt to kill him. Gaviria did not board the flight and was safe, but everyone on board died, as well as three people on the ground who were hit by falling debris.

On 22 March 1990 Bernardo Jaramillo Ossa, the candidate of the Patriotic Union, was assassinated, resulting in the party pulling out of the elections. Another assassination occurred on 26 April, when the AD/M-19's candidate Carlos Pizarro Leongómez was killed.

== Electoral system ==
The 1990 presidential election were the last to use first-past-the-post voting before the 1991 Constitution implemented a two-round system.

== Candidates ==
Gaviria won the nomination for the Liberal Party candidacy in primary elections carried out on the same day as the March 1990 parliamentary elections. Pizarro was replaced as the AD/M19 candidate by Antonio Navarro Wolff.

== Campaign ==
On 11 March 1990, the day of the primary elections, M-19 announced their disarmament and quickly emptied their weapons, burned their uniforms, and turned in their rifles and machine guns to be melted down before abandoning their hideouts. They also signed a peace treaty with the current president, Virgilio Barco Vargas. They later inserted themselves into the election as a political party.

After taking over Galán’s campaign, Gaviria secured a prominent 59.9% majority in the primary election, making him the Liberal party’s clear choice. The failed assassination of him bolstered his support, as he took a hard anti-trafficker political stance and supported extradition of traffickers to prison in the United States. This was a blow to the drug lords, who had done their best to stop any pro-extradition candidate from getting into office. He set out for a presidency targeting a war against the drug lords plaguing Colombia. Out of all major campaigns, Gaviria made it most clear that he would make no accommodations for those involved in the industry. However, Gaviria's anti-drug policies led to numerous death and terror threats. Following Galán's death, Gaviria became significantly less accessible. He hardly made public appearances and instead restricted his campaign almost entirely to television. He kept his apartment with barrels blocking the street, armed soldiers, sniffer dogs, and policemen checking all visitors with metal detectors. The political and social atmospheres were made tense with the threats of violence maintaining a strong hold over the perception of the election. But despite the tension, most were pleased with his nomination.

== Opinion polls ==
The majority of prior polling predicted that Gaviria would win the presidential election after exit polls, following his strong win as the ruling Liberal Party’s candidate, showed Gaviria with a large lead over his opposition Hernando Duran Dussan and Ernesto Samper.

== Results ==
Candidate	Party	Votes	%
César Gaviria	Colombian Liberal Party	2,891,808	48.18
Álvaro Gómez Hurtado	National Salvation Movement	1,433,913	23.89
Antonio Navarro Wolff	Democratic Alliance M-19	754,740	12.57
Rodrigo Hernán Lloreda Caicedo	Social Conservative Party	735,374	12.25
Regina Betancur de Liska	Metapolitical Unitary Movement	37,537	0.63
Claudia Rodríguez de Castellanos	Christian National Party	33,645	0.56
Oscar Loaiza	Natural Party	9,468	0.16
José Agustín Linares	Christian Democratic Party	9,048	0.15
Luis Carlos Valencia	Socialist Workers' Party	8,168	0.14
Guillermo Alemán	Ecological Orientation Movement	7,429	0.12
Jesús García	Love for Colombia	2,411	0.04
Jairo Rodríguez	88 Meeting Movement	996	0.02
Blank votes		77,727	1.29
Total		6,002,264	100.00
Valid votes		6,002,264	99.25
Invalid votes		45,302	0.75
Total votes		6,047,566	100.00
Registered voters/turnout		13,903,324	43.50
Source: Nohlen

== Aftermath ==
The election itself went smoothly, with no actual violence on election day. M-19 received 13% of the vote on its first time on the ballot. After the elections, Gaviria promised to uphold a campaign pledge to give M-19 a cabinet post.

Prior to the elections, Colombian citizens had been fighting for constitutional reform for many years. The elections led to the creation of a new constitution. In March 1990 university students had called for voters to place an additional ballot in the March 1990 congressional elections if they wished for a new constitution. Over a million of additional ballots were deposited. The 1990 presidential elections were also the first in which voters chose their presidential candidate from a "tarjeton", a card that had both the names and pictures printed of all presidential candidates available in the voting booth. This was a switch from prior elections where voters would walk into the voting booth with their candidate's ballot in hand, a practice long known to contribute to widespread vote-buying by local party bosses.

Following the presidential elections, a National Constituent Assembly was elected in December 1990 and given the mandate of reforming the constitution. On 8 June 1991 Gaviria and the Constitutional Assembly dissolved the Congress elected in March 1990, with a new Congress elected on 27 October 1991. On 4 July 1991 a new constitution was ratified by the Constituent Assembly and combined almost two decades of political reform efforts by both presidents, parties, and citizens. Notable changes included modifying it so that a party only needed to win one seat in either the house of Congress or have one of its candidates win at least 50,000 votes to gain legal recognition, designating that the Senate would be elected nationally instead of on the departmental level, and incorporating unseen guarantees of indigenous rights that encompassed two reserved seats in the Senate as well as representation in Congress.
