= 1990 Colombian Constitutional Assembly election =

Constitutional Assembly elections were held in Colombia on 9 December 1990 alongside a referendum on the Assembly itself. The Assembly sat from February to July 1991 and drew up the 1991 constitution.

== Background ==
After the murder of presidential candidate Luis Carlos Galán in August 1989, students started a movement calling for a referendum "for peace and democracy" to be held on 21 January 1990. However, under pressure from drug cartels, the government rejected the proposal. The students then set up the "We can still save Colombia" movement, which called for a referendum alongside the general elections on 11 March 1990 on establishing a Constitutional Assembly. The referendum saw 2,235,493 voted in favour and 117,000 vote against.

Following the unofficial referendum, President Virgilio Barco Vargas issued decree 927 on 3 May calling a referendum on electing a Constitutional Assembly alongside the presidential elections on 27 May. Although this was in violation of article 218 of the constitution, which gave Congress sole rights to reform the constitution, the referendum was approved by the Supreme Court.

After 95% of voters approved of the election of the Assembly, elections were set for December. However, new President César Gaviria chose to reinforce the legitimacy of the Assembly by holding a second referendum on its election. Only those who voted "yes" in the referendum could then cast a vote for the Assembly.

The Assembly was elected by proportional representation in a single nationwide constituency.

== Results ==
=== Constitutional Assembly ===
Party	Votes	%	Seats
Colombian Liberal Party	1,070,193	29.03	24
19th of April Movement	992,613	26.93	19
National Salvation Movement	574,411	15.58	11
Colombian Conservative Party	423,775	11.50	9
Christian Evangelical Movement (MUC–PNC)	115,201	3.13	2
Patriotic Union	95,088	2.58	2
United Student Movement	64,711	1.76	1
National Indigenous Organization of Colombia	31,783	0.86	1
Movement for a New Country for the Children	24,625	0.67	1
Indigenous Authorities of Colombia	22,443	0.61	1
Metapolitical Unitary Movement	20,225	0.55	0
Socialist Workers' Party	5,153	0.14	0
Independents	208,134	5.65	0
Blank votes	37,735	1.02	–
Reserved seats for guerrilla groups			4
Total	3,686,090	100.00	75
Valid votes	3,686,090	99.34	
Invalid votes	24,467	0.66	
Total votes	3,710,557	100.00	
Registered voters/turnout	14,237,110	26.06	
Source: Nohlen, La Silla Vacía

Following the elections, four seats were given to guerrilla groups; two to the Popular Liberation Army, one to the Movimiento Armado Quintin Lame and one to the Workers Revolutionary Party.

=== Referendum ===
Choice	Votes	%
For	2,988,963	97.58
Against	74,055	2.42
Total	3,063,018	100.00
Valid votes	3,063,018	82.55
Invalid/blank votes	647,539	17.45
Total votes	3,710,557	100.00
Registered voters/turnout	14,237,110	26.06
Source: Direct Democracy
