= Antonio Navarro Wolff =

Colombian engineer, guerrilla and politician (1948–2026)

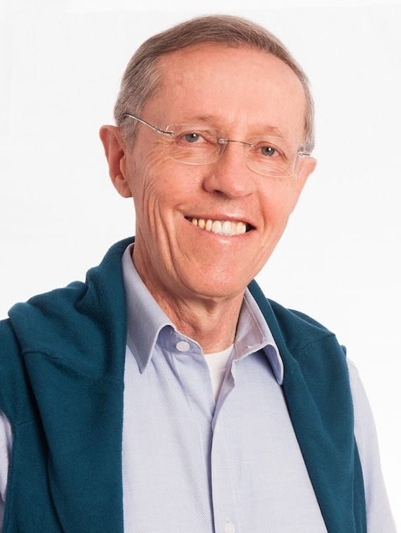

Senator of Colombia
- In office 20 July 2014 – 20 July 2018
- In office 20 July 2002 – 20 July 2006

Governor of Nariño
- In office 1 January 2008 – 1 January 2012
- Preceded by: Eduardo Zúñiga Erazo
- Succeeded by: Raúl Delgado Guerrero

Member of the Chamber of Representatives for Bogotá
- In office 20 July 1998 – 20 July 2002

Mayor of Pasto
- In office 1 January 1995 – 1 January 1998
- Preceded by: Eduardo Romo Rosero

Co-President of the Constituent Assembly of Colombia
- In office 15 January 1991 – 4 July 1991 Serving with Álvaro Gómez Hurtado and Horacio Serpa Uribe
- Succeeded by: Jimmy Pedreros Narváez

Minister of Health of Colombia
- In office 7 August 1990 – 26 October 1991
- President: César Gaviria
- Preceded by: Eduardo Díaz Uribe
- Succeeded by: Camilo González Posso

Personal details
- Born: Antonio José Navarro Wolff; 9 July 1948 Pasto, Nariño, Colombia
- Died: 1 November 2026 (aged 78)
- Party: Alternative Democratic Pole; Green Party (Since 2015)
- Other political affiliations: M-19 Democratic Alliance (1990–2005)
- Spouse(s): Amparo Erazo (-divorced); Marcela Bustamante Morón (1994–2026)
- Children: Camilo Navarro Erazo; Gabriel Navarro Bustamante; Alejandro Navarro Bustamante
- Education: University of Valle (BSE, 1972); Loughborough University (MIE, 1975)
- Profession: Engineer

Military service
- Allegiance: M-19
- Years of service: 1980–1990
- Rank: Commandant
- Battles/wars: Colombian conflict

Antonio José Navarro Wolff (9 July 1948 – 1 November 2026) was a Colombian engineer, politician and onetime combatant.

Navarro was at one juncture Commandant and leader of the 19th of April Movement (M-19), a past guerrilla movement that operated in Colombia in the 1970s and 1980s. After the demobilization through a peace agreement of the M-19, Navarro and others formed the M-19 Democratic Alliance, a political party of which Navarro became a leader of entering mainstream politics in Colombia. In 1990 he ran as a M-19 political candidate during the Colombian presidential elections finishing third and receiving 12.48% of the votes; he ran again unsuccessfully in the 1994 presidential election, and attempted to run for the 2006 presidential elections but lost the candidacy of his party during the primaries. In 1991 he was elected to the National Constituent Assembly, of which became Co-President along with Álvaro Gómez Hurtado and Horacio Serpa Uribe; it was this Assembly that drafted the Colombian Constitution of 1991 which remains the supreme law of the country.

He also served in Congress, being elected to serve both in the Chamber from 1998 to 2002, and the Senate from 2002 to 2006 and again since 2014; and elected Mayor of Pasto serving from 1995 to 1998, and Governor of Nariño from 2008 to 2012.

== Before M-19 ==
Antonio José was born in Pasto, on 9 July 1948, to Rafael Navarro Uribe and María Emma Wolff Pizarro. In 1972, Navarro graduated as a sanitary engineer from the University of Valle, after which he took postgraduate courses and eventually became a professor at the same university. He studied Environmental Engineering at Loughborough University, UK in 1976 on a scholarship from the Rockefeller Foundation, the British Council and the International Development Research Center (IDRC) of Canada.

As a sanitary engineer, he was an adviser of the Social Medicine Department of the University of Valle (1972), coordinator of the Multidisciplinary Research Centre for Rural Development (CIMDER, 1972–1977), international adviser of the IDRC (1976–1978), Professor at the University of Valle (1972–1978), director of the Curriculum of Sanitary Engineering at the university, and a private consultant.

== Militancy in M-19 ==
At the end of the 1970s, he became a part of the guerilla group M-19. Within the M-19, Navarro ascended to second-in-command of the organization. One of the most controversial episodes of M-19 was the take-over of the Palace of Justice by armed guerrillas. They pretended to demand a trial of President Belisario Betancur for violation of the peace accords. During the operation led by security forces to retake the Palace, a large group of guerrillas, civilians, magistrates and soldiers lost their lives— at least 53 civilian casualties were registered, including several members of the Supreme Court of Justice of Colombia. The siege has been catalogued as a holocaust and massacre by the Inter-American Court of Human Rights.

== Peace negotiations ==
Navarro coordinated peace negotiations for this movement during President Betancur's government in 1984 and 1985. He was named head of the Commission to organize the National Dialogue, along with Vera Grabe, Alfonso Jacquin, Andrés Almarales and Israel Santamaría. Talks were broken off, truces failed and the peace process died. In May 1985, the talks collapsed after an attack in a cafeteria in the city of Cali, when a soldier threw a grenade that exploded 10 cm away from Navarro, who was severely wounded. The facial nerve that controls the left part of the jaw was destroyed and he lost his left leg below the knee. M-19 received news that Navarro was to be attacked in the hospital, so he was evacuated to Mexico where the leg was amputated. He received a prosthesis in Cuba.

Later, Carlos Pizarro carried out peace negotiations with the government of President Virgilio Barco. The peace agreement was signed on 11 March 1990.

After signing the peace agreement, M-19 nominated its leader, Carlos Pizarro Leongómez to run as candidate for the presidency, but he was assassinated on a commercial flight from Bogotá to Barranquilla on 26 April 1990. After Pizarro's burial, the leaders of M-19 met and decided to continue with the peace process. They nominated Navarro for the presidency, who came in third in the balloting.

== Political life ==
In the 2000s, M-19 entered a leftist coalition of parties called the Alternative Democratic Pole and Navarro became its Secretary General.

Navarro became mayor of the city of Pasto, Congressman of Colombia and was one of the three collegiate presidents of the Constituent Assembly of Colombia writing the Colombian Constitution of 1991. He also served as Colombian Minister of Health.

In 2006, he ran for the presidency of Colombia, but lost to Carlos Gaviria in the party primaries. He then ran for the Senate and was elected. Later he was elected governor of Nariño of the PDA. After the election of Gustavo Petro as mayor of Bogotá, Navarro was appointed Secretary of Government. However he resigned in late March 2012 in order to be the Progressive Movement's spokesperson. He was also a member of Washington D.C.–based think tank the Inter-American Dialogue.

== Popular culture ==
Navarro is portrayed by the actor Fabio Rubiano as the character of Marco Navia in TV series Escobar, el patrón del mal.

== Death ==
Navarro died on 1 November 2026, at the age of 78.
