= Quintín Lame =

Colombian indigenous activist (1880–1967)

Manuel Quintín Lame Chantre
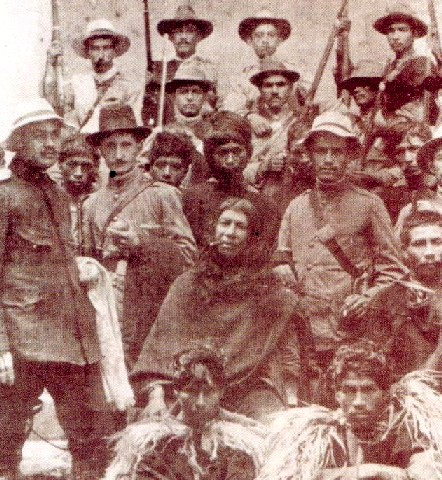
- Quintín Lame photographed here in the center smoking during his arrest.
- Born: October 23, 1880; Cauca, United States of Colombia
- Died: October 7, 1967 (aged 86); Ortega, Tolima, Colombia
- Other name: Juan Quintín Lame
- Known for: Leader of Indigenous Movements
- Political party: Conservative
- Spouse(s): Pioquinta León (1911-1917); Benilda León
- Parent(s): Manuel Lame and Dolores Chantre
- Military career
- Allegiance: Army of Colombia
- Service years: 1901-1903
- Conflicts: Thousand Days' War

Manuel Quintín Lame Chantre (1880–1967) was a Colombian indigenous rebel from the early 20th century who tried to form an independent indigenous republic.

He was born in El Borbollón, Cauca, son of Mariano Lame, of Paez origin, and Dolores Chantre, of mixed indigenous origins. During the war of 1885, his sister Licenia, was raped. His brother Feliciano was killed in the Thousand Days' War. In 1901, he joined the army of the Colombian Conservative Party. In 1911, he started the Indigenous Movement. In 1914, he tried to establish the Republic of Indigenas, formed by Cauca, Tolima, Huila and Valle. Because of this, he was arrested. His movement grew and became the "Guerra Racial". In 1921, after spending three years in jail, he joined the Tolima movement. In 1924, he wrote the book El pensamiento del indio que se educó en las selvas colombianas. He died in 1967 in Ortega, Tolima.

== Bibliography ==
- LAME CHANTRE, Manuel Quintín. Los pensamientos del indio que se educó en las selvas colombianas [1939]. Bogotá, Funcol, s.f.
- LAME, MANUEL QUINTÍN. Las luchas del indio que bajó de la montaña al valle de la "civilización". Selección y notas, Gonzalo Castillo Cárdenas. Bogotá, Rosca de Investigación y Acción Social, 1973.
- TELLO, Piedad, LAME, MANUEL QUINTÍN, in Gran Enciclopedia de Colombia del Círculo de Lectores, tomo de biografías
- TELLO, Piedad L. "Vida y lucha de Manuel Quintín Lame". Tesis de Grado, Departamento de Antropología, Universidad de los Andes, Bogotá, 1983.
- CASTRILLÓN ARBOLEDA, Diego. El Indio Quintín Lame. Bogotá, Tercer Mundo, 1971.
