= National Salvation Movement =

Far-right political party in Colombia

National Salvation Movement Movimiento de Salvación Nacional
- President: Enrique Gómez Martínez
- Founded: 4 July 1991; 35 years ago
- Legalised: 1 November 2021
- Dissolved: 2006 (first iteration)
- Split from: Colombian Conservative Party
- Headquarters: Calle 75 No. 10–10, Chapinero, Bogotá
- Ideology: National conservatism; Right-wing populism
- Political position: Far-right
- Colors: Light blue
- Chamber of Representatives: 1 / 188
- Senate: 4 / 108
- Governors: 0 / 32
- Mayors: 4 / 1,102

Party flag

Website
- https://salvacionnacional.com/ Defensores de la Patria - Political Movement; Colombia Abelardista - Civilian Movement

Logo until 2025

The National Salvation Movement (Spanish: Movimiento de Salvación Nacional, MSN) is a Colombian far-right political party founded in 1990 by Álvaro Gómez Hurtado. Originally established by dissident members of the Colombian Conservative Party, the party emerged as a conservative alternative to the traditional party leadership and became one of Colombia's most prominent minor political movements during the 1990s.

In the 1990 presidential election, Gómez finished second, outperforming the official Conservative Party candidate. The party subsequently maintained representation in both the Senate and the Chamber of Representatives.

Despite its defeat in the election, the party achieved its greatest political success in the election to the 1991 National Constituent Assembly, which was tasked with drafting a new constitution for Colombia, where it won 11 seats. The election, held in December 1990, took place under exceptional political circumstances amid a broader process of constitutional reform. For the campaign, Álvaro Gómez Hurtado sought support beyond traditional party lines, assembling what he described as a "supra-partisan" political movement.

Following electoral decline in the 2000s, the party lost its parliamentary presence and was dissolved after the 2006 parliamentary election.

The party was re-established in 2021 under the leadership of Enrique Gómez Martínez, a nephew of its founder. It contested the 2022 parliamentary election and nominated Gómez as its candidate in the 2022 presidential election, where he received 0.23% of the vote.

The National Salvation Movement has positioned itself in opposition to the government of Gustavo Petro. For the 2026 presidential election, the party supported lawyer Abelardo de la Espriella as its presidential candidate, with José Manuel Restrepo Abondano as its candidate for vice president. To support the campaign, the party adopted a new logo featuring a tiger and three claw marks in place of the rainbow previously used in its emblem.

In the 2026 parliamentary election, the party fielded an open Senate list headed by chairman Enrique Gómez Martínez. The party won four seats in the Senate and one seat in the Chamber of Representatives, marking a significant increase in its electoral support compared with the previous election and allowing it to retain its legal status.

In the first round of the presidential election, held on 31 May 2026, de la Espriella received 10,361,413 votes (43.74% of the vote), placing first among the candidates and advancing to the runoff election against Iván Cepeda.

== Electoral history ==
=== Presidential elections ===
Election year	Candidate	Running mate	First round		Second round		Result	Source(s)
Election year	Candidate	Running mate	Votes	%	Votes	%	Result	Source(s)
1990	Álvaro Gómez Hurtado	—N/a	1,433,913	23.89 (#2)	—N/a	—N/a	Lost	
2022	Enrique Gómez Martínez	Carlos Cuartas	48,643	0.23 (#6)	—N/a	—N/a	Lost	
2026	Abelardo de la Espriella	José Manuel Restrepo	10,361,499	43.74 (#1)	12,959,515	49.66 (#1)	Won	

=== Legislative elections ===
Election Year	House of Representatives			Senate		
Election Year	Votes	Percentage	Seats	Votes	Percentage	Seats
1991	327,845	6.25 (#4)	11 / 169	234,358	4.40 (#5)	5 / 102
1994	51,446	0.97 (#9)	1 / 163	100,385	1.92 (#4)	2 / 102
1998	53,074	0.60 (#14)	1 / 161	82,687	0.95 (#13)	1 / 102
2002	162,452	1.69 (#8)	2 / 166	78,080	0.84 (#23)	1 / 102
2006	27,531	0.31 (#25)	1 / 163	Did not participate		
2022	38,123	0.23 (#25)	0 / 169	31,289	0.18 (#14)	0 / 106
2026	410,416	2.18 (#8)	1 / 161	707,764	3.63 (#9)	4 / 103
