= Movimiento Armado Quintin Lame =

Colombian guerrilla movement

Flag of the Quintin Lame Armed Movement

The Quintin Lame Armed Movement (Spanish: Movimiento Armado Quintin Lame, MAQL) was an indigenous guerrilla group active from 1984 to May 1991 as the participant in the Colombian Armed Conflict.

== General info ==
Quintin Lame Armed Movement (Movimiento Armado Quintin Lame, MAQL) was founded in 1984 as an indigenous guerrilla movement that operated in the department of Cauca, a province in south central Colombia that is 40 percent indigenous and characterized by large landholdings, unequal land tenure, and conflict between indigenous reservations and landowners. The Quintin Lame was initially organized as a movement to extend indigenous lands through land invasions and to defend indigenous communities from hostile attacks from landowners, the military, government officials, and other guerrilla movements. The group negotiated with the Gaviria administration from August 1990 to May 1991, leading to its demobilisation and simultaneous participation in the Constituent Assembly. Their presence in the Assembly contributed to the fact that indigenous issues were prominently addressed, and major concessions and rights were incorporated into the Constitution of 1991.

== History ==
In 1974 in the south of Colombia, an indigenous peasant group known as Quintín Lame (CQL) emerged. This group, which received military training from the Marxist–Leninist Communist Party (PC-ML), was formed after the killing of regional indigenous leaders in Cauca by repressive forces of the state and large landowners. The CQL was thus constituted as a military self defense group. Thanks to an organization created years earlier by the indigenous leader Manuel Quintín Lame (1880–1967), the group had the support of many indigenous communities in the region of the Valle del Cauca, Huila, Tolima, and parts of the departments of Meta and Caquetá Department. The founders of the Quintín Lame armed group distinguished themselves from other armed groups of the time by their multicultural approach. The group included mestizos such as Gustavo Mejía, Pedro León Rodríguez, and Edgar Londoño; foreigners such as the Hungarian Pablo Tattay, Gabriel Soler from Argentina, and Teresa Tomish from Chile; and indigenous people from different ethnic communities in the south of the country. Until the early 1980s the CQL acted in self-defense of traditional territories and only used arms when territorial and political autonomy was threatened. The group's first military offensive took place in 1984 with an assault on Castilla, a small town in the Cauca department, and the takeover of the village of Santander de Quilichao. The Quintin Lame were involved in the Simón Bolívar Guerrilla Coordinating Board

== Demobilisation ==
During May 1991, following negotiation with the government, the Quintin Lame Armed Movement leadership decided to enter into the process of demobilisation, during which some 130 fighters of that guerrilla group surrendered their weapons, in exchange for government's promise of giving group one vote in the Assembly and a grant to pay each of its fighters $128 a month during a six-month period of adjustment to civilian life, as well as a promise of government investment to develop their communities. The treaty between Quintin Lame and government was signed by Jesus Antonio Bejarano, a government negotiator, at an Indian guerrilla camp near the southern town of Caldono.
