= Ortega, Tolima =

Ortega
- Municipality and town
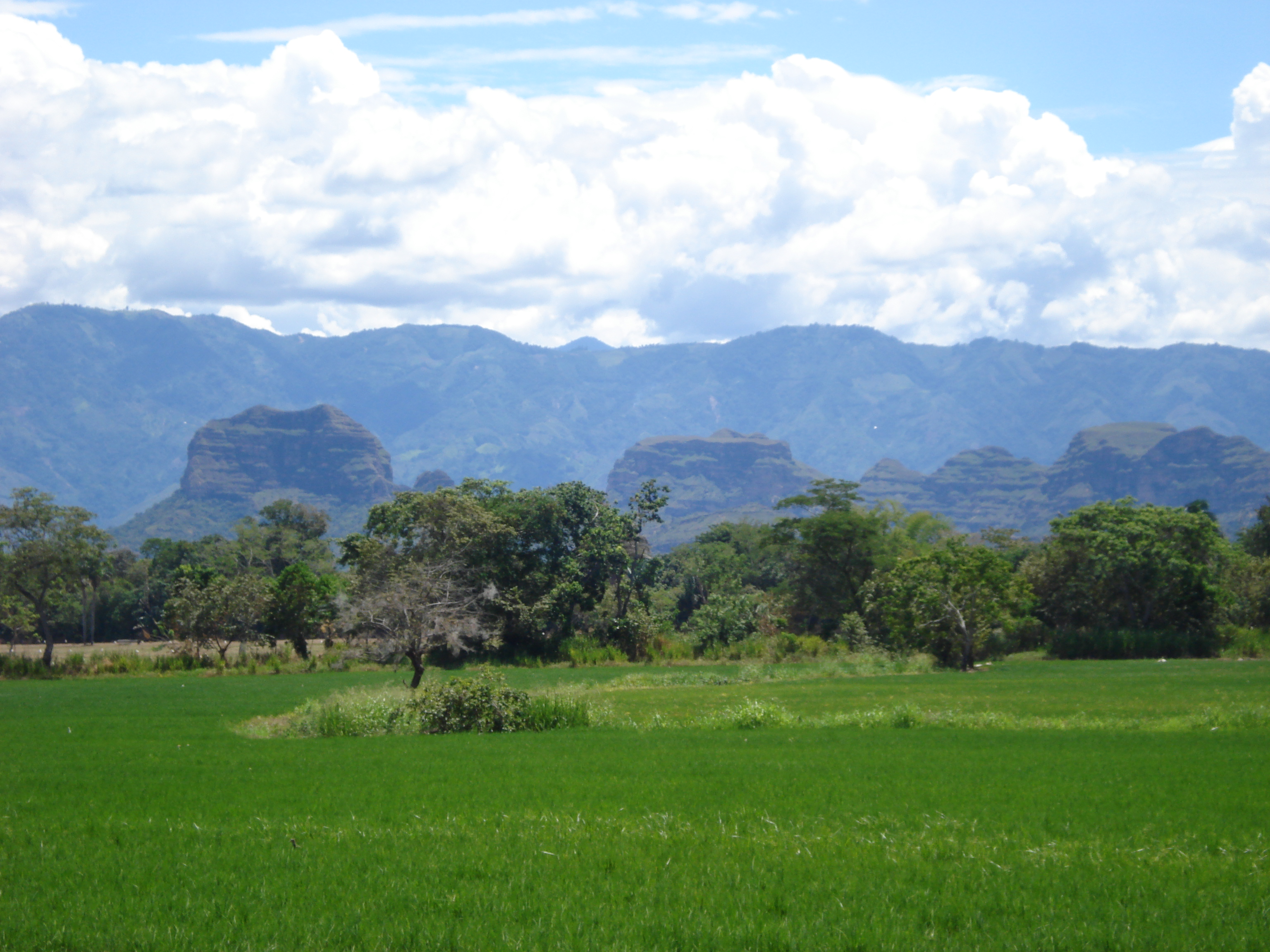
- View of the Cerros los Abechuchos in Ortega

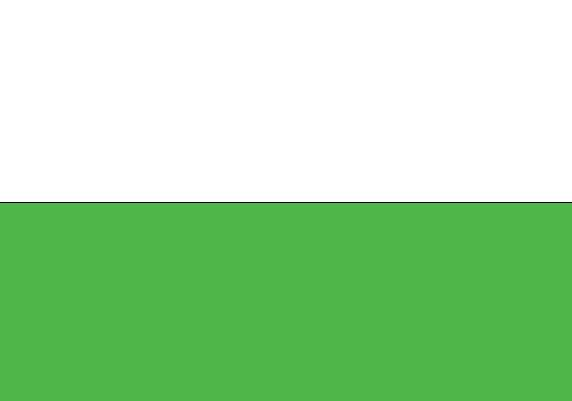
- Flag Coat of arms

- Location of the municipality and town of Ortega in the Tolima Department of Colombia
- Coordinates: 3°55′N 75°15′W
- Country: Colombia
- Department: Tolima

Government
  - Mayor: Omar Iván Carrillo Ramírez (2020-2023)

Area
  - Municipality and town: 945.93 km^{2} (365.23 sq mi)
- Elevation: 2,687 m (8,816 ft)

Population (2015)
  - Municipality and town: 45,524
  - Density: 48.126/km^{2} (124.65/sq mi)
  - Urban: 13,098
- Demonym: Orteguno
- Time zone: UTC-5 (Colombia Standard Time)
- Website: Official website

Ortega (Spanish pronunciation: [oɾˈteɣa]) is a town and municipality in the Tolima department of Colombia. Ortega is located at altitudes from 402 to 2,687 metres (1,319 to 8,816 ft) above sea level, and has a surface area of 945.93 square kilometres (365.23 sq mi). The average temperature ranges from 14 to 26 °C (57 to 79 °F).

== History ==
In 1572, a group composed of captain Diego Bocanegra, Luis de Morales, Vicente Valenzuela, Ambrosio de Morales Bocanegra, and forty soldiers that Diego Bocanegra had taken to conquer the native Pijao, established a town named Santiago de la Frontera. That first foundation was abandoned, due to Diego Bocanegra leaving for the troops commanded by Gonzalo Jiménez de Quesada, following a high court's mandate. In 1586, Diego Bocanegra undertook a second foundation and named the settlement Medina de las Torres. Because of the attacks by the Pijao on Medina de las Torres, the town disappeared. A third foundation was also unsuccessful because of the attacks by the Pijao.

Centuries later, on November 30, 1821, the Catholic Father Nicolás Ramírez rebuilt the town and named it Ortega, in an area of 98 square kilometres (38 sq mi).

== Panorama ==
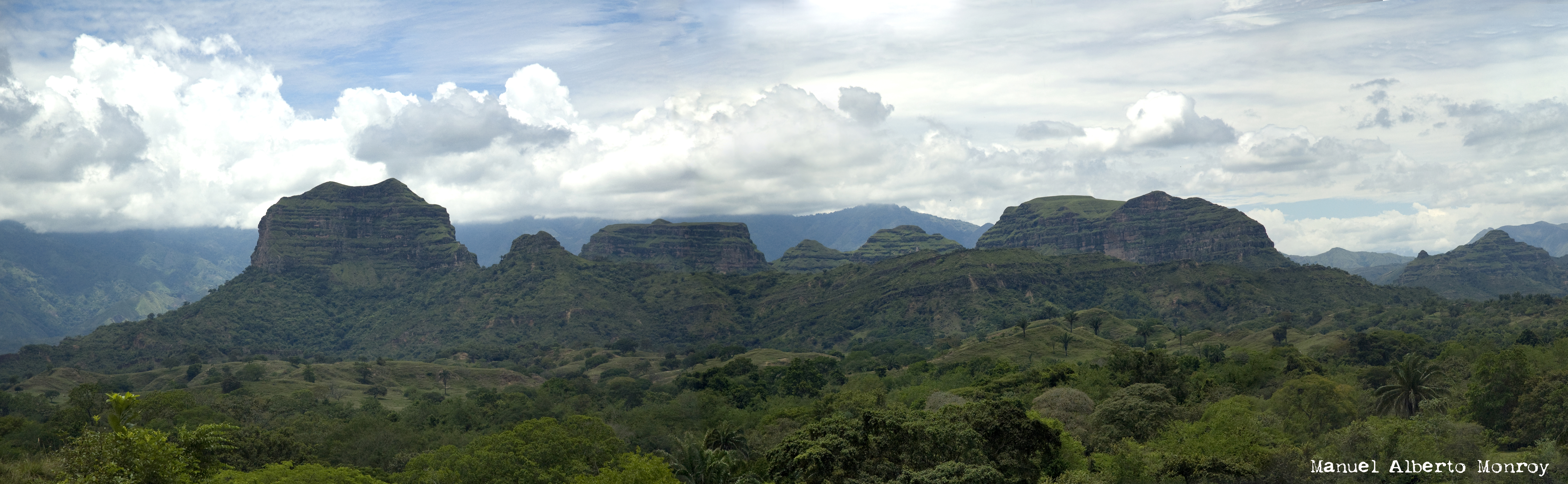
View of the Cerros de los Abechuchos in Ortega, Tolima
