= Álvaro Gómez Hurtado =

Colombian politician (1919–1995)

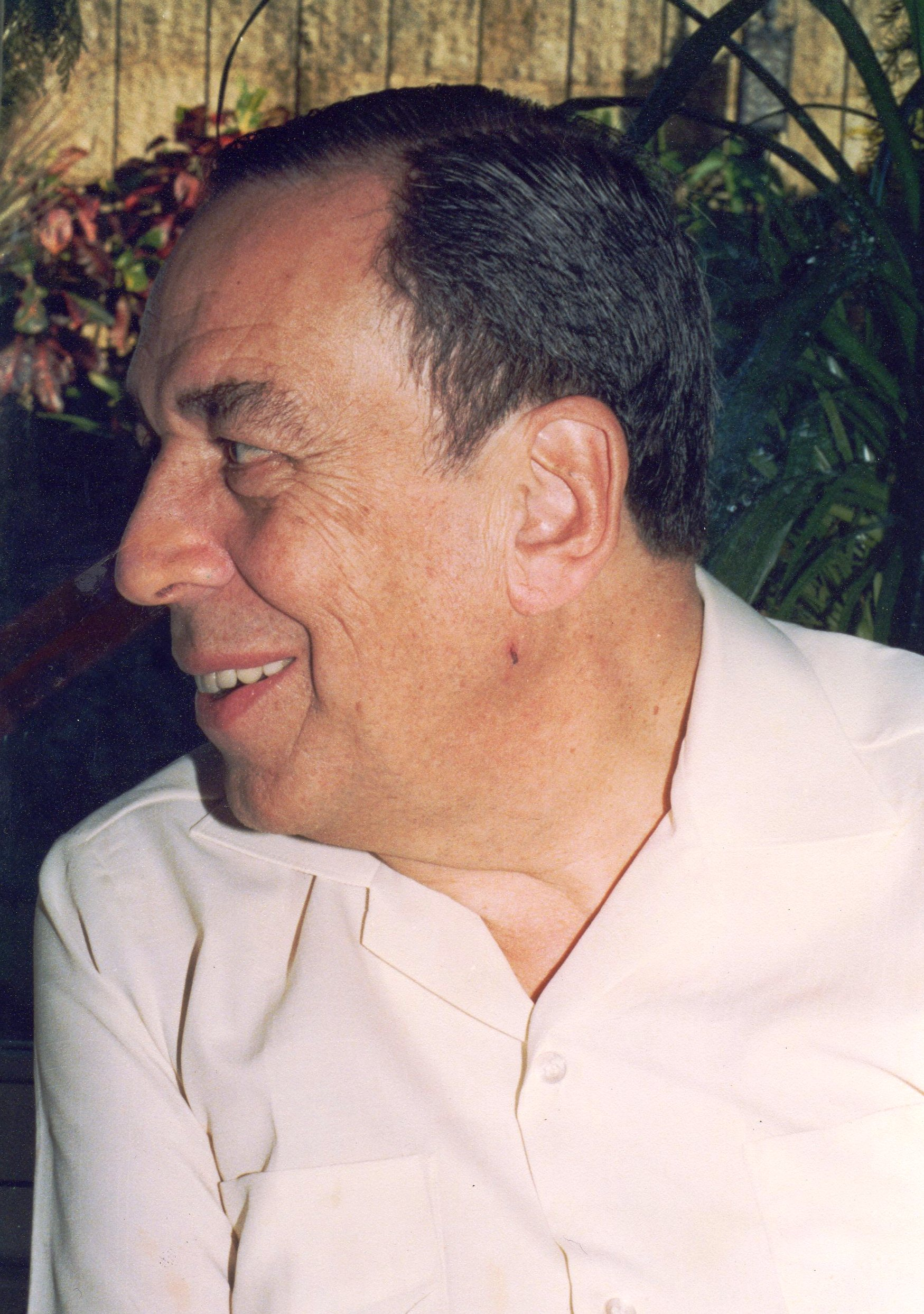

15th Colombia Ambassador to France
- In office 1991–1993
- President: César Gaviria
- Preceded by: Alfonso López Caballero
- Succeeded by: Miguel Gómez Martínez

Colombia Ambassador to the United States
- In office March 9, 1983 – December 17, 1985
- President: Belisario Betancur
- Preceded by: Jorge Salazar
- Succeeded by: Rodrigo Lloreda

Colombia Ambassador to Italy
- In office 1953–1953
- President: Roberto Urdaneta

Senator of Colombia
- In office 1951–1952

Member of the Chamber of Representatives
- In office 1949–1951
- Constituency: Cundinamarca
- In office 1944–1946
- Constituency: Cundinamarca

Colombia Ambassador to Switzerland
- In office 1947–1948
- President: Mariano Ospina Pérez

Personal details
- Born: May 8, 1919 Bogotá, Colombia
- Died: November 2, 1995 (aged 76) Bogotá, Colombia
- Party: National Salvation Movement
- Other political affiliations: Conservative
- Spouse: Margarita Escobar López (1946-1995)
- Children: Mauricio Gómez Escobar; Mercedes Gómez Escobar; Álvaro José Gómez Escobar
- Parent(s): Laureano Gómez (father); María Hurtado Cajiao (mother)
- Education: Pontifical Xavierian University
- Occupation: Journalist, politician
- Profession: Lawyer

Álvaro Laureano Miguel Gómez Hurtado A.K.A. Álvaro Gómez Hurtado (May 8, 1919 – November 2, 1995) was a Colombian lawyer, politician, painter, writer, journalist and former active member of the Colombian Conservative Party. Gómez was founder of conservative dissidence known as Movimiento de Salvación Nacional (National Salvation Movement), and their first president since 1990 to 1995, when he was murdered.

Gómez was a son of the former President of Colombia, Laureano Gómez, who ruled that country from 1950 to 1951, until he was forced to resigned by army forces commanded by the general Gustavo Rojas Pinilla. Gómez was seen as successor of his father, and his father's political enemies became his adversaries.

He is mostly remembered for being one of the writers of the Colombian Constitution of 1991, for running three times for the presidency, without success (in 1974, 1986 and 1990), and for his murder at the hands of the Revolutionary Armed Forces of Colombia. He served separate appointments as ambassador to Switzerland, Italy, the United States and France, beginning in the 1940s.

Gómez also was the founder of Universidad Sergio Arboleda, former director and journalist of their family journal's El Siglo and owner of Noticiero 24 Horas, one of the most important TV News in Colombia from 80s to 2000s. His hobbies encompassed painting, writing poems, and other activities non-related to politics.

Gómez is considered in Colombia as the most important nationalist of conservative in that country, and his thinking continue to inspiring new generations of young politician in Colombia. Also is frequently cited by politicians of both ideologies as a reference of peace and understanding.

== Early years ==
Álvaro Gómez Hurtado was born as the second of four children to Laureano Gómez, a newspaper publisher who later became president of Colombia. His mother was María Hurtado Cajiao. His siblings are Cecilia, Rafael and Enrique. The family grew up in La Candelaria, a traditional neighborhood of Bogotá. The children attended private schools in Brussels, Belgium and Buenos Aires, Argentina while their father served as a diplomat. After his family's return to Bogotá, Gómez went to the Colegio de San Bartolomé, a preparatory school, graduating in 1936.

He studied law at the Pontifical Xavierian University and graduated as a lawyer in 1941. His thesis was entitled Influencias del Estoicismo en el Derecho Romano ("The Influence of Stoicism in Roman Law").

== Journalism ==
He began writing for the newspaper El Siglo, which was owned by his father. He later founded a weekly business magazine called Síntesis Económica (Economic Synthesis) and created and produced a television news show called Noticiero 24 Horas ("24 Hours News").

== Political career ==
Gómez Hurtado's first political office was as elected councilman for the city of Bogotá. He next ran for the Chamber of Representatives of Colombia and was elected for a four-year term. After finishing his term, he was elected for the Senate.

Gómez was appointed as a "plenipotentiary minister" several times. He was also appointed as Ambassador to the United Nations, Switzerland, Italy, the United States and France.

=== Presidential candidacies ===
Gómez founded the National Salvation Movement. He ran (unsuccessfully) as its candidate for president three times: in 1974 against Alfonso López Michelsen, in 1986 against Virgilio Barco and in 1990 against César Gaviria.

=== President of the Constituent Assembly ===
He was elected to the Constituent Assembly, which created the new Colombian Constitution of 1991. He was elected as co-president of the Constituent Assembly along with Horacio Serpa and Antonio Navarro. After the Constitution had been written and ratified, Gómez left politics and focused on journalism and academia.

== Kidnapping ==
In 1988, Gómez was kidnapped by the M-19 guerrillas, and was released after the intervention of Álvaro Leyva.

== Assassination ==
Álvaro Gómez was murdered by gunmen on the morning of November 2, 1995, in Bogotá, while leaving the Sergio Arboleda University, where he was a visiting professor. FARC-EP claimed responsibility for his murder in letter to the Special Justice for Peace (JEP) tribunal in October 2020. In a clandestine book of letters from FARC founder Manuel Marulanda, titled Documentos y Correspondencia Manuel Marulanda Vélez (1993-1998), there are six mentions that the guerrilla committed the assassination.

However, the family of Gómez Hurtado rejected the FARC's claim, claiming that it was a strategy to divert the attention away from the 25-year long and ongoing investigation into his assassination, that has been collecting evidence that might incriminate former president Ernesto Samper (1994–1998). Gómez Hurtado was denouncing the financing of Samper's presidential campaign by drug cartels, and Samper has been a supporter of peace talks with the FARC guerrilla, and as such Gómez Hurtado's family believe that the evidence shows that it was a state crime.

According to journalist Daniel Pardo, the judicial investigations in Hurtado's case, which carried for many years, resulted in "impunity".

According to writer Juan Constaín, during the same attack, Hurtdo's bodyguard José Huertas was also assassinated.

== Published work ==
- La Revolución en América (Revolution in the Americas)
- La Calidad de Vida (The Quality of Life)
- Soy libre. (I am Free)
- Compilación de conferencias dictadas en la Universidad Sergio Arboleda. (Compilation of his lectures at Sergio Arboleda University)

== Marriage and family ==
Álvaro Gómez was married to Margarita Escobar López and had three children: Mauricio, Mercedes and Álvaro José.
