= Constituent Assembly of Colombia =

1991 constitutional convention in Colombia

The Constituent Assembly of Colombia (Spanish: Asamblea Nacional Constituyente de Colombia) was formed on February 5, 1991, to draft the Colombian Constitution of 1991. It was dissolved in July 1991, after the new document was adopted nationwide.

== Background ==
Throughout the later half of the 20th century, many different sectors of Colombian public and political opinion, both outside and inside the Colombian Conservative Party and the Colombian Liberal Party, had developed an increasing desire to extensively reform the nation's aging 1886 constitution into a more modern document, according to the changing needs and realities of the citizens and their context, as well as a way to curb ongoing violence.

Some felt that the previous constitution, in spite of several amendments that had been implemented (in 1910, for example), was no longer applicable as a whole and had to be discarded in favor of a more progressive document. Others recognized that despite the presence of what they saw as some enduring positive qualities and values (such as the open proclamation of Colombia as a Catholic nation, considered as essential by some), a greater degree of political pluralism and civil liberties was still necessary in order to better address the country's problems. Apparently only a relatively small number opposed any modifications outright.

In addition to all this, many critics felt that the country was exhausted of and needed a respite from what some called the "old political class", and that a new constitution would be of use in achieving that scenario.

Despite a generally positive attitude towards change among the population, most of the early attempts to call for an extensive amendment of the existing constitution (notably in 1957, under General Gustavo Rojas Pinilla) or to convoke a Constituent Assembly ultimately failed because of different types of political and congressional infighting, but the aspiration never disappeared entirely.

In particular, during the 1980s, as several rocky peace negotiations were carried out with guerrilla groups, such as the 19th of April Movement and the EPL, the desire to change the constitution as part of the potential peace agreements began to gradually become part of a wide national consensus.

After the murder of Luis Carlos Galán in 1989 (and later those of Bernardo Jaramillo and Carlos Pizarro in early 1990) and his replacement as the Liberal presidential candidate by César Gaviria, a civic movement made up of different academic and student sectors, some of which had backed the former candidate, eventually proposed that a nonbinding "seventh ballot" (séptima papeleta) should be included in the March 1990 legislative elections, asking the electorate to pronounce itself in favor or against the future convocation of a National Constituent Assembly.

This proposal was tacitly accepted by the government of president Virgilio Barco Vargas and when an informal count of the votes was authorized by the electoral authorities, some two million voters had voted in favor of the initiative by turning in their "seventh ballots".

This symbolic demonstration of public opinion gave the Barco administration what it perceived as a favorable mandate in order to proceed with the consultation process in a more formal manner, and thus the execution of an official plebiscite was decreed on May 3, 1990, a move which was then authorized by Colombia's Supreme Court.

The date for the plebiscite was set to coincide with the May 27, 1990 presidential elections. Five of the six million voters that participated in the elections voted in favor the initiative. The newly elected president, César Gaviria, who had been chosen by 47% of the voters (some 2,891,808 votes), signed on August 27, 1990, a presidential decree that called for the election of a National Constituent Assembly on December 9.

The Supreme Court found no fault in Gaviria's decree, and unprecedentedly declared that the future Constituent Assembly would be able to freely pronounce itself on all matters, except for international treaties and the duration of the period of those officials elected during 1990.

== Election of the Assembly ==
On December 9, the 70 delegates that would make up the new Assembly were elected. Surprisingly for some, participation was low and only 3,710,567 votes were cast, with an abstention of nearly 75% of the electorate.

The FARC base at Casa Verde, (La Uribe, Meta) was bombed by the military on that same date. The FARC had been participating on and off in negotiations with both of the preceding administrations, but the climate had turned sour and dangerous, amid which each party blamed the other for bloody acts of political violence, breaches of a declared cease fire and other mutual recriminations.

25 of the elected delegates were from the Colombian Liberal Party, 19 from the newly demobilized M-19 guerrilla movement, 11 from the Conservative Party's dissenting leader Álvaro Gómez Hurtado and his National Salvation Movement, 9 from the main Colombian Conservative Party, and two representatives each for indigenous peoples, Protestant Christians, and the Patriotic Union. Additionally, the government assigned four more delegates, two for the demobilized EPL, one for the Revolutionary Worker's Party and one for the Quintín Lame indigenous guerrilla movement.

The Assembly was inaugurated on February 5, 1991. A shared tripartite co-presidency was elected among the participating delegates: Horacio Serpa Uribe from the Liberal Party, Álvaro Gómez Hurtado from National Salvation, and Antonio Navarro Wolff from the M-19.

== Main Discussions ==
The government presented the Assembly its own version of a draft constitution, which had several innovations that followed new international standards and principles, which included the explicit acknowledgement of human rights guarantees, ethnic diversity and political pluralism as significant ideological concerns. The entire document had rough edges and was not accepted as a whole outright, but important elements of the same became the basis for many of the debates among the different delegates.

Additionally, citizen participation in the discussions was one of the new elements introduced through the propositions that different academic, labor, social and political associations presented before the Assembly for further debate.

The Assembly also reestablished the position of vice president.

=== The Extradition Debate ===
Amid much controversy, externally and internally, the Constituent Assembly decided in favor of prohibiting the extradition of Colombian nationals.

Critics of this decision considered that the move was a sign of submission to the threats of drug lords (the so-called "extraditables", which included Pablo Escobar) and would create friction in Colombia's relations with the United States, while those in favor alleged that it was a concession to nationalism and a way to respect the country's own sovereignty. In particular, the demobilized M-19 delegates strongly held this position.

Most observers would tend to agree that there is evidence of the drug cartel's intention of influencing the debate by trying to pressure or buy off individual delegates, but not of their being directly and unilaterally responsible for the outcome. Others would tend to disagree and place the blame for the removal of extradition on their shoulders.

This prohibition was lifted in November 1997, but the newly reintroduced terms for extradition indicated that its application could not be retroactive (for crimes committed before 1997).

== Revocation of Congress ==
The Constituent Assembly eventually reached the conclusion that the revocation of the Colombian Congress was a necessity, in order to prevent any possible legislative counter-reform by sectors of what was termed by observers as the "old political class".

Most of Congress was logically against this move, and a few legislators placed the blame on the demobilized M-19 members, though they were not the only ones in favor of the decision.

On June 8, 1991, president César Gaviria and the three co-presidents of the Assembly reached an "agreement" on the matter with the Colombian Liberal Party's leader, Alfonso López Michelsen, whose party represented 59% of Congress and about 35.7% of the Constituent Assembly. It was agreed that Congress would be revoked, but that the Assembly delegates would not be able to participate as candidates in the new elections, in addition to any public officials that had not resigned at least one year before, nor would any high government officials that did not resign by June 14.

The "agreement" was publicly presented as a "recommendation", in order to prevent possible legal action against it (there were precedents of such "agreements" being declared unconstitutional under previous administrations). The "recommendation" was approved by the Constituent Assembly and became transitional constitutional law, which secured its legal applicability.

A provisional legislative body, the Special Commission or "Congresito" ("small Congress") of 36 members (half of which could be Assembly delegates) was designated on July 4 by the Assembly, to fill the legislative vacuum until the October 6 elections could take place under the new constitution. The Special Commission sessioned twice, from July 15 to October 4 and from November 1 to December 1, 1991.

== End of the Assembly ==
The new constitution was proclaimed on July 4, 1991, and the Assembly dissolved itself shortly after that event.

== See also ==
- Politics of Colombia
- History of Colombia
- Colombian Constitution of 1991
