= 1990 Colombian parliamentary election =

Parliamentary elections were held in Colombia on 11 March 1990 alongside local elections and an unofficial referendum on electing a Constitutional Assembly.

== Background ==
After the murder of presidential candidate Luis Carlos Galán in August 1989, students started a movement calling for a referendum "for peace and democracy" to be held on 21 January 1990. However, under pressure from drug cartels, the government rejected the proposal. The students then set up the "We can still save Colombia" movement, which called for a referendum alongside the general elections on 11 March 1990 on establishing a Constitutional Assembly.

Whilst the referendum campaign remained unofficial, it was encouraged by the Ministry of Government. Voters cast votes with six ballots for various levels of government. The campaign encouraged them to add a seventh ballot, "la séptima papeleta", with their referendum vote on it.

== Campaign ==
The campaign was marked by violence from left- and right-wing paramilitary groups linked to drug cartels. Several politicians were killed. Two days before the election the 19th of April Movement signed a peace treaty with the government and participated in the elections.

== Results ==
=== Senate ===
Party	Votes	%	Seats	+/–
Colombian Liberal Party	4,470,853	58.54	66	+8
Social Conservative Party	2,383,363	31.21	38	–5
Conservative National Movement	147,953	1.94	1	New
Colombian Communist Party	35,274	0.46	0	New
Metapolitical Unitary Movement	23,264	0.30	0	New
National Popular Alliance	492	0.01	0	New
Coalitions of parties	358,246	4.69	7	–
Other parties	207,458	2.72	2	–
Blank votes	10,242	0.13	–	–
Total	7,637,145	100.00	114	0
Valid votes	7,637,145	99.78		
Invalid votes	17,005	0.22		
Total votes	7,654,150	100.00		
Registered voters/turnout	13,793,566	55.49		
Source: Nohlen

=== Chamber of Representatives ===
Party	Votes	%	Seats	+/–
Colombian Liberal Party	4,500,985	59.12	119	+21
Social Conservative Party	2,381,898	31.28	62	–18
Conservative National Movement	148,046	1.94	3	New
Patriotic Union	26,682	0.35	1	–2
Metapolitical Unitary Movement	22,571	0.30	0	New
National Popular Alliance	601	0.01	0	New
Coalitions of parties	301,659	3.96	10	–
Other parties	219,951	2.89	4	–
Blank votes	11,220	0.15	–	–
Total	7,613,613	100.00	199	0
Valid votes	7,613,613	99.76		
Invalid votes	18,081	0.24		
Total votes	7,631,694	100.00		
Registered voters/turnout	13,793,566	55.33		
Source: Nohlen

=== Referendum ===
Choice	Votes	%
For	2,235,493	95
Against	117,000	5
Invalid/blank votes		–
Total		100
Registered voters/turnout		
Source: Direct Democracy

== Aftermath ==
Following the unofficial referendum, President Virgilio Barco Vargas issued decree 927 on 3 May calling for a referendum on electing a Constitutional Assembly alongside the presidential elections on 27 May. Although this was in violation of article 218 of the constitution, which gave Congress sole rights to reform the constitution, the referendum was approved by the Supreme Court. The Assembly was elected in December 1990, and produced the 1991 constitution.
