= Colombian Constitution of 1991 =

Colombia's current Constitution

Constitution of Republic of Colombia
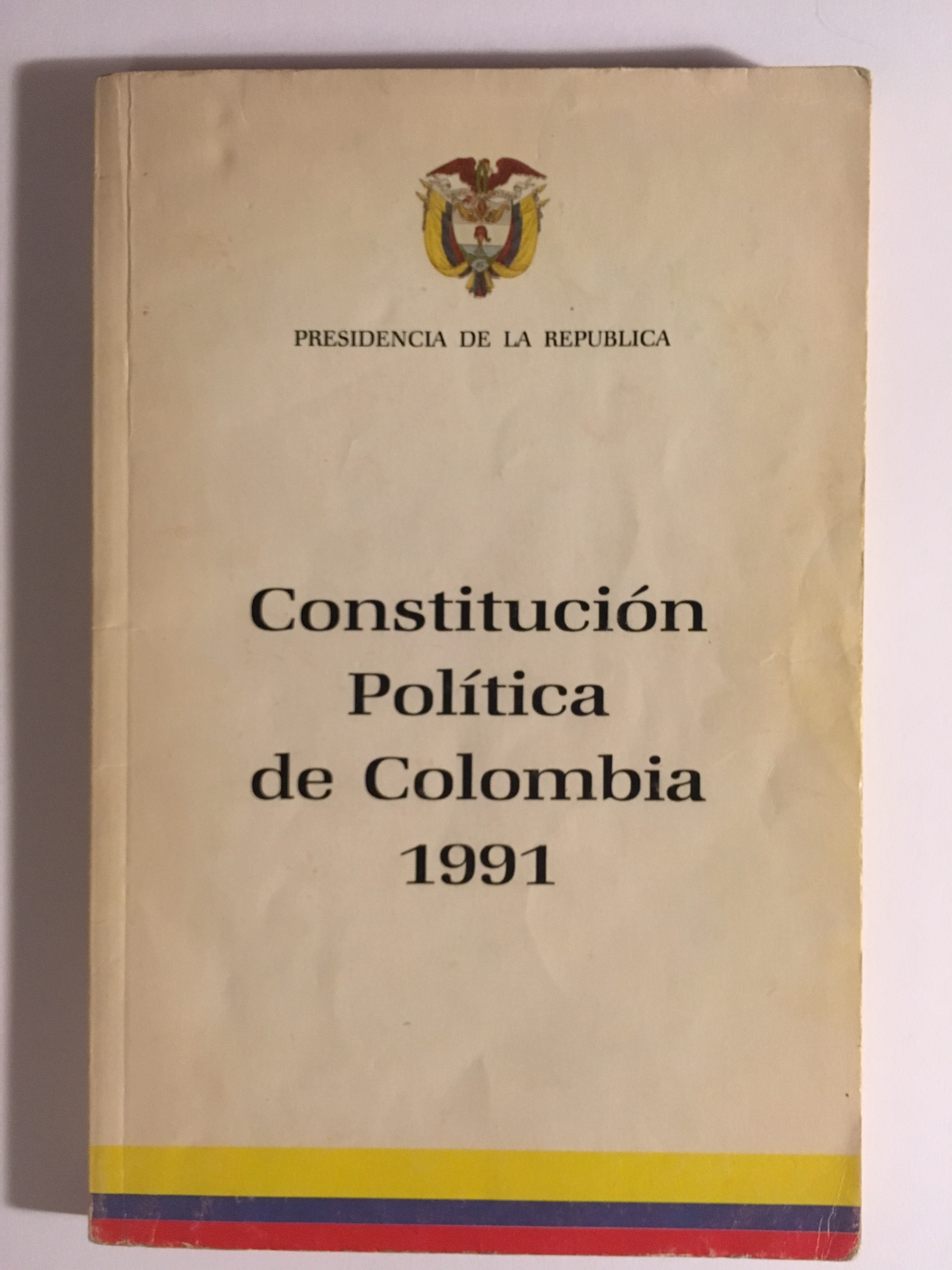

Overview
- Jurisdiction: Republic of Colombia
- Ratified: July 6, 1991
- Date effective: July 7, 1991
- System: Unitary presidential republic

Government structure
- Branches: 3
- Chambers: Bicameral (Senate, Chamber of Representatives)
- Executive: President
- Judiciary: Supreme, Constitutional Court, Council of State
- Federalism: No
- Electoral college: No
- Author: Constituent Assembly of Colombia
- Signatories: 70 members of the Constituent Assembly of Colombia

The Political Constitution of Colombia of 1991 (Spanish: Constitución Política de Colombia de 1991), is the Constitution of the Republic of Colombia. It was promulgated in Constitutional Gazette number 114 on Sunday, July 7, 1991, and is also known as the Constitution of Rights. It replaced the Political Constitution of 1886 and was issued during the presidency of the liberal César Gaviria.

It is divided up into eight sections, under titles.

== History ==
In the late 1980s, Colombia was facing a period of unprecedented violence. Although political violence had been commonplace in the country's history since the 19th century, and Colombia had been embroiled in an armed conflict primarily against guerrilla groups since the 1960s, in the 1980s the list of actors involved in the armed conflict became increasingly complex and the violence took on new forms. The conflict now involved new guerrilla movements, paramilitary groups and violent drug cartels (most famously the Medellín Cartel of Pablo Escobar). Politically, the National Front arrangement (1958–1974) between Colombia's two dominant parties, the Conservatives and the Liberals was widely seen as delegitimizing the political system by severely limiting third parties and other movements' political participation. Although the strict application of the National Front ended with the 1974 election, the power-sharing aspects of the system were dismantled only gradually - only in 1986 did President Virgilio Barco form a single-party Liberal government, after the Conservatives had rejected his offer of three ministries in his administration.

A series of assassinations and terrorist attacks in 1988 and 1989 increased popular demands for political and constitutional reform, as the country's existing political institutions were seen as broken in the face of the wave of extreme violence. 1989 witnessed the assassination of 12 judicial officers, the assassination of Liberal presidential candidate Luis Carlos Galán on August 18 in Soacha, the bombing of the El Espectador newspaper's offices in Bogotá on September 2, the in-flight explosion of Avianca Flight 203 on November 27 and the bombing of the DAS headquarters on December 6 causing the death of 70 people. In 1990, two other presidential candidates were assassinated - Bernardo Jaramillo of the Patriotic Union (UP) was killed March 22, 1990, and Carlos Pizarro of the AD M-19 was shot on April 26, 1990. The August 1989 assassination of Luis Carlos Galán, who was the early favourite to win the 1990 elections, shocked public opinion in Colombia and led, seven days later, to a 'silent march' (Marcha del silencio) organized by university students in Bogotá. The organizers' original objective was to express their rejection of indiscriminate violence, which had claimed the lives of an average of 11 people per day in 1988.

=== Previous attempts at constitutional reform ===
One of the factors which made constitutional change difficult was that the 1886 Constitution could only be amended by the Congress. Article 218 of the Constitution of 1886, as it stood in 1990, stated that the Constitution could only be amended by a law (legislative act, or Acto Legislativo) passed by Congress:

ARTICULO 218. La Constitución, salvo lo que en materia de votación ella dispone en otros artículos, sólo podrá ser reformada por un Acto Legislativo, discutido primeramente y aprobado por el Congreso en sus sesiones ordinarias; publicado por el Gobierno, para su examen definitivo en la siguiente legislatura ordinaria; por ésta nuevamente debatido, y, últimamente, aprobado por la mayoría absoluta de los individuos que componen cada Cámara. Si el Gobierno no publicare oportunamente el proyecto de Acto Legislativo, lo hará el Presidente del Congreso.
ARTICLE 218. The Constitution, [...] may only be amended by a Legislative Act, first discussed and adopted by Congress in its regular sessions; published by the Government, for final consideration at the next regular legislative session; by it again debated, and ultimately approved by the absolute majority of the individuals which compose each House. If the Government does not promptly publish the draft legislative act, the President of Congress will do so.

The constitutional reforms which, among other things, set-up the National Front, were approved by a national plebiscite in 1957. However, the text approved by voters in the 1957 plebiscite reiterated that any future constitutional amendments could only be passed by Congress in the manner prescribed by article 218. Article 13 of the Legislative Decree 0247 of 1957 (Decreto Legislativo Numero 0247 de 1957) read:

ARTICULO 13. En adelante las reformas constitucionales sólo podrán hacerse por el Congreso, en la forma establecida por el artículo 218 de la Constitución.
ARTICLE 13. Henceforth constitutional reforms may only be passed by Congress, in the manner prescribed by Article 218 of the Constitution

Notwithstanding these legal difficulties, several presidents beginning attempted to reform parts of the constitution, but most saw their efforts rebuffed by the Supreme Court of Justice or political complications. In 1977, under President Alfonso López Michelsen, Congress passed a constitutional amendment convening a constitutional assembly to amend the constitution only as it pertained to departmental/municipal administration and the judiciary (courts, public prosecution, constitutional jurisdiction). On May 5, 1978, the Supreme Court of Justice ruled the project unconstitutional. In its verdict, the court argued that Congress' power to amend the constitution under article 218 was an exclusive power which it could not delegate.

In December 1979, Congress approved President Julio César Turbay's constitutional reform initiative. The reform made substantial changes to the administration of justice, public prosecutions and the process of judicial review by the Supreme Court. Following a tortuous court challenge, the Supreme Court rendered a controversial ruling on the constitutional amendments in November 1981, striking down the entire project because of procedural defects in the legislative procedure.

In 1986, faced with the urgency of presenting some tangible proof of the "democratic opening" (liberalization) that left-wing movements and guerrillas had been incessantly demanding, the Congress passed a constitutional amendment allowing for the direct election of mayors (hitherto appointed by departmental governors). There was growing clamour to reform the 1886 constitution, accused of 'closing' political institutions, limiting opportunities for the political participation of minorities and not permitting the "democratic opening" which would guarantee the reincorporation to civilian life of armed rebel groups.

=== Early attempts at reform under the Barco presidency ===
In 1986, Liberal candidate Virgilio Barco was elected to the presidency on a platform of national reconciliation. In January 1988, Barco unexpectedly revived the idea of substantial constitutional change by proposing the organization of a plebiscite, alongside the March 1988 local elections, to repeal article 13 of the 1957 plebiscite. The president hoped that a plebiscite would give legitimacy to the repeal of this article (which had also been approved by plebiscite). However, Barco was forced to shelve the idea because of the lack of political consensus around his proposal.

Instead, in February 1988, Barco signed a bipartisan agreement with leaders of the Liberal and Conservative parties (the Acuerdo de la Casa de Nariño) which included agreement on the organization of a "process of institutional readjustment" - the creation of a constituent body, originating in Congress, which would submit a proposal for constitutional reform to Congress. The process was suddenly halted by the Council of State's ruling on April 4, 1988, which declared it to be unconstitutional. A later attempt to resuscitate the original idea of a plebiscite was rejected by the government itself in December 1988, after a group of congressmen had tried to add a question banning extradition.

Meanwhile, Barco's policy of national reconciliation had been successful - four guerrilla groups demobilized between 1989 and 1990. The M-19 was the first group to accept the government's offer to dialogue in 1988, culminating in the movement surrendering their weapons in March 1990. The M-19's demobilized members became a political party, known as the Democratic Alliance M-19 (AD M-19), in 1990. In 1991, the Workers' Revolutionary Party (PRT), most fronts of the Popular Liberation Army (EPL) and the Movimiento Armado Quintin Lame (MAQL) all demobilized. One of the terms for their demobilization was their (limited) participation in a constituent assembly. The Revolutionary Armed Forces of Colombia (FARC) supported a new constitution, but did not demobilize. The left-wing Patriotic Union (UP), created in 1985 as the FARC and the Communist Party's legal political wing, also supported a new constitution.

=== Student movement and the séptima papeleta ===
A student-led movement called Todavía podemos salvar a Colombia ("We can still save Colombia"), born from the August 1989 'silent march' and predominantly spearheaded by student and faculty from the most prestigious private universities of Bogotá (Universidad Externado de Colombia, Universidad del Rosario, Pontificia Universidad Javeriana, Universidad de los Andes), proposed the formation of a constituent assembly. In 1989, the movement had gathered over 30,000 signatures for an unsuccessful petition asking the president to convene a plebiscite to reform the constitution. Some months later, the students promoted the so-called séptima papeleta, or 'seventh ballot paper', as an unofficial plebiscite for a constituent assembly to be held alongside the March 1990 legislative election. The name séptima papeleta meant to indicate that the unofficial ballot for a constituent assembly would be in addition to the six other official ballot papers (senators, representatives, departmental assemblies, mayors, municipal councils and the Liberal presidential primary).

The séptima papeleta was the brainchild of Fernando Carillo, a young Harvard graduate and constitutional lawyer, who at the time was teaching law in Bogotá's three main private universities. In February 1990, Carrillo published an article in El Tiempo, the first to use the term séptima papeleta and explaining the objectives of his idea. Carrillo argued that the unofficial vote would "create a political fact" and "set the record that public opinion wants a constituent assembly", while the expression of popular sovereignty would keep the courts from invalidating it. Carrillo's idea immediately received substantial support from the political and media elites of the country. El Tiempo, Colombia's largest newspaper, enthusiastically supported the movement and later provided some of the material support necessary to print the ballots. Liberal presidential candidate César Gaviria supported the idea and was the first presidential contender to speak about it publicly. Former President López Michelsen supported the idea, and further proposed that the government issue a state of siege decree ordering the official counting of the seventh ballot papers. On 10 March, a day before the election, President Barco gave his personal support to the séptima papeleta. Most Liberal factions also supported the séptima papeleta, with the only significant Liberal opposition coming from former president Turbay and Liberal presidential candidate Hernando Durán Dussán. Álvaro Gómez Hurtado, leader of the conservative National Salvation Movement (MSN), initially opposed constitutional reform. The strongest support for the séptima papeleta came from the legal left-wing parties, the UP and the new AD M-19. The FARC, for their part, proposed an entirely new constitution written by a constituent assembly, which would be convened by a plebiscite.

The idea of the séptima papeleta was similar to the conclusions of a 1988 government report prepared by Manuel José Cepeda, the son of then-communications minister Fernando Cepeda, for President Barco. Based on a detailed analysis of the constitutional jurisprudence of the Supreme Court, Cepeda had concluded that the 1886 constitution could be reformed through a plebiscite or constituent assembly, as long as it was convened by the people.

On March 1, 1990, the National Registrar informed students that while he could not order the counting of the votes for a constituent assembly, neither could he ban the seventh ballot from being deposited. In short, the séptima papeleta would not affect the validity of votes for the six official contests. The unofficial count showed over 2.2 million votes in favour of a constituent assembly, out of over 7.6 million votes cast in the election.

=== Decree 927 and the 27 May Referendum ===
On May 3, 1990, President Barco issued Decree 927, (Note: The decree was issued in exercise of the exceptional state of siege powers granted to the president under article 121 of the 1886 constitution.) ordering the electoral authorities to count the votes for an official (but non-binding) vote convening a constitutional assembly, to be held alongside the May 27 presidential election. The decree claimed that intensified violence had created "a popular clamour for institutions to be strengthened". It made reference to the success of the séptima papeleta in March, stated that the popular will should be recognized and warned that thwarting the "popular movement in favour of institutional change" would weaken the country's political institutions. The government claimed that it was acting to facilitate the expression of the popular will.

The contents of the decree were largely the fruit of conversations between the government, the Liberal party and the two rival factions of the Conservative party. The parliamentary left was excluded from the talks, but they nevertheless welcomed decree 927. On the other hand, the decree was criticized by the Movimiento Estudiantil por la Constituyente (Student Movement for the Constituent), a rival of the Todavía podemos salvar a Colombia student movement, this one largely led by students from public universities. They criticized the use of the term 'constitutional assembly' rather than 'constituent assembly', fearing that the former was a way for Liberal party 'barons' to seize control of the process. Several Conservative politicians likewise criticized this aspect.

The decree was challenged in court, with its opponents claiming that there was no relationship between the state of siege under which the decree was proclaimed and the measures it provided and that it violated article 218 of the constitution (as well as article 13 of the 1957 plebiscite). In the opinion of the public ministry, there was no relationship between the state of siege and the measures provided by the decree, given that the state of siege only allowed for measures to maintain, not change the institutional order. The legality of non-binding votes was also questioned. The Supreme Court, through sentence 59 of May 24, 1990, ruled the decree to be constitutional. Arguing that the country's political institutions had lost their effectiveness and become unsuitable in the face of greater violence, their 'redesign' was clearly necessary. The court argued that constitutional judges must take heed of the social reality, and made several references to the popular movement in favour of constitutional reform. In the Supreme Court's opinion, the decree did not entail any constitutional reform, plebiscite or referendum - it merely gave the 'legal possibility' for counting votes on the possibility of convening a constitutional assembly. Therefore, the judges could not comment on the possibility of convening a constitutional assembly, and wrote that claims that the decree violated article 218 were based on false assumptions on the real scope of the decree.

The vote went ahead on May 27, and the affirmative option in favour of a constitutional assembly carried over 95% of the votes cast, although only 43% of voters participated.

=== Decree 1926 ===
Liberal candidate César Gaviria was elected president on the same day as the vote on the constitutional assembly was held. Gaviria had served as interior minister in Barco's government, actively involved in constitutional affairs. Although Colombian voters - those who participated - had overwhelmingly voted in favour of a constitutional assembly in an officially sanctioned vote, there was no agreement on the form that constitutional change should take. Large number of politicians from both major parties preferred to see constitutional reform done through Congress rather than a constituent assembly, while more marginal political and social forces pushed for a constituent rather than constitutional assembly.

Gaviria undertook dialogues with the major political parties and their leaders. In July 1990, Gaviria sent his draft proposal for a constitutional assembly to the largest political parties. His proposal planned for a small assembly, a rigid predetermined agenda and with guerrilla participation limited to those groups who had demobilized. (Note: Gaviria's July 20 proposal was for a 50-member assembly, with 9 of those members appointed by the government, working with an agenda set by the government. There had been no popular input in the design of the agenda, and the President's plan allowed for very little grassroots participation. Only university graduates with 5 years experience in their field would be eligible for election.) Gaviria's draft was rejected by the guerrilla groups, smaller legal left-wing parties, the umbrella organization of pro-constituent assembly movements and even Todavía podemos salvar a Colombia. Pro-constituent assembly groups instead proposed a constituent assembly to write a new constitution, with extensive grassroots and guerrilla participation.

On August 2, 1990, Gaviria oversaw the signing of a political agreement for a constitutional assembly by members of the Liberal Party, the two rival Conservative groups and the AD M-19. This agreement was the basis for Decree 1926, issued on August 24 and calling for a referendum on the creation of a constitutional assembly on the basis of the political agreement and simultaneous elections to the constitutional assembly. Like decree 927, decree 1926 was issued as a state of siege decree under article 121 of the 1886 constitution, and justified the creation of a constitutional assembly with the need to solve the country's conflicts by reforming the country's institutions. As per the agreement/decree, the referendum for and parallel election of a constitutional assembly would be held on December 9, 1990, and the assembly would convene a period of 150 days beginning on February 5, 1991. The assembly would be composed of 70 members elected in a single multi-member national constituency, with a minimum of two additional seats reserved for non-voting delegates from demobilized guerrilla groups. Only citizens who had held high political office, had been university professors for at least three years or had worked in a field with a university degree for at least five years were eligible for election, although the decree created exceptions for those who had been undergraduate students for at least one year, indigenous leaders for at least one year, social leaders for at least one year or those who had received a pardon as part of a peace process.

The agreement/decree set an agenda to which the assembly would be limited. On the basis of the agenda, preparatory commissions made up of experts, social and political leaders would hold debates and public hearings. An advisory commission to the presidency, with six members appointed by the president, would be tasked with drawing up the final draft and submitting it to the assembly. The agreement gave the government the initiative for presenting projects to the deliberation of the assembly, although 10 members of Congress would also be allowed to present their projects. The list of topics on the agenda included reforms to Congress, the legislative process, the judiciary, public prosecutions, public administration, human rights, local government, the status of political parties, popular participation, the state of siege and economic matters.

While former President Carlos Lleras Restrepo and El Tiempo praised the agreement, it was criticized by the director of El Espectador who denounced the heavy participation of Congress in the future assembly and the limited room for citizens' input. Others - such as the pro-constituent assembly groups on the left - blasted the fairly rigid eligibility conditions and the exclusion of students, guerrillas, social leaders and indigenous peoples. These left-wing groups organized demonstrations for a "people's constituent assembly" on September 6. The FARC, who claimed to support a dialogue with the government, contended that the government's constitutional assembly would merely serve to pass reforms which had failed in Congress and reiterated their demands for an "autonomous and sovereign constituent assembly" which would draft a new constitution. Demobilized groups such as the PRT, MAQL and some fronts of the EPL cautiously welcomed some aspects of the decree but sought modifications in certain areas.

=== Ruling 138 of the Supreme Court of Justice ===
Decree 1926 was brought to the Supreme Court by several plaintiffs. The decree's advocates argued that it pertained to the organization of an electoral event and claimed that the Nation, the source of sovereignty under article 2 of the 1886 constitution, could exercise its constituent power notwithstanding articles 218 and 13. Critics of the decree, the court's record stated, hit it from several angles - those who claimed the anticipated reforms were elitist and limited in scope; (Note: The court's decision listed three of the main criticisms of the decree it heard - the insufficient number of delegates to the assembly, the alleged undemocratic and exclusionary composition of the assembly and the limitations established by the agenda.) and those who claimed that the decree was unconstitutional as it violated articles 218 and 13 (they also rejected preeminence could be established between articles 2 and 218). As with decree 927, the public ministry opined that the court should either inhibit itself from ruling on the decree (as it was a 'political act') or rule it unconstitutional.

On October 9, in sentence number 138, the Supreme Court of Justice narrowly ruled decree 1926 to be constitutional with specific exceptions. The ruling created deeper divisions between the judges than their May ruling on decree 927, ultimately being approved with 15 votes in favour and 12 dissents (salvamentos de voto). The court found that the decree, taken in its entirety, had sufficient connections to the state of siege, for reasons similar to those presented in its May 24 ruling on decree 927.

Considering article 218, the majority opined that the judge needed to consider the social reality (an argument already made in their May ruling), specifically looking to societal values and reflecting on the usefulness of legal norms to certain purposes deemed valuable to the society. The court made reference to peace, a value explicitly mentioned in the preamble of the 1886 constitution. In summary, the court declared that it was insufficient to consider only article 218 (and 13) in ruling on decree 1926's constitutionality:

Así pues, tanto por razones filosóficas como jurisprudenciales, para definir si el Decreto 1926 de 24 de agosto de 1990 es constitucional no basta compararlo con los artículos 218 de la Constitución y 13 del plebiscito del 1° de diciembre de 1957 si no tener en cuenta su virtualidad para alcanzar la paz. Aunque es imposible asegurar que el mencionado decreto llevara necesariamente a la anhelada paz, no puede la Corte cerrar esa posibilidad.
Therefore, both for philosophic and jurisprudential reasons, to determine whether Decree 1926 of August 24, 1990 is constitutional, it is insufficient to compare it with the articles 218 of the Constitution and 13 of the plebiscite of December 1, 1957 without taking into account its potential for peace. Although it is impossible to ensure that the mentioned decree would necessarily lead to the desired peace, the Court cannot close this possibility.

Among its other considerations, the court emphasized the notions of sovereignty, popular sovereignty and the idea of the 'primary constituent' (constituyente primario), that is to say the Colombian nation (or people). The court's ruling declared that the 'primary constituent' can, at any time, give itself a new constitution without being subject to the requirements imposed by the constitution in force until then. It cited as precedent the modification of the 1886 constitution by plebiscite in 1957, or the adoption of the very constitution of 1886 through other means than those set by the Colombian Constitution of 1863. The judgement also referenced prior constitutional jurisprudence. Firstly, it mentioned a 1957 ruling on that year's plebiscite which said that the power to modify the constitution did not stem from the constitution itself but rather from 'the revolution' or the "exercise of the latent sovereignty in the people as constituent will.". (Note: In its November 28, 1957 ruling on the constitutionality of the two decrees amending the constitution through the 1957 plebiscite, the Supreme Court found itself incompetent to rule on the constitutionality of constitutional amendments (a position which the Court held in successive rulings of similar nature until 1978).) Secondly, it looked at a 1987 ruling, also concerning the constitutionality of the 1957 plebiscite, in which it had declared that "when the people, exercising its sovereign and inalienable power, decides to pronounce itself on the constitutional text that will govern their destiny, it is not and cannot be subject to the legal regulations which precede its decision." The 1987 decision had also called the 'primary constituent act' "the expression of the highest political will", free from any judicial limitations. Summarizing its opinion, the majority wrote:

En pocas pero trascendentes palabras, el Poder Constituyente Primario, representa una potencia moral y política de última instancia, capaz, aun en las horas de mayor tiniebla, de fijar el curso histórico del Estado, insurgiendo como tal con toda su esencia y vigor creativos. Por esto mismo, sabe abrir canales obstruidos de expresión, o establecer los que le han sido negados, o, en fin, convertir en eficaz un sistema inidoneo que, por factores diversos, ha llegado a perder vitalidad y aceptación.
In few but transcending words, the primary constituent power represents a moral and political power of ultimate resort, capable, even in times of the greatest darkness, of setting the historical course of the State, rebelling with all its essence and creative vigour. For this reason, it knows how to open blocked channels of expression, or establish those that had been denied, or, in the end, make efficient a system, which, for various reasons, had come to lose vitality and acceptance.

Based on these arguments, the court ruled that the agenda set by the political agreement was unconstitutional as it placed undue limits on the powers of the primary constituent. The court's sentence removed, from the December 9 referendum question, any reference to limits imposed on the assembly by the August 1990 political agreement. It also struck down a requirement for a deposit of COL$ 5,000,000 from candidates.

=== Constitutional Assembly ===
Elections to the Constitutional Assembly were held on December 9, simultaneously with the referendum authorizing the convening of said assembly for February 5, 1991. The elections were overshadowed by the massive abstention - of the country's 14,237,110 eligible voter, just 26% of them (or some 3.7 million) turned out. The referendum was carried with an overwhelming majority, with nearly 98% in favour of convening the assembly.

116 lists or candidates ran for 70 seats in the constitutional assembly. The Liberal Party alone accounted for 49 of these lists, having decided to run several separate lists - unlike the other parties - to take advantage of electoral rules. Voters cast their votes for a single/list candidate, with the seats then attributed using the electoral quotient and largest remainders. The single most popular list was that of the AD M-19, led by Antonio Navarro Wolff, which won 992,613 votes and 19 seats. The list led by Álvaro Gómez Hurtado of the National Salvation Movement won 574,411 votes and elected 11 members. Misael Pastrana Borrero's list for the Social Conservative Party won 236,794 votes and 5 seats. Overall, however, the Liberal Party elected the most members, at 25, with over 31% of the popular vote. The most successful of the various Liberal lists was led by Horacio Serpa and won 138,662 and 3 seats. The government appointed four non-voting members from demobilized guerrilla groups - two from the EPL, and one apiece from the PRT and MAQL.

During the assembly, the MSN and AD M-19 demanded that the Congress elected in March 1990 be recalled and that a new Congress be elected in 1991 following the approval of the new constitution. In a compromise between the three main forces in the assembly mediated by Gaviria and former president Alfonso López Michelsen, it was agreed that the 1990 Congress would be dismissed and new elections to Congress would be held under the rules of the new constitution in October 1991, but the members of the constitutional assembly would be ineligible to run in these elections.

The three presidents of the assembly were Alvaro Gómez Hurtado (MSN), Horacio Serpa (Liberal) and Antonio Navarro Wolff (AD M-19). The 1991 Constitution of Colombia was promulgated on July 7, 1991.

== Main changes ==
- Colombia took the shape of a decentralized unitary state with a certain autonomy for its territorial entities and a presidential system. The four-year presidential term was retained.
- An accusatory judicial system was established by the Attorney General of Colombia (Fiscalía General de la Nación).
- The power of judicial review was transferred from the Supreme Court of Justice, which had exercised it since 1910, to an independent Constitutional Court. The new body hears challenges to the constitutionality of laws, legislative decrees, laws approving international treaties, and referendum or assembly constituency summons and hears appeals of lower judicial decisions related to the tutelage action of constitutional rights.
- The tutelage action was instituted as a quick and effective mechanism that allows citizens to assert their fundamental rights as stated in Article 8 of the Universal Declaration of Human Rights of 1948.
- The extradition of Colombian citizens was banned until the article was repealed in 1996.
- Presidential reelection was banned completely, with an immediate re-election already forbidden in the Constitution of 1886. However, the rule was repealed in 2004 by using procedures that were declared valid by the Constitutional Court on October 19, 2005. In 2015, the Congress approved the repeal of a 2004 constitutional amendment that eliminated the one-term limit for presidents.

== Title I: Fundamental principles ==
In Article 1, Colombia is defined as a "social state under the rule of law", or estado social de derecho, organized as a "decentralized unitary republic, with autonomy of its territorial units." It cites other fundamental principles defining the Colombian State - democratic; participatory; pluralistic; based on the respect of human dignity, on the work and solidarity of the individuals who belong to it, and the prevalence of the general interest.

=== The Estado social de derecho ===
The definition of Colombia as a "social state under the rule of law", or estado social de derecho in Spanish, is one of the most important legal and philosophical changes associated with the 1991 constitution. The concept combines two common doctrines in continental European legal thinking - that of the Rechtsstaat (state of law or rule of law, known as estado de Derecho in Spanish), borrowed from German jurisprudence; and that of the "social state" (estado social), similar to the related concept of the Welfare state. The Colombian Constitution of 1991 was inspired by the Basic Law for the Federal Republic of Germany, which in its article 20 proclaims Germany to be a "democratic and social federal state" (demokratischer und sozialer Bundesstaat) and the Spanish Constitution of 1978 which established Spain as a "social and democratic State, subject to the rule of law" (Estado social y democrático de Derecho).

The Rechtsstaat or estado de derecho refers to a State in which the exercise of political power is constrained by the law, and where the law is also just. The most important principles underpinning this doctrine are the supremacy of a written constitution, a separation of powers with all branches bound by laws, a hierarchy of laws, the guarantee of individual fundamental rights, legal certainty and the proportionality of state action. The social state denotes those who have incorporated, within their legal system and constitutional order, social rights (or second-generation rights). These rights commonly include the right to work, social security, the right to education, the right to health. The first constitution to explicitly establish social rights was the 1919 Weimar Constitution of Germany, followed by the Spanish Constitution of 1931 and, in Colombia, the 1936 constitutional reform of President Alfonso López Pumarejo.

Colombian legal scholar Luis Villar Borda identified German legal scholar and philosopher Hermann Heller as the creator of the concept of the estado social de derecho, formulated in the 1930s in the face of the perceived limitations of the Rechtsstaat to make the principle of equality a reality. The new definition of the Colombian State meant that the State transcended its traditional role as an administrator to serve and guarantee the country's development.

The Colombian constitution, under its second title, lists a large variety of civil and political rights and economic, social and cultural rights, and establishes judicial mechanisms to guarantee them.

In sentence T-406/92, the Constitutional Court noted that the concept of the estado social de derecho encompassed not only individual rights but also the entire organizational apparatus of the State. It further added that the 'organic part' of the constitution (that establishing the organization of the State's political institutions) only acquired meaning and rationale as the implementation and application of the rights and principles enshrined in its 'dogmatic part'.

=== Other fundamental principles ===
Article 2 lists the essential goals of the State: "serve the community, promote the general welfare, guaranteeing the effectiveness of the principles, rights, and duties stipulated by the Constitution;" facilitating popular participation in decisions of national importance, defending national independence, maintaining territorial integrity, and ensure peaceful coexistence and enforcement of a just order. The article also stipulates that the authorities of the State are established in order to protect all residents of Colombia and to ensure the fulfillment of the social duties of the State and individuals.

According to Article 3, "Sovereignty resides exclusively in the people, from whom public power emanates." They exercise it directly or through their representatives. The forms of democratic participation are presented in title four of the Constitution, from article 103 onwards. In the 1886 constitution, sovereignty was said to reside "essentially and exclusively" in the Nation.

Article 4 establishes the Constitution as the supreme law of the country, the supremacy of the Constitution in case of incompatibility with any law and citizens' and resident foreigners' obligation to abide by the Constitution and the laws. According to Article 6, each person is individually responsible before the authorities for violations of the Constitution and the laws, with civil servants further responsible for omission and abuse in the exercise of their duties.

The fifth article establishes the primacy of the inalienable rights of the individual, without any discrimination, and protects the family as the basic institution of society.

Article 7 recognizes and protects the ethnic and cultural diversity of Colombia, while the following article obliges the State and individuals to protect the cultural and natural assets of the country. The 1991 constitution was a major break with the unitary and exclusionary view of the Nation which had existed in Colombia until that time. The Colombian nation, like most other Hispanoamerican countries, had hitherto been defined in exclusionary terms as a Catholic, Hispanic and Spanish-speaking nation to the exclusion of indigenous peoples and racial minority groups. The 1991 constitution therefore recognized the multiethnic and multicultural composition of Colombia, and allowed Colombia's indigenous, Afro-Colombian and Raizal minorities - among others - to gain political, legal and cultural visibility and recognition.

Article 9 sets the principles which should guide the foreign relations - National sovereignty, respect for the self-determination of peoples and the recognition of the principles of international law approved by Colombia. It also states that Colombian foreign policy is oriented towards Latin American and Caribbean integration.

Castilian Spanish is the official language of Colombia, (Note: The official Spanish text of the constitution explicitly says castellano (Castilian) rather than español (Spanish).) as per article 10, but the constitution also recognizes the co-officiality of the languages and dialects of ethnic groups in their territories and provides for bilingual education in communities with their own linguistic traditions.

Besides the estado social de derecho, the 1991 constitution introduced several significant changes to the country's political system and political culture, such as decentralization, participatory democracy, forms of limited direct democracy, recognition of ethnocultural diversity and a much wider scope of basic rights.

== Title II: Rights, guarantees and duties ==
=== Chapter I: Fundamental rights ===
Articles 11 through 41 of the Constitution list the fundamental rights. These rights are:

- Right to life, with capital punishment expressly prohibited (Article 11). Capital punishment had been abolished in Colombia in 1910 through a constitutional amendment. The Constitutional Court has ruled that the right to life is not absolute. In sentence C-355/06, the Court's opinion said that "despite its constitutional relevance, life does not have the character of a value or an absolute right and must be weighed with the other values, principles and constitutional rights." Two of the notable exceptions to the right to life ruled constitutional by the Constitutional Court are assisted suicide (decriminalized by sentence C-239/97) and abortion in case of danger to the mother's life, life-threatening fetal defects, rape, incest or non-consensual fertilization (sentence C-355/06) or at woman or pregnant person choice until week 24 of gestational term (sentence C-055/22).
  - Concerning assisted suicide, in 1997, the Court's opinion was that the State's duty to protect life must be compatible with respect for human dignity and the free development of personality (article 16), and that in the case of terminally ill patients, this duty must give way to the informed consent of patients who wish to die with dignity. In the same case, the Court affirmed that "the right to life cannot be reduced to mere subsistence, but rather involves living adequately in dignity." In the same vein, the State cannot force an unwilling person suffering from major pain to prolonge his/her existence for a short period of time, and doing so would constitute cruel and inhumane treatment, which is banned by the Constitution (article 12). In the case of abortion, the Court argued that the basis for the prohibition of abortion in other cases was based on the State's duty to protect the life of the unborn rather than the status of the unborn as a human being entitled to the right to life.
- Not to be subjected to forced disappearance, torture, cruel, inhuman or degrading treatment or punishment (Article 12). Slavery, servitude and the slave trade in all forms are prohibited by Article 17.
- Individuals are born free and equal under the law, and shall receive equal protection and treatment from the authorities, and shall enjoy the same rights, freedoms, and opportunities. Discrimination on the grounds of gender, race, national or familial origin, language, religion, political opinion, or philosophy is explicitly banned (Article 13). The State, according to the Constitution, promotes the conditions so that "equality may be real and effective" and adopts measures in favour of marginalized or discriminated groups. Furthermore, the State has special responsibility to protect individuals who are in "clearly vulnerable circumstances" on account of their economic, physical, or mental condition, and to punish abuses or ill-treatment against them. The Constitutional Court has established an equality test to evaluate when discrimination against an enunciated group may be justified: namely, if the act fostering a differential treatment has a permissible and imperative constitutional purpose, if the act is useful and necessary to achieve its intended purpose and if the act maintains proportionality between the benefit obtained and any damages or prejudice caused on other subjects.
- Right to a legal identity (Article 14).
- Right to personal and familial privacy and to one's good reputation. Furthermore, natural and judicial persons have the right to know, update and rectify information collected about them by public and private entities in their records and databases - the constitutional foundation of Habeas data (Article 15).
- Correspondence and other private communications may not be violated. They may only be intercepted or recorded on the basis of a court order, according to terms set by the law. For tax and legal purposes, authorities may demand making available accounting records and other private documents within the limits set by law, only for purposes of inspection, oversight and governmental intervention (Article 15).
- Free development of personality, without limitations other than those imposed by the rights of others and the legal order (Article 16). This is a broad right to individual autonomy and general freedom of action according to one's own beliefs, limited only by the rights of others and the law. Along with the right to a legal identity (personalidad), the Constitutional Court in 1996 found that homosexuality was a valid and legitimate personal orientation.
- Freedom of conscience (Article 18) and freedom of religion (Article 19). The 1991 Constitution removed all references to the Catholic Church, which had been the country's official religion between 1886 and 1936 and was referenced in the former constitution until its repeal in 1991. The 1991 Constitution further declared all faiths and churches equally free before the law.
- Freedom of expression, freedom of the press, right to transmit and receive truthful and impartial information and the right to establish mass communications media. Censorship is banned (Article 20).
- Right to honour, meant in the sense of protecting the esteem and respect a person acquires from others because of virtues and merits. It forms the constitutional basis of for slander and libel cases (Article 21).
- Peace as a right and mandatory duty, understood as the right to live in a society in which conflicts are resolved peacefully (Article 22).
- Right to petition public authorities (Article 23). Article 74 restates the right to access public documents, and adds that confidentiality is inviolable.
- Freedom of movement and residence for Colombian citizens, subject only to the limitations established by statute (Article 24)
- Work as a right and social obligation, protected in all its forms by the State. Every individual is entitled to a job under dignified and equitable conditions (Article 25).
- Freedom of profession or occupation (Article 26). The law may require certificates of competence, and the competent authorities inspect and oversee the exercise of professions.
- Legally recognized professions may be organized into professional associations, whose internal structures and operations are democratic (Article 26).
- Academic freedom - freedom of teaching, research and professorship (Article 27).
- Right to asylum (Article 36).
- Freedom of assembly and right to protest peacefully (Article 37).
- Freedom of association (Article 38).
- Workers and employers have the right to form trade unions without interference by the State. Trade union representatives are provided jurisdiction and other necessary guarantees (Article 39).
- Political rights are listed in Article 40. The expansion of political participation to create a more participatory democracy was one of the major aims of the 1991 Constitution. These rights are:
  1. Right to vote and be elected
  2. Participate in elections, plebiscites, referendums, popular consultations and other forms of political participation
  3. To form political parties, movements and groups without any limits whatsoever; and the right to freely participate in them and spread their ideas and programs.
  4. Recall elected officials where applicable
  5. Right to take initiative in public bodies
  6. Undertake legal actions in defence of the constitution and the law
  7. Hold public office, except for Colombians by birth or naturalization holding dual-citizenship
  - The authorities guarantee the adequate and effective participation of women in public administration.

==== Legal rights ====
- Every individual is free and no one may be importuned in his/her person or family, arrested, jailed or have his/her property search except on the basis of a written court order (Article 28).
- A person in preventive detention shall be placed at the disposition of a competent judge within 36 hours (Article 28). This right is closely connected with habeas corpus rights in Article 30, which also sets a 36-hour time period.
- No arrest, detention or imprisonment for debts (Article 28).
- Due process in all judicial and administrative matters (Article 29). This right stipulates:
  - No one may be judged except in accordance with previously written laws (nullum crimen sine lege)
  - Right to lesser punishment
  - Presumption of innocence until proven guilty
  - Assistance by counsel picked by the accused or appointed
  - Right to a public trial without unreasonable delay
  - Right to present and refute evidence
  - Right not to be tried again (double jeopardy)
  - Evidence obtained in violation of due process is null and void by right
- Right to appeal. When the accused is the sole appelant, the court may not impose a heavier penalty (Article 31).
- A person caught In flagrante delicto may be apprehended and brought to a judge by any individual. Should the offender be subject to hot pursuit by law enforcement officials and takes refuge in his/her own home, the officials may enter the domicile to apprehend the accused. If the offender should be caught in someone else's home, a request from the resident shall be sought beforehand (Article 32).
- Right against self-incrimination (Article 33).
- Exile, life imprisonment and confiscation are banned. Nevertheless, by court sentence, property ownership may be nullified if it is injurious to the public treasury or seriously harmful to social morality (Article 34).
- Extradition may be requested, granted or offered in accordance with treaties or a relevant statute. Extradition is not granted for political crimes (Article 35). The 1991 Constituent Assembly, influenced by the demands of Colombian drug traffickers such as Pablo Escobar, had banned extradition of native-born Colombians. Following the adoption of article 35 by the Constituent Assembly in June 1991, Pablo Escobar voluntarily turned himself in. Extradition was reestablished by a constitutional amendment in 1997.

=== Chapter II: Social, economic and cultural rights ===
The 1991 Constitution guarantees a wide range of social, economic and cultural rights as part of the definition of Colombia as a "social state under the rule of law" (estado social de derecho). These rights are listed in articles 42 through 77, and include:

- Family as the basic nucleus of society, "formed on the basis of natural or legal ties, through the free decision of a man and woman to contract matrimony or through the responsible resolve to comply with it." The State and society guarantee the integral protection of the family, and the family's honour, dignity and privacy are inviolable. According to the third paragraph of article 42, "family relations are based on the equality of rights and duties of the couple and on the reciprocal respect of all its members. Any form of violence in the family is considered destructive of its harmony and unity." The fourth paragraph recognizes the equal rights and duties of all children, whether they be born within or outside of marriage or adopted. Couples have the right to decide "freely and responsibly" the number of their children, and are constitutionally responsible to support and educate them while they are minors or not self-supporting. The regulation of marriage, separation and divorce are determined by the State (Article 42).
  - In accordance with the 1991 Constitution's pluralist spirit, this article protects different forms of families, including those outside of wedlock forming legally recognized marital unions, distinct from marriage but sharing the "essential characteristic" of being institutions which create families. Similarly, constitutional jurisprudence has highlighted the 'flexible character' of the family, whereby an individual partakes in several different forms of familial relationships during his/her lifetime. Faced with the issue of same-sex marriage, in sentence C-577 in July 2011, the Constitutional Court found that same sex couples are a recognized form of family that may be originated by natural ties (De Facto Unions) or by legal ties (a Solemn Contract), as there were no legal contract that same sex couples could opt, the National Congress was invoked to correct the "deficit of protection" and was exhorted to legislate on the matter of same-sex relationships. C-577 sentence included a deadline, if Congress would not correct the deficit by June 2013, then same sex couples would be able to opt for a Legal Tie before Judges and notars. Deadline was not met, and by analogy, many Judges married same-sex couples, in sentence SU-214 of April 2016 Constitutional Court ruled that the Legal Tie that corrects the deficit of protection is Marriage and that all judges and notars are obliged to perform that ceremony under the same conditions required for opposite couples.
- Women and men have equal rights and opportunities, and women cannot be subjected to any type of discrimination (Article 43). Furthermore, the State must provide special assistance and protection to women during pregnancy and after delivery, including food subsidies if the woman should find herself unemployed or abandoned.
- Children's rights (Article 44) - explicitly listed are life, physical integrity, health and social security, a balanced diet, their name and citizenship, to have a family and not be separated from it, care and love, instruction and culture, recreation, and the free expression of their opinions. Children are to be protected against all forms of abandonment, physical or moral violence, economic exploitation, dangerous work and sexual abuse. Families, society and the State must assist and protect children. Adolescents are entitled to protection and integral development by Article 45. In a landmark decision in November 2015, the Constitutional Court ruled that excluding same-sex parents from the universe of potential adopters was a limitation of the right of children to have a family and not be separated from it.
- A commitment to elder rights by the State, society and families (Article 46). The State must provide them with full social security and food subsidies in the case of indigence.
- The State shall promote a policy of planning, rehabilitation and social integration for those who are physically, emotionally or psychologically handicapped (Article 47).
- Social security is a mandatory public service which shall be delivered under the administration, coordination, and control of the State subject to the principles of efficiency, universality, and solidarity (Article 48). Colombia's social security system is regulated by Law 100 of 1993.
- Healthcare and sanitation are public services under the responsibility of the State, and all persons are guaranteed access to services that promote, protect and restore health (Article 49).
- Right to housing and to live in dignity (Article 51).
- Right to recreation, the practice of sports and the enjoyment of free time (Article 52).
- Labour law is passed by Congress, but must take into fundamental principles including equality of opportunity for workers, remuneration proportional to the amount and quality of work, employment stability, the irrevocability of minimum benefits established in labour regulations, collective bargaining, the right to social security, training, instruction, necessary rest and the special protection of women, mothers and minors (Article 53). Nevertheless, labour rights protected by this article have yet to be regulated by law.
- Employers and the State must offer training and qualification (Article 54).
- Right to collective bargaining (Article 55).
- Right to strike save for essential public services (Article 56). A commission made up of the government, representatives of employers and workers promotes sound labour relations, contributes to the settlement of labour disputes and coordinates wage and labour policies.
- Property rights are guaranteed, but are not absolute, because property has a social and environment role which implies obligations (Article 58). In case of conflict between individual property rights and a law enacted for reasons of public utility or social interest, the public or social interest prevails. There may be Expropriation for reasons of public utility or social interest, subject to judicial authorization and prior compensation. A 1999 constitutional amendment removed the possibility for expropriation without compensation. As a result, expropriation without prior compensation is only constitutional in case of war (Article 59). Complementing property rights, article 60 enshrines the State's duty to promote access to individual or collective property.
- Property in public use, national parks, communal lands of ethnic communities, Native reserves (resguardos) and the nation's archaeological heritage are inalienable, imprescriptible and not subject to seizure (Article 63).
- Protection of intellectual property (Article 61).
- Right to education, mandatory between the ages of 5 and 15 and including at least one year of preschool and nine years of basic education (Article 67). Public education is free, although school fees may be paid by those who can afford them. The State inspects and supervises education. The article also lists the main values guiding the education system; namely human rights, peace, and democracy, and the practice of work and recreation for cultural, scientific, and technological improvement and for environmental protection. The article is complemented by articles 68 and 69. Article 68 allows individuals to create educational institutions, allows parents to choose the type of education for their children, guarantees ethnic communities an education which respect and develops their cultural identity, ensures that education is placed in the hands of people with "recognized ethical and pedagogical suitability" and establishes eradication of illiteracy and the education of individuals with physical or mental limitations or exceptional capabilities as special obligations of the State. Article 69 protects the autonomy of universities.
- The State has the duty to promote and encourage access to culture for all Colombians equally (Article 70). Culture, in its diverse forms, is said to be "the basis of nationality." The nation's cultural and archaeological heritage belong to the nation and are protected by the State; ethnic groups, nevertheless, may enjoy special rights when they occupy territories of archaeological importance (Article 72).
- Artistic freedom (Article 71).
- Journalism is protected to guarantee its freedom and professional independence (Article 73).
- Articles 75 through 77 address the electromagnetic spectrum (i.e. radio and television), which is an inalienable and imprescriptible public resource managed and controlled by the State (Article 75), which may intervene to avoid monopolistic practices in its uses.

=== Chapter III: Collective and environmental rights ===
Beyond first and second generation rights protected in the above chapters, the 1991 Constitution codified rights belonging to a new third generation of human rights, including environmental protection. Because of the new collective and environmental rights enshrined in this chapter, the 1991 Constitution has been called a "green constitution". These rights are:

- Consumer rights (Article 78).
- Right to a healthy environment (Article 79) and the State's duty for sustainable development and controlling environmental degradation (Article 80).
- The manufacture, importation, possession and use of chemical, biological and nuclear weapons are banned, as is the introduction of nuclear and toxic waste into Colombian territory (Article 81).
- State's duty to protect the integrity of public space, and its use in the common interest. Resolution 541 of 1994 issued by the Ministry of the Environment defines 'public space' as public or private buildings or natural/architectural elements associated to them who are intended by their nature or use to the satisfaction of collective needs.

Additionally, the final article of the second title under the fourth chapter (Article 94), clarifies that the enunciation of the rights and guarantees contained in the Constitution and in international agreements do not exclude others not expressly mentioned.

=== Chapter IV: Protection and application of rights ===
The fourth section of the fourth section establish the mechanisms through which citizens may protect their rights.

==== Acción de tutela ====
Perhaps the single most important innovation in the 1991 Constitution is the introduction of the acción de tutela, or 'tutelage action', a legal remedy comparable to the recurso de amparo in other Spanish-speaking countries. It is established by Article 86 of the Constitution, which states that "Every individual may claim legal protection before the judge, at any time or place, through a preferential and summary proceeding, for himself/herself or by whoever acts in his/her name, the immediate protection of his/her fundamental constitutional rights when the individual fears the latter may be jeopardized or threatened by the action or omission of any public authority." The protection granted by the courts consists of an order enjoining others to act or refrain from acting, which may be challenged before a competent judge who shall transmit it to the Constitutional Court for possible revision. The Constitution established it as a mechanism of last recourse, when the individual has no other means of legal defence, except when it is used as a transitional mechanism to avoid irreparable harm, but it has become one of the most widely used rights protection mechanism in Colombia, likely because it guarantees speedy resolution - within 10 days, according to Article 86.

The acción de tutela is used to ensure the immediate protection of fundamental rights, but the Constitutional Court has ruled that "the fundamental character of a right can only be determined in each (individual) case", which means that the rights protected are not limited to those listed in Chapter I of the second title and requiring each judge to analyse each case to determine if it can be protected by an acción de tutela.

Decree 2591 of 1991 regulates the acción de tutela. One of the aspects which makes it so popular with citizens is its simplicity and informality - any natural or juridical person may file an application which requires the action or omission which motivated it, the right considered violated or threatened, the name of the public authority responsible for the grievance and the description of other relevant circumstances, along with the name and residence of the applicant. It is not required to cite the specific constitutional rule infringed, and the application may be made through any written form of communication, with a possibility for minors and the illiterate to apply orally. In cases where the request concerns an authority, the judge's decision shall ensure to the aggrieved the full enjoyment of their right and return to the state prior to the violation (if possible). In cases where the request concerns the denial of an act or omission, the judge shall order that the adequate action be taken within 48 hours. Finally, in cases of a conduct, threat or behaviour, the ruling shall order its immediate cessation and prevent any new threat.

A 2013 poll of 5,866 people showed that the acción de tutela was the most well-known judicial mechanism, with 83.7% of respondents being familiar with it, compared to between 20 and 25% of respondents who were familiar with the four other rights-protection mechanisms. Furthermore, the study reported that 65% had a favourable opinion of the mechanism against only 11% who viewed it unfavourably. On the occasion of the 20th anniversary of the Constitution in 2011, Semana confirmed that the acción de tutela was the most widely used judicial mechanism, with 4 million actions submitted across Colombia between 1991 and 2011. In 2013 alone, there were 454,500 actions brought forward, with the most commonly invoked rights being the right to petition (48%), right to health (23%), other economic and social rights (15%), human dignity (14%) and social security (11%). In 69% of cases, the ruling favoured the citizen. However, the wide use of the recourse has led to major backlogs. In 2010, a commission of experts convened by the government for its judicial reform noted that the use of the action had "aggravated the breach of procedural terms, delays and backlogs in the processing of the ordinary cases."

==== Compliance action ====
Article 87 establishes the acción de cumplimiento or compliance action, whereby any individual may demand from the administrative jurisdiction the effective application of a law or administrative decision, although not a constitutional norm. The legal requirement (established by Law 393 of 1997) that the law or decision challenged must not entail public spending has weakened the application of this legal recourse.

==== Popular actions and class or group actions ====
Article 88 establishes acciones populares or popular actions, for the protection of collective rights and interests related to property, space, public safety and health, administrative morality, the environment, free economic competition and other areas of similar nature. The article also refers to a similar mechanism - class or group actions - for actions which harmed a group of individuals (20 or more). Its purpose is remedial and may allow for compensation.

Article 90 forces the State to answer materially for any extralegal damages for which it is responsible, caused by the acts or omissions of public authorities.

==== Constitutional bloc ====
The bloque de constitucionalidad or constitutional/constitutionality bloc, established by Article 93, is made up of all international human rights treaties and agreements ratified by Congress. These treaties have equal constitutional validity and the constitutional rights listed by the Constitution are interpreted in accordance with them.

=== Chapter V: Duties and Obligations ===
The fifth and final chapter of the title, made up of Article 95, lists the duties and obligations of Colombians, first and foremost the "duty to exalt and dignify" the national community and the obligation to obey the Constitution and the laws. The nine duties listed are respecting others' rights and not abusing one's own, striving in accordance with the principle of social solidarity, respecting and supporting the legitimately constituted democratic authorities, defending and propagating human rights, participating in political and civic life, working to achieve and maintain peace, collaborating for the proper functioning of the administration of justice, protecting the country's natural and cultural resources, ensuring the preservation of a healthy environment and contributing to the financing of public expenses.

== Title III: Population and Territory ==
=== Chapters I and II: Nationality and Citizenship ===
Article 96 establishes the basis of Colombian nationality law, acquired at birth or by naturalization. Colombia, unlike several other countries in the Americas, has restricted jus soli, requiring that at least one of the parents of a child born in the country be a citizen or resident at time of birth. The Constitution bans denaturalization for birthright citizens, allows dual nationality (banned under the 1886 Constitution) and permits those who have renounced their citizenship to reacquire it. Article 98 allows for the renunciation and suspension of nationality, and sets the age of majority at 18. According to Article 99, citizenship is the prior and indispensable condition for the right to vote, to be elected and to hold public office.

=== Chapter III: Foreigners ===
Article 100 grants foreigners residing in Colombia the same civil rights and guarantees as those granted to citizens, but the law may, for reasons of public order, impose special conditions on or nullify the exercise of specific civil rights by aliens. Political rights are reserved to Colombian nationals, but the law has granted some resident foreigners voting rights in local elections and referendums. (Note: Law 1070 of 2006 grants local voting rights to legally resident foreigners who have lived in Colombia for five continuous and uninterrupted years.)

=== Chapter IV: Territory ===
Territorial limits of Colombia with its neighbours, 1810-present

The territorial limits of the country are those established in international treaties and those defined by arbitration awards, and may be modified only by treaties approved by Congress and duly ratified by the President (Article 101).

== Title IV: Democratic Participation and Political Parties ==
=== Chapter I: Democratic Participation ===
The mechanisms of popular participation established in the Constitution (Article 103) are voting, referendums, plebiscites, popular consultations (consulta popular), open council meetings (cabildo abierto), popular legislative initiative and recall (direct recall) (revocatoria del mandato, lit. revocation of mandate). The various other forms of political participation allowed by the Constitution besides regular elections give the 1991 Constitution its participative character. These forms of political participation are regulated by Law 134 of 1994 and Law 1757 of 2015, although articles 104 through 106 further specify that the President with the approval of all ministers and the Senate may consult the people on matters of national importance (article 104), that governors and mayors may likewise consult voters on issues falling under their jurisdiction (article 105) and detail the different forms of political participation at a local level (article 106).

=== Chapters II and III: Political Parties and Movements, and Status of the Opposition ===
The second and third chapters of the title concerns political parties and movements, and establishes special protection for opposition parties. The right of all citizens to establish, organize and develop parties and movements as well as their freedom to join or leave them is guaranteed. Political parties and movements are democratically organized with transparency, objectivity, morality, gender equality and the duty to present and disseminate their political programs as their guiding principles.

The contents of articles 107 through 111 on political parties were significantly modified by the major political reforms adopted in 2003 and 2009. Since 2003, it is constitutionally forbidden to belong to more than one political party. The 2003 reform codified the possibility that political parties may hold binding internal or primary elections. The 2009 political reform made political parties legally responsible for any violation of rules governing their organization as well as for having endorsed candidates for public office who had been or were sentenced for ties to illegal armed groups, drug trafficking, offences against mechanisms of democratic participation or crimes against humanity. (Note: More specifically, parties are held responsible if the candidate (regardless of whether he/she was elected) was sentenced prior to the election, or if he/she was sentenced after the election while holding the office for which he/she had received the party's nomination.) In such cases, the sanctions may include fines, the repayment of public party financing up to the loss of legal recognition. Since 2009, a candidate who wishes to seek another party's nomination for the next election must resign his/her seat at least 12 months prior to the opening of nominations.

Article 108 governs the conditions for the legal recognition of political parties and movements. Legally recognized parties may run candidates for public office, although social movements or a "significant group of citizens" may also run candidates. Originally, parties and movements needed 50,000 signatures, 50,000 votes in a previous election or holding representation in Congress. In turn, parties lost recognition for failing to obtain representation in Congress or winning less than 50,000 votes. Given the large number of political parties which gained legal recognition following the adoption of the 1991 Constitution, the 2003 political reform limited legal recognition to parties which had obtained 2% of valid votes cast nationally in elections to either house of Congress. In 2009, this threshold for recognition was raised to 3% of valid votes cast.

In an effort to increase party coherence and discipline, the 2003 reform introduced rules forcing members of an elected body elected for the same party or movement to form a single caucus and act in accordance with decisions adopted by the group. Internal party by-laws may exclude matters of conscience from this requirement and adopt sanctions for failing to obey these rules, up to expulsion.

Article 109 deals with political financing. The State contributes to the financing of legally recognized parties and movements, and electoral campaigns are partially financed with public resources. The 2003 and 2009 amendments have allowed for spending limits, access to advertising and airtime for major presidential campaigns and sanctions for violations of campaign spending limits. Article 110 bans contributions from public officials.

Article 112 guarantees parties and movements declaring themselves in opposition to the government the right to freely criticize the government and formulate their own alternative policies, and for these purposes they have access to official information and documentation, access to public communications and the electromagnetic spectrum and the right to reply. The 2015 constitutional reform has created seats in elected bodies for runner-up candidates in presidential, gubernatorial and mayoral elections; specifically, the second placed candidate for president, Vice President, governor and mayor shall have the right to hold a seat in the Senate, Chamber of Representatives, departmental assembly and municipal council respectively. This rule will be applicable beginning with the 2018 presidential and congressional elections.

== Title V: Organization of the State ==
=== Chapter I: Structure of the State ===
The first chapter outlines the three branches of government - the legislative, executive and judicial, in addition to other autonomous and independent entities (Article 113). The legislative branch (Congress, made up of the Senate and Chamber of Representatives) amends the Constitutions, makes the laws and exercises political control over the executive branch and public administration. The President is head of state, head of government and supreme administrative authority; the government is made up of the President, cabinet ministers and heads of administrative departments (Article 114). The Constitutional Court, the Supreme Court of Justice, the Council of State, the Supreme Council of the Judiciary (to be replaced by the National Commission of Judicial Discipline), the Attorney General of the Nation, the tribunals and the judges administer justice, as does the Military Criminal Justice System (Article 115). In addition, Congress has specific judicial functions while a law may exceptionally assign jurisdictional functions in specific subject areas to specific administrative authorities (who may not judge offences). The Public Ministry and Comptroller General of the Republic are control institutions (Article 116). The electoral organization is made up of the National Electoral Council and the National Civil Registrar (Article 120).

=== Chapter II: Public Administration ===
The second chapter concerns public administration, appointment to public employment and the roles and duties of civil servants. Public employment must have its responsibilities legally defined and that posts to be filled figure in the respective employment plan and that the salaries are provided in the corresponding budget (Article 122). Public servants must swear an oath to defend and abide by the Constitution, fulfill the duties of employment and declare his/her income and earnings. 2004 and 2009 reforms ban access to public employment, elected office, electoral candidacy and participation in contracts with the State to anyone sentenced for crimes involving the State treasury, membership in illegal armed groups, drug trafficking and crimes against humanity.

Article 126, significantly strengthened in 2015, establishes anti-nepotism and anti-corruption rules for appointments and the conclusion of contracts. The first paragraph bans civil servants from appointing, nominating and concluding contracts with family members; furthermore, since 2015, they are not able to appoint, nominate or sign public contracts with those persons who intervened in their appointments, and relatives of that person. The 2015 reform further modified article 126 to ban the reelection (or re-selection) to the judiciary, control institution and electoral organizations' highest offices and establish a cooling-off period banning those who have held one of these senior positions from being elected to public office or nominated to another of these senior positions within one year after the end of their term.

== Title VI: Legislative Branch ==
Title VI of the Constitution, from article 132 to 188, details the legislative branch of Colombia, which is made up of the bicameral Congress with the Senate and the Chamber of Representatives. Congress' main power is lawmaking and legislative regulation, which entails drafting, enacting, interpreting, amending and repealing laws. It also has additional powers - judicial (trying the President), elective (for senior officials of the State, notably judges), ceremonial (receiving foreign dignitaries) and political control (control of the executive).

One of the significant changes introduced by the 1991 Constitution was the election of the Senate in a single national constituency, rather than by individual department. The 1991 Constitution also democratized the legislative process, by creating possibilities for a large number of citizens or local elected officials to initiate a bill or constitutional amendment project before Congress.

== Title VII: Executive Branch ==
The seventh title of the Constitution, in articles 188 through 227, establishes the executive branch, which is led by the President of Colombia and includes the Vice President and the Council of Ministers (or cabinet).

The President is head of State, head of government and the supreme administrative authority. In these capacities, the President appoints and dismisses members of cabinet and senior bureaucrats, manages international relations, serves as Commander-in-chief of the Colombian Armed Forces, provides for the external security of Colombia, promulgates laws, exercises regulatory authority through presidential decrees, manages the public administration, ensures the collection and administration of public revenue and manages the country's economic and trade policies.

The President is directly elected to a four-year term in a two-round election. The 1991 Constitution originally limited the President to a single, non-renewable once-in-a-lifetime term, but a controversial 2004 constitutional amendment supported by then-President Álvaro Uribe permitted a President to serve two terms. This provision allowed President Uribe and his successor, Juan Manuel Santos, to successfully seek second terms in 2006 and 2014 respectively. In 2015, a constitutional amendment repealed the 2004 changes and reverted to the original one-term limit.

The 1991 Constitution made several modifications to the presidency. The President is now elected using a two-round system, whereas he had previously been elected in a single round requiring only a plurality to win. The previous constitution had barred Presidents from seeking immediate reelection, but could serve non-consecutive terms.

The Vice President is elected on a ticket with the President. The Vice President replaces the President in the event of a temporary or permanent vacancy in the office of the President. Article 194 lists permanent vacancies (faltas absolutas) as death, resignation, removal from office, permanent physical incapacity and abandoning the office; and temporary vacancies as illness or leave granted by the Senate.

The office of the Vice President was created in the 1991 Constitution. Previously, the President was followed in the order of succession by the Presidential Designate (Designado Presidencial), who was elected by Congress.

=== States of exception ===
The 1991 Constitution made significant changes to states of siege and states of emergency, known constitutionally as states of exception.

The 1886 Constitution, in article 121, allowed the President to declare a state of siege, which gave him extraordinary lawmaking powers, in the case of foreign war or internal disturbances. The duration of the state of siege was practically unlimited, with the government determining when to declare public order to be reestablished; and it could be declared throughout the country or in parts thereof. Judicial and legislative oversight of the state of siege was very limited, although a 1968 amendment imposed automatic review by the Supreme Court of all decrees adopted and the President was barred from derogating laws (only entitled to suspend laws incompatible with the state of siege during its duration) or impeding the normal functioning of Congress. Article 122 of the 1886 Constitution, modified by a 1968 amendment, allowed the President to declare a state of emergency for up to 90 days a year in the event of social or economic crises. With the Colombian armed conflict, the executive branch often used its extraordinary powers. States of siege were in place for a total of 206 months - or 17 years - between 1970 and 1991.

The 1991 Constitution replaced the state of siege with three different states of exception: state of foreign war, state of internal disturbance and the state of emergency.

==== State of foreign war ====
In the event of a foreign armed conflict, the President, with the signature of all ministers, may declare a state of foreign war (Estado de Guerra Exterior), giving the government "the powers strictly necessary to repel the aggression, defend the country's sovereignty, meet the requirements of the war, and bring about the restoration of normal conditions" (Article 212).

The declaration of a state of foreign war may be made only once the Senate has declared war, except if the President judges it necessary to repel the aggression immediately.

During the state of foreign war, the Congress continues to enjoy all its constitutional and legal powers and receives periodical reports from the presidency on the decrees adopted and the evolution of circumstances. The President may issue legislative decrees suspending laws incompatible with the state of foreign war, remaining in force until they expire and/or normal conditions are deemed to have been restored. Congress may, with a two-thirds vote of members in both houses, amend or repeal the decrees.

==== State of internal disturbance ====
In cases of serious disturbances to the public order which imminently threaten institutional stability, the security of the State or the peaceful coexistence of citizens, the President, with the signature of all ministers, may declare a state of internal disturbance (Estado de Conmoción Interior) throughout the country or part of it for a period no longer than 90 days. The state of internal disturbance may be extended for two similar periods, but the second extension requires the prior approval of the Senate (Article 213).

This article gives the powers "strictly necessary to deal with the causes of the disruption and check the spread of its effects." The legislative decrees issued by the government suspend incompatible laws and are valid until public order is declared to have been restored, although the government may extend their application for up to 90 additional days. The Constitution bans civilians from being questioned or tried under martial law.

==== State of emergency ====
In the case of events which disrupt or threaten to disrupt in serious or imminent manner the economic, social or ecological order of the country or constitute a grave public calamity, the President may declare a state of emergency for periods of up to 30 days, in periods which altogether may not exceed 90 days in the year. The government is empowered to issue legally binding decrees directed exclusively to resolving the crisis. These decrees must bear direct and specific connection to the state of emergency.

In the decree declaring a state of emergency, the government must indicate the period within which it intends to make use of its extraordinary powers, and at the conclusion thereof, Congress shall meet or be convened. Congress shall examine the government's report on the causes justifying the state of emergency and the measures adopted, and pronounce itself on their necessity and appropriateness. Congress, in the year following the state of emergency, may amend or repeal the decrees issued.

==== Judicial and legislative oversight ====
The 1991 Constitution significantly increased judicial and legislative oversight of the executive's use of states of exception (articles 212 and 213), which are subject to the following provisions:

1. All decrees must be signed by the President and countersigned by all ministers, and be directly and specifically connected to the situation for which a state of exception was declared.
2. Human and fundamental rights may not be suspended, and international humanitarian law must be respected. The measures adopted must be proportional to the gravity of the events.
3. The normal functioning of the branches of government and state institutions cannot be impeded.
4. The government will declare order to be restored and lift the state of exception as soon as the foreign war or internal disturbance has ceased.
5. The President and ministers are legally responsible if they declare states of exception without the occurrence of a foreign war or internal disturbance. They are also legally responsible for any abuse committed in exercise of their extraordinary powers.
6. The government must send the decrees issued to the Constitutional Court on the day following their promulgation for the Court to make a definite decision on their constitutionality.

=== Public force ===
The 'public force' (Fuerza Pública) is made up of the Military Forces (Army, Navy and Air Force) and the National Police. Members of the public force in active service do not have the right to vote, participate in political activities, assemble or send petitions.

Crimes committed by members of the public force in active service are tried by military tribunals and courts-martial under the Military Penal Code. In the investigation and prosecution of crimes committed during an armed conflict, the norms of international humanitarian law are to be applied.

Article 223 establishes Colombia's gun laws. Only the government may import or manufacture weapons, explosives and munitions and no one may own or carry them without the permission of the competent authority.

== Title VIII: Judicial branch ==
The eighth title of the Constitution, in articles 228 through 257, establishes the judicial branch of Colombia. The 1991 Constitution brought major changes to the organization of the judicial branch in Colombia, notably through the creation of an adversarial system with an Attorney General (Fiscal General), the creation of a constitutional court with the power of judicial review and the creation of a Superior Council of the Judiciary.

The judges of the Supreme Court of Justice and the Council of State are co-opted from lists sent by the Superior Council of the Judiciary. With the 2015 constitutional reform, the Superior Council of the Judiciary will be replaced by a Council of Judicial Government and the lists shall be sent following a public competition.

Judges of the three highest cours must be native-born citizens, lawyers with fifteen years of legal experience (in the courts, public ministry, as lawyer or professor) and have a clean criminal record. Judges of all these top courts serve non-renewable eight-year terms.

=== Chapter II: Supreme Court of Justice ===
The Supreme Court of Justice (Corte Suprema de Justicia) is the highest appellate court for the general jurisdiction. It is currently made up of a total of 23 judges, subdivided into three cassation chambers: civil and agrarian (7 judges), labour (7 judges) and criminal (9 judges) – with the presidents and vice presidents of each chamber forming a governing chamber.

The powers of the Supreme Court of Justice are:

1. Act as a court of cassation.
2. Try the President and members of the Comisión de Aforados.
3. Investigate and prosecute members of Congress.
4. Try, upon charges brought by the Attorney General or delegates thereof, the Vice President, cabinet ministers, Inspector General, Ombudsman, agents of the public ministry, directors of administrative departments, Comptroller General, ambassadors, heads of diplomatic or consular missions, governors, judges of tribunals, general and admirals for punishable acts.
5. Take cognizance of all contentious issues of accredited diplomatic personnel in cases provided by international law.
6. Other responsibilities assigned by law.

=== Chapter III: Council of State ===
The Council of State (Consejo de Estado) is the highest appellate court for administrative law. It is currently made up of a total of 31 councillors or judges, subdivided into an administrative litigation chamber (27 members) and a consultative chamber (the rest).

The powers of the Council of State are:

1. Act as the supreme administrative court.
2. Take cognizance of constitutional challenges to decrees issued by the government not under the jurisdiction of the Constitutional Court.
3. Act as the supreme consultative body for the government on administrative matters. In cases of the transit or stationing of foreign troops, vessels or aircraft in the national territory, the government must obligatorily hear the opinion of the Council of State.
4. Prepare and submit constitutional amendments and bills.
5. Hear and decide cases on congressmen's loss of mandate (investidura).
6. Since 2009, hear and decide electoral disputes.
7. Other responsibilities assigned by law.

=== Chapter IV: Constitutional Court ===
The Constitutional Court (Corte Constitucional) is the supreme court for constitutional law, created by the 1991 Constitution. It is made up of nine judges or magistrates elected by the Senate to individual non-renewable eight-year terms from lists of three names each presented by the President, the Supreme Court of Justice and the Council of State.

The Court safeguards the integrity and supremacy of the Constitution. Its powers are:

1. Deciding on petitions of unconstitutionality brought by citizens against constitutional amendments, only for procedural defects.
2. Deciding, prior to the vote, on the constitutionality of acts convening a referendum or constituent assembly, only for procedural defects.
3. Deciding on the constitutionality of referendums on laws, national consultation or national plebiscites; the latter two only for procedural defects.
4. Deciding on petitions of unconstitutionality brought by citizens against any laws, for material content or procedural defects.
5. Deciding on petitions of unconstitutionality brought by citizens against decrees with force of law, for material content or procedural defects.
6. Deciding on the excuses for the absence of any natural or juridical person called before any permanent commission of Congress.
7. Deciding on the constitutionality of decrees issued by the government during a state of exception or emergency.
8. Deciding on the constitutionality of bills objected to by the government for unconstitutionality, for material content or procedural defects.
9. Reviewing judicial decisions related to an acción de tutela. The Court selects a limited number of actions to be reviewed.
10. Deciding on the constitutionality of international treaties and laws ratifying them.
11. Since 2015, resolving jurisdictional disputes arising between different jurisdictions.

Any citizen may submit petitions of unconstitutionality (acciones públicas) and any citizen may intervene to defend or challenge a legal norm. The Inspector General (Procurador General) must render an opinion (concepto) in all cases, within 30 days.

Previously, the power of judicial review was held by the Supreme Court of Justice.

=== Chapter V: Special jurisdictions ===
The Constitution establishes special jurisdictions for the authorities of indigenous peoples within their territory in accordance with their customs and procedure as long as they are not contrary to the Constitution or the laws (Article 246). Justices of the peace may be established by law (Article 247).

=== Chapter VI: Attorney General ===
The Constitution created the office of the Attorney General of the Nation (Fiscalía General de la Nación), headed by the Attorney General. The Attorney General is elected to a single non-renewable four-year term by the Supreme Court of Justice from a list sent by the President, with the same rules of eligibility as for judges of the Supreme Court of Justice.

It is the office of the Attorney General's responsibility to investigate the facts which may constitute offenses and to press criminal charges. It may not, therefore, suspend, interrupt or drop a criminal investigation except where authorized by law. Its powers are:

1. Solicit guarantees from the appropriate judge for the appearance of the accused in court, the safeguarding of evidence and protection for the community and victims in particular.
2. Conduct searches, raids, seizures and interceptions of communications. The judge responsible for the control of constitutional guarantees rules on the validity of these actions within 36 hours.
3. Take possession of material evidence and ensure its safeguarding during trial. If additional measures which imply the infringement of fundamental rights are required, authorization must be obtained from the judge responsible for the control of guarantees in order to proceed.
4. Present the written indictment before the trial judge to begin a public, oral and adversarial trial.
5. Request the preclusion of the investigation from the trial judge when there are no merits to the case.
6. Request from the trial judge the necessary measures to assist victims, provide legal remedy and provide reparations to those affected.
7. Oversee the protection of victims, juries, witnesses and all other intervenants in the criminal procedure.
8. Manage and coordinate the role of the judicial police carried out by the National Police and other bodies as established by law.
9. Other responsibilities assigned by law.

The special powers of the office of the Attorney General are:

1. Investigate and bring charges, if there are sufficient grounds, against senior officials who are subject to special constitutional protection (fuero constitucional).
2. Appoint and dismiss employees under its control.
3. Take direct charge of investigations and cases, at whichever stage.
4. Participate in the design of public policy on criminal matters and present bills to that respect.
5. Grant temporary powers to public bodies to undertake functions of the judicial police.
6. Provide the government with information about investigations being conducted, when necessary for the maintenance of public order.

== See also ==
- Constitution
- Constitutional law
- Constitutional economics
- Constitutionalism
