= Castellanos (surname) =

Castellanos is a Spanish habitational surname with the meaning "[from a place founded or inhabited by] Castilians". Notable people with the surname include:

== Arts ==
- Antonio Castellanos (born 1946), Mexican sculptor
- Enrique Abaroa Castellanos, Mexican landscape artist
- Evencio Castellanos (1915–1984), Venezuelan pianist and classical musician
- Horacio Castellanos Moya (born 1957), Salvadoran writer
- Jesus Castellanos (1878–1912), Cuban writer, journalist and lawyer
- Jerry Castellanos (born, 1983), Cuban American Rock musician
- John Castellanos (born 1957), American actor
- Juan de Castellanos, 16th-century Colombian poet
- Julio Castellanos (1905–1947), Mexican painter and engraver
- Lincoln A. Castellanos, American actor
- Manuel Castellanos López (born 1949), Cuban graphic artist
- Mirla Castellanos, Venezuelan singer
- Rafael Antonio Castellanos (c. 1725–1791), Guatemalan classical composer
- Rosario Castellanos (1925–1974), Mexican poet and author
- Teo Castellanos, American theater director
- Vincent Castellanos (born 1961), American actor

== Government ==
- Aarón Castellanos (1799–1880), Argentine businessman and military commander
- Adolfo Jiménez Castellanos (1844–1929), last Spanish Governor General of Cuba
- Alex Castellanos (born 1954), Cuban-American political consultant
- Carlos Octavio Castellanos (born 1977), Mexican politician
- César Castellanos (1947–1998), Honduran politician
- Gumercindo Castellanos (born 1953), Mexican politician
- José Castellanos Contreras (1893–1977), Salvadoran army colonel and diplomat
- Martín Ramos Castellanos (born 1961), Mexican politician
- Milton Castellanos Everardo (1920–2011), Mexican politician and lawyer
- Roberto Domínguez Castellanos (born 1954), Mexican politician
- Sara Castellanos (born 1992), Colombian politician
- Sara Isabel Castellanos Cortés (born 1946), Mexican politician
- Sergio Arturo Castellanos (born 1969), Honduran politician
- Victoriano Castellanos (1795–1862), President of Honduras
- Wilfredo Bustillo Castellanos (born 1958), Honduran politician

== Religion ==
- César Castellanos, Colombian pastor
- Claudia Rodríguez de Castellanos, Colombian evangelical pastor
- Leonardo Castellanos y Castellanos (1862−1912), Mexican Catholic bishop
- Nicolás Antonio Castellanos Franco (1935–2025), Spanish Roman Catholic missionary and bishop
- Pedro Castellanos (1902–1961), Mexican priest and architect

== Science ==
- Agustin Walfredo Castellanos (1902–2000), Cuban-American physician
- Antonio Castellanos Mata (1947–2016), Spanish physicist
- Francisco Xavier Castellanos (born 1953), American neuroscientist
- Julieta Castellanos (born 1954), Honduran sociologist and president of the National Autonomous University of Honduras

== Sports ==
- Alejandro Castellanos (born 1979), Honduran swimmer
- Alex Castellanos (baseball) (born 1986), American baseball player
- David Castellanos (born 1980), American soccer player
- Deyna Castellanos (born 1999), Venezuelan women's soccer player
- Humberto Castellanos (born 1998), Mexican baseball player
- Jesús Antonio Castellanos (born 1978), Spanish footballer
- Leandro Castellanos (born 1984), Colombian footballer
- Marianella Castellanos (born 1984), Venezuelan softball player
- Nick Castellanos (born 1992), American baseball player
- Osvaldo Castellanos (1919–1984), Cuban baseball manager
- Santiago Castellanos (born 1977), Spanish swimmer
- Tommy Castellanos (born 2003), American football player
- Valentín Castellanos (born 1998), Argentine footballer
- Víctor Castellanos (1934–1999), Guatemalan sports shooter

== Other ==
- Luis Castellanos Tapias, Colombian lawyer
- Migbelis Castellanos (born 1995), Venezuelan model and beauty queen

== See also ==
- Mateo Castellanos, a fictional character from the ITV sitcom Benidorm
- Sebastian Castellanos, the main character in The Evil Within series
- Castellanos (disambiguation)
- Castellano (surname)
