= Castellani =

Castellani is a surname of Italian origin meaning 'castellan'. Notable people with the name include:

- Aldo Castellani (1874–1971), Italian pathologist and bacteriologist
- Andrea Castellani (born 1972), former Italian rugby union player
- Bruto Castellani (1881–1933), Italian film actor of the silent era
- Carlo Castellani (1909–1944), Italian footballer
- Cesar Castellani (died 1905), Maltese architect
- Christopher Castellani (b. 1972), American novelist
- Daniel Castellani (b. 1961), Argentine volleyball player
- Daniela Castellani (born 1975), Italian softball player
- Enrico Castellani (1930–2017), Italian artist
- Giovanni Castellani (1888–1953), Italian archbishop and Vatican diplomat
- Giulio Giacomo Castellani (1619–1694), Roman Catholic Bishop of Cagli
- Gonzalo Pablo Castellani (born 1987), Argentine footballer
- Ines Castellani Fantoni Benaglio, also known by the pseudonym of Memini (1849–1897, Azzate), Italian writer
- Iván Castellani (born 1991), Argentine volleyball player
- John Castellani (1926–2021), American basketball player
- Leonardo Castellani (1899–1981), Argentine author, poet, and theologian
- Leonardo Castellani (engraver) (1896–1984), Italian engraver mainly active depicting landscapes with chalcography
- Mario Castellani (1906–1978), Italian comic actor
- Massimo Castellani (born 1961), Italian diver
- Michel Castellani, French politician
- Raymond Castellani (born 1933), American actor and founder of the Frontline Foundation
- Renato Castellani (1913–1985), Italian film director and screenwriter
- Rocky Castellani (b. 1926), American boxer
- Rudolph J. Castellani (b. 1964), American neuropathologist
- Ryan Castellani (b. 1996), American baseball player
- Stefano Castellani (born 1992), Italian footballer
- Valentino Castellani (b. 1940), Italian professor and politician; mayor of Turin 1993–2001

== See also ==
- Castellano (surname)
- Castellani (goldsmiths)
