= Castellano =

Castellano may refer to:

- Castilian (disambiguation) (Spanish: castellano)
  - Castile (historical region)
- Spanish language, or Castilian (Spanish: castellano)
  - Castilian Spanish
- Castellano (surname), including a list of people with the name
- Castellano (grape), or Albillo, a Spanish wine grape
- Castellano, Trentino, a village in Italy
- Castellano (river), a river in Italy

== See also ==
- Castellanos (disambiguation)
- Castellani (disambiguation)
- Carea Castellano Manchego, a dog breed native to Spain
