= Castellani (disambiguation) =

Castellani is a surname of Italian origin.

Castellani may also refer to:

- Castellani (people), an ancient Iberian or pre-Roman people of the Iberian peninsula
- Castellani (wine), an Italian wine company
- Castellani Painter, a 6th-century BC Attic vase painter

== See also ==
- Castellan, medieval European governor of a castle
- Castellano (surname)
- Altocumulus castellanus cloud
