= Carlos Castellanos =

Carlos Castellanos may refer to:

- Carlos Castellanos (footballer) (1881–1903), Spanish footballer
- Carlos Castellanos Cermeño (1920–2009), Colombian doctor and politician
- Carles Castellanos i Llorenç (born 1942), Catalan writer, translator, and political activist
- Carlos Octavio Castellanos (born 1977), Mexican politician

== See also ==
- Carlos Castellano Gómez (1904–2002), Spanish composer and musician
