= Castellano (surname) =

Castellano is a Spanish and Italian surname. Notable people with the surname include:

- Abel Castellano Jr. (born 1983), Venezuelan jockey
- Dani Castellano (born 1987), Spanish footballer
- Daniel Castellano (born 1972), Venezuelan journalist, writer and researcher
- Fabio Castellano (born 1998), Italian professional footballer
- Franco Castellano (1925–1999), Italian screenwriter and film director
- Frank Castellano (born 1964), Commander of USS Bainbridge during hostage rescue
- Javi Castellano (born 1987), Spanish professional footballer
- Javier Castellano (born 1977), Venezuelan jockey
- José María Castellano, (1947–2025), Spanish businessman
- Manuel Castellano (disambiguation), multiple people
- Mateo Castellano (born 1996), Argentine footballer
- Paco Castellano (born 1944), Spanish retired footballer
- Paul Castellano (1915–1985), American mafia boss
- Pedro Castellano (born 1970), Venezuelan baseball player
- Ramón Castellano de Torres (born 1947), Spanish expressionist painter
- Ramón José Castellano (1903–1979), Argentine Archbishop of Córdoba
- Richard S. Castellano (1933–1988), American actor
- Richie Castellano (born 1980), American bandleader, singer, songwriter and musician
- Talia Castellano (1999–2013), American blogger
- Tomás M. Castellano (1884–1921), Spanish poet
- Torry Castellano (born 1979), drummer of The Donnas
- Vittorio Castellano (1909–1997), Italian statistician

== See also ==
- Castellani, a surname
- Castellanos (surname)
