= César Castellanos =

César Castellanos may refer to:

- César Castellanos (pastor), Colombian pastor
- César Castellanos (politician) (1948–1998), Honduras politician

== See also ==
- Castellanos (surname)
