= Manuel Castellanos =

Manuel Castellanos may refer to:

- Manuel Castellanos (footballer), Spanish footballer
- Manuel Castellanos López (born 1949), Cuban graphic artist

== See also ==
- Manuel Castellano (disambiguation)
