= Alfred Hübler =

German physicist

- Born: May 16, 1957; Munich, Germany
- Died: January 27, 2018 (aged 60)
- Education: Technical University of Munich
- Scientific career
- Fields: Physics
- Workplaces: University of Illinois at Urbana-Champaign

Alfred Wilhelm Hübler (May 16, 1957 – January 27, 2018) was a German-born research physicist at the University of Illinois at Urbana-Champaign (UIUC) Frederick Seitz Materials Research Laboratory as well as a tenured faculty member in the University of Illinois Department of Physics. He was the director of the Center for Complex Systems Research (CCSR) and an external faculty member of the Santa Fe Institute.

== Biography ==
Alfred Hübler was born in Munich, West Germany in 1957. He received his diploma in 1983 and Ph.D. in 1987, summa cum laude, from the Department of Physics, Technical University of Munich. His Ph.D. research was on controlling chaos and fractal particle agglomeration processes. After his Ph.D., Hubler joined Hermann Haken's synergetics group at the University of Stuttgart as a post doctoral researcher.

Hübler became a faculty member of the Department of Physics at the University of Illinois at Urbana-Champaign in 1989. He was also a long-time external faculty member of New Mexico's Santa Fe Institute. From 1993 to 1994, he was a Toshiba chair professor at Keio University in Tokio, Japan. He was Executive Editor of the journal Complexity.

Hübler published more than 50 papers in peer-reviewed journals about his experimental and theoretical research on complex systems. His 2008 publication, entitled "A simple, low-cost data-logging pendulum built from a computer mouse" is one of the most downloaded papers of all Institute of Physics journal articles (in the top 3%). The American Physical Society (APS) listed his paper on mixed reality on the APS tipsheet and invited him to give a press conference on this topic at the 2008 March meeting. Hübler has a 1997 US patent on minimum dissipation quantum-dot transistors and in 2009 the UIUC filed a patent in his name on digital quantum batteries.

Hübler died in 2018 from lymphoma.

== Research interests ==
Concepts governing the dynamics and structure of emergent patterns in open dissipative systems; mixed reality; prediction and control of fractal network dynamics; entrainment of cancer cells; energy conversion, storage, and distribution; dissipate wave-particle systems; solitons; homeopathy; flames and shock waves; turbulence; reverse osmosis and filtration with fractal absorbers; conceptual networks; quantitative measures for knowledge and intelligence; natural language parsing.

== Publications ==
Here are some of Hübler's more important publications:

- Dinkelacker F.; Hübler A.; Lüscher E. (1987). "Pattern formation of powder on a vibrating disc". Biol. Cybern. 56: 51–56. doi:10.1007/bf00333067. S2CID 40218549.
- Cremers J.; Hübler A. (1987). "Construction of differential equations from experimental data". Z. Naturforsch. 42a (8): 797–802. Bibcode:1987ZNatA..42..797C. doi:10.1515/zna-1987-0805. S2CID 3490514.
- Hübler A.; Lüscher E. (1989). "Resonant Stimulation and Control of Nonlinear Oscillators". Naturwissenschaften. 76 (2): 67–69. Bibcode:1989NW.....76...67H. doi:10.1007/BF00396707. S2CID 9160577.
- Hübler A (1989). "Adaptive Control of Chaotic Systems". Helv. Phys. Acta. 62: 343–346.
- Wittmann R.; Kautzky T.; Hübler A.; Lüscher E. (1991). "A simple experiment for the examination of dendritic river systems". Naturwissenschaften. 78 (1): 23–25. Bibcode:1991NW.....78...23W. doi:10.1007/bf01134037. S2CID 26390204.
- Sperl M.; Chang A.; Weber N.; Hübler A. (1999). "Hebbian learning in the agglomeration of conducting particles". Phys. Rev. E. 59 (3): 3165–3168. Bibcode:1999PhRvE..59.3165S. doi:10.1103/physreve.59.3165.
- Melby P.; Kaidel J.; Weber N.; Hübler A. (2000). "Adaptation to the edge of chaos in the self-adjusting logistic map". Phys. Rev. Lett. 84 (26): 5991–5993. arXiv:nlin/0007006. Bibcode:2000PhRvL..84.5991M. doi:10.1103/physrevlett.84.5991. PMID 10991106. S2CID 11333135.
- Strelioff C.; Hübler A. (2006). "Medium term prediction of chaos". Phys. Rev. Lett. 96 (4) 044101. Bibcode:2006PhRvL..96d4101S. doi:10.1103/physrevlett.96.044101. PMID 16486826. S2CID 2254891.
- Singleton M.S.; Hübler A. (2007). "Learning rate and attractor size of the single-layer perceptrons". Phys. Rev. E. 75 (2): 057201. Bibcode:2007PhRvE..75b6704S. doi:10.1103/physreve.75.026704. PMID 17358448.
- Hübler A.; Osuagwu O. (2010). "Digital Quantum Batteries: Energy and information storage in nano vacuum, tube arrays". Complexity. 15 (5): 48–55. doi:10.1002/cplx.20306.
- Soni V.; Ketisch P.; Rodriguez J.; Shpunt A.; Hubler A. (2011). "Topological similarities in electrical and hydrological drainage networks". J. Appl. Phys. 109 (3): 036103–036103–3. Bibcode:2011JAP...109c6103S. doi:10.1063/1.3533389.
- A. Hubler et al. (2013), "Nano Vacuum Tube Arrays for Energy Storage", US Patent, No. 8,699,206.
- Hubler A.; Lyon David (2013). "Gap Size Dependence of the Dielectric Strength in Nano Vacuum Gaps". IEEE Transactions on Dielectrics and Electrical Insulation. 20 (4): 1467–1471. doi:10.1109/TDEI.2013.6571470. S2CID 709782.
- Hubler A.; Tomicic M. (2013). "Star Shaped Solids: Objects with a Negative Dimension". Complexity. 19 (3): 7–9. Bibcode:2014Cmplx..19c...7H. doi:10.1002/cplx.21488.
- Hubler A (2013). "Synthetic Atoms: Large energy density and record power density". Complexity. 18 (4): 12–14. Bibcode:2013Cmplx..18d..12H. doi:10.1002/cplx.21440.
- E. Shinn, A. Hubler, D. Lyon, M. Grosse-Perdekamp, A. Bezryadin, and A. Belkin (2013), "Nuclear Energy Conversion with Stacks of Graphene Nano-capacitors", Complexity 18 (3): 24-27 (won DOE Nuclear Fuel Cycle Innovation Award).
- A. Hubler and D. Lyon, (2014). "Gap Size Dependence of the Dielectric Strength in Nano Vacuum Gaps". IEEE Trans. Dielectr. Electr. Insul. 20, 4, 1467-1471
- Belkin A.; Hubler A.; Bezryadin A. (2015). "Self-Assembled Wiggling Nano-Structures and the Principle of Maximum Entropy Production". Sci. Rep. 5: 8323. Bibcode:2015NatSR...5.8323B. doi:10.1038/srep08323. PMC 4321171. PMID 25662746.
- Stephenson C.; Hubler A. (2015). "Stability and conductivity of self assembled wires in a transverse electric field". Sci. Rep. 5 15044. Bibcode:2015NatSR...515044S. doi:10.1038/srep15044. PMC 4604515. PMID 26463476.
- Stephenson C., Lyon; D., Hubler A. (2017). "Topological properties of a self-assembled electrical network via ab initio calculation". Sci. Rep. 5: 15044. Bibcode:2017NatSR...741621S. doi:10.1038/srep41621. PMC 5290745. PMID 28155863.
- Belkin A.; Bezryadin A.; Hendren L.; Hubler A. (2017). "Recovery of Alumina Nanocapacitors after High Voltage Breakdown". Sci. Rep. 5 (1): 15044. Bibcode:2017NatSR...7..932B. doi:10.1038/s41598-017-01007-9. PMC 5430567. PMID 28428625.
- Bezryadin A.; Belkin A.; E. Ilin; M. Pak; E.Colla; Hubler A. (2017). "Large energy storage efficiency of the dielectric layer of graphene nanocapacitors". Nanotechnology. 28 (49): 495401. arXiv:2011.11867. Bibcode:2017Nanot..28W5401B. doi:10.1088/1361-6528/aa935c. PMID 29027908. S2CID 44693636.
