= Castellanos =

Castellanos may refer to:

== People ==
- Castellanos (surname)

== Places ==
=== Argentina ===
- Castellanos Department, department of Santa Fe Province
- Aarón Castellanos, locality in the Santa Fe Province
- Castellanos, Santa Fe, locality in the Santa Fe Province

=== Spain ===
- Castellanos de Castro, municipality in the province of Burgos
- Castellanos de Moriscos, municipality in the province of Salamanca
- Castellanos de Villiquera, municipality in the province of Salamanca
- Castellanos de Zapardiel, municipality in the province of Ávila

=== Uruguay ===
- Castellanos, Uruguay, locality in the Canelones Department

== See also ==
- Castellano (disambiguation)
- Pérez Castellanos, neighbourhood of Montevideo, Uruguay
