= Ines Castellani Fantoni Benaglio =

Italian writer

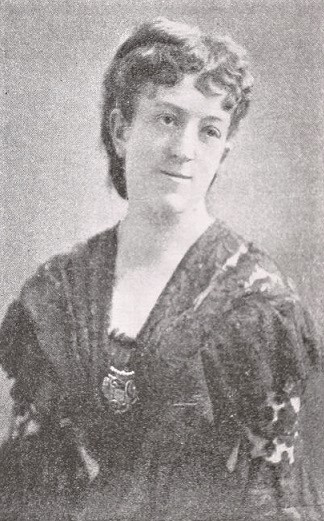
- Born: c. 1849; Pavia
- Died: 6 May 1897; Azzate
- Other name: Memini
- Spouse: Luigi Benaglio

Ines Castellani Fantoni Benaglio, also known by the pseudonym of Memini (c. 1849, in Pavia – 6 May 1897, in Azzate), was an Italian writer and a member of a noble Piedmontese family. She was a countess.

== Life and work ==
Benaglio was known to have lived in Florence and Milan but little information has been found about her early education. Her mother, Elena Dattili di Borgo Priolo, was known in literary circles, allowing her to expose Ines to literate compatriots. Despite a lack of formal learning opportunities, Ines exhibited a broad knowledge of languages making her an ideal candidate for doing translations. She made her debut as a writer in 1880, with Estella and Nemorino, after which she wrote novels and short stories.

Benaglio also wrote for magazines, including La Perseveranza, La Gazzetta Provinciale and Vita Intimate.

She wrote numerous novels, which attracted the attention of Anna Radius Zuccari, and they were friends.

== Private life ==
Countess Benaglio married her cousin, Count Luigi Benaglio (1843–1908), who was also a poet, but the marriage proved to be an unhappy one. Countess moved away, first to Rome, then to Azzate, where she died on 6 May 1897 after a long illness.

== Selected works ==
=== Novels and short stories ===
- Estella and Nemorino (1880)
- Fra quadri e statue (1882)
- Mia (1884)
- La marchesa d’Arcello (1886)
- Mario (1887)
- Un tramonto e altri racconti (1888)
- Le Perichole (1888)
- Anime liete (1889)
- Vita mondana (1891)
- L'ultima primavera (1894)
- Milla d’Astianello (1895)
- Maria d’Ardeano (1896)
- Carina d’Orno (1896)

=== Translations ===
- Ramé Maria Louisa (Ouida), Affreschi ed altri racconti (Frescoes: Dramatic Sketches, 1888).
