= Vittorio Castellano =

Italian statistician

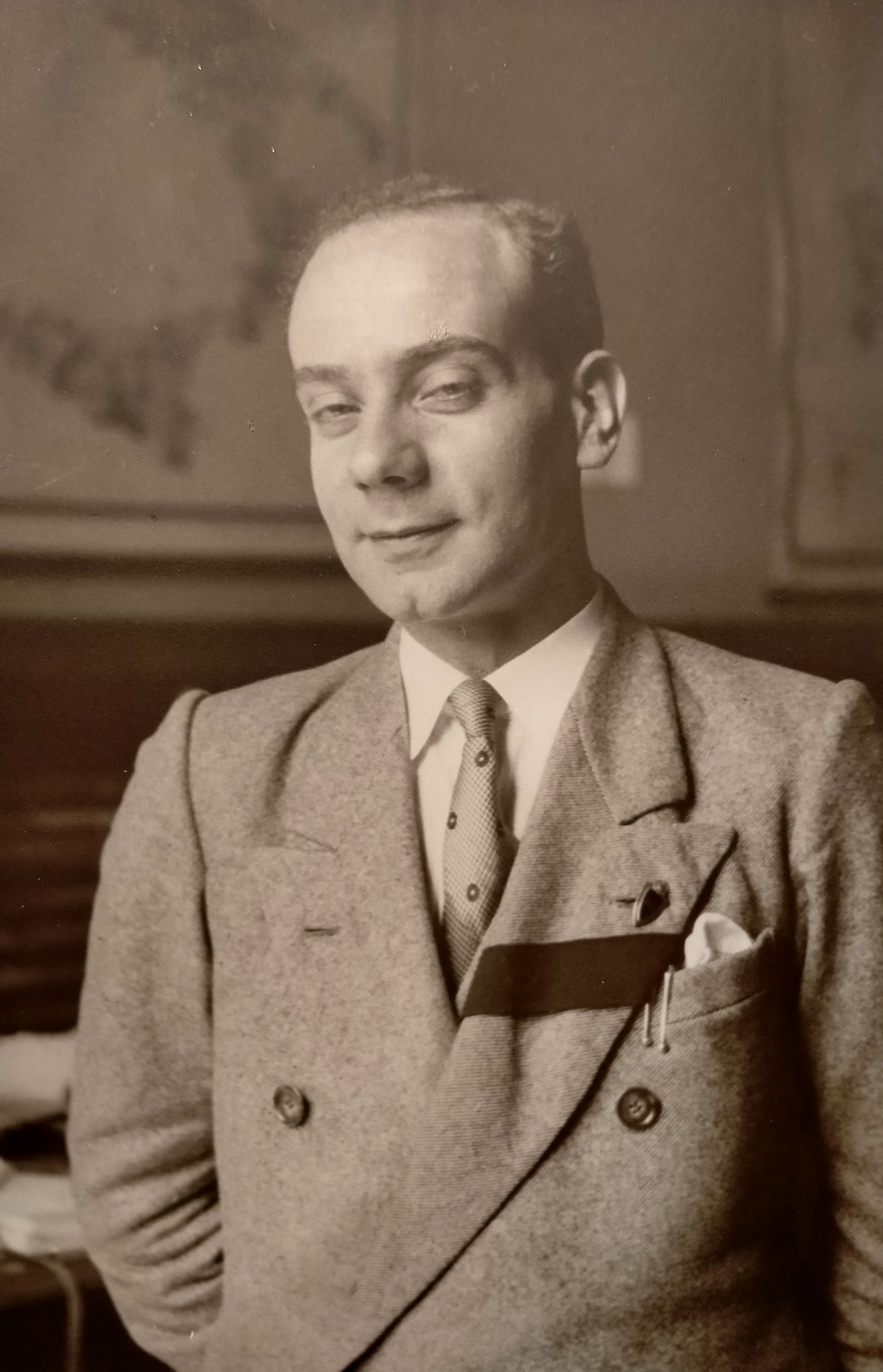
- Born: 29 June 1909; Naples, Italy
- Died: 20 December 1997 (aged 88); Rome, Italy
- Education: University of Rome
- Occupations: Statistician, professor

Castellano Vittorio (29 June 1909 in Naples, Italy – 20 December 1997 in Rome, Italy) was an Italian statistician.

== Biography ==
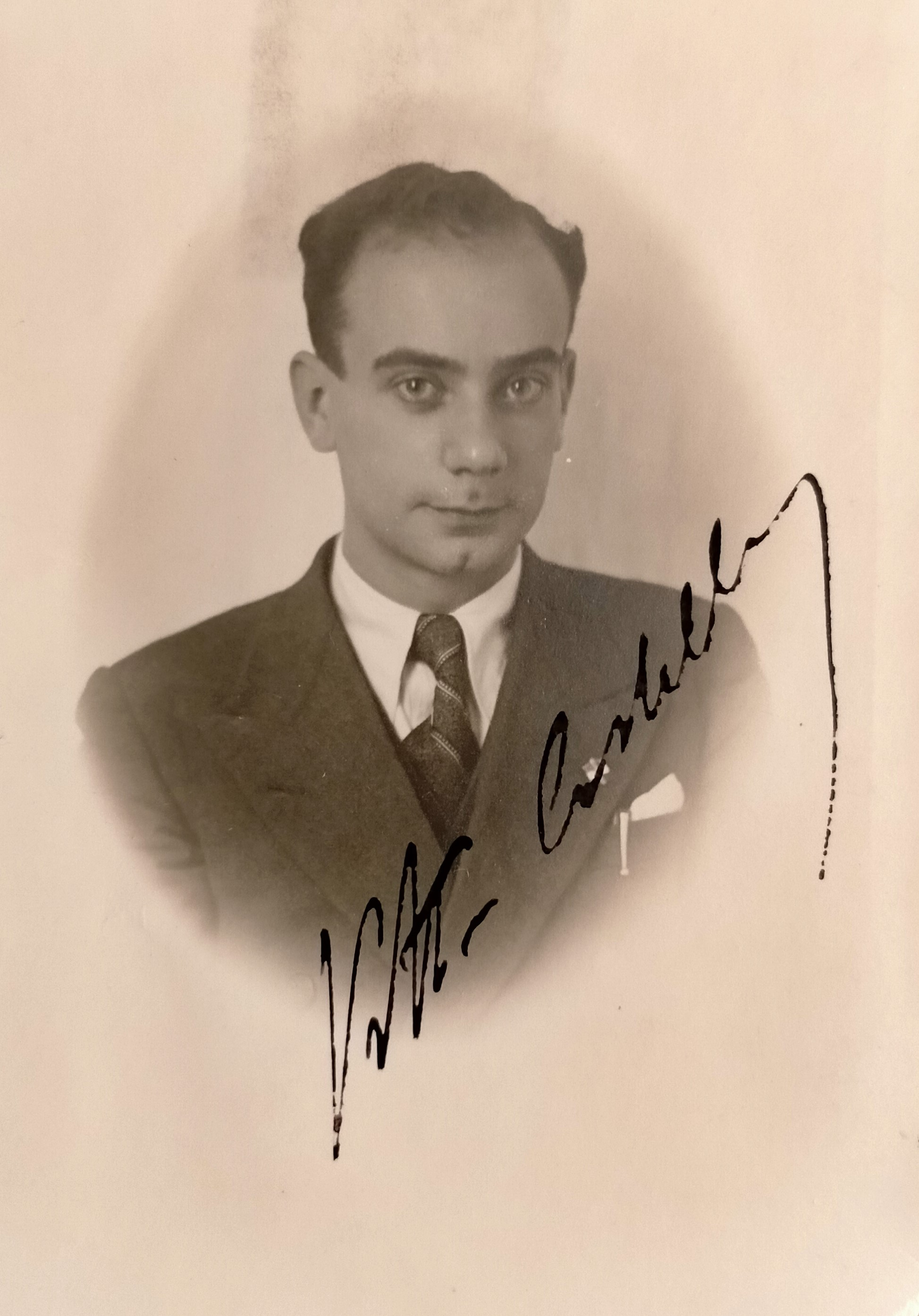

Vittorio Castellano was born in Naples on June the 29th and studied in Rome first Mathematics and Physics the Statistics. In 1031 he held a position at ISTAT. I933 he became assistant professor at Gini's chair, however only in 1953 he took up the chair at Rome University teaching statistics, Sampling Theory and Sociology. His career and life were troubled. In 1937 he was appointed at the Minister of Italian Africa and he left Italy to Eritrea. He conducted the Census of the native population of Eritrea in 1939, and he investigated on demographic development in Eritrea during the fifty years of Italian administration (1947). There he held teaching in Statistics. His contacts with Corrado Gini has always been intensive and collaborative. He was Dean of the Faculty of statistical Sciences (1972–1982), member of CNR(1963–1971) and CUN (1977–1981). He wrote more than 200 publications. His contributions in statistical method and probability are very important, as well as to researches in the demographic and sociological fields. The main arguments of interest have been about means and variability, concentration indices, moments, sampling theory and statistical inference. For a complete biography, see G. Leti, Ricordo di Vittorio Castellano, Statistica, LVIII, 2, 1998.

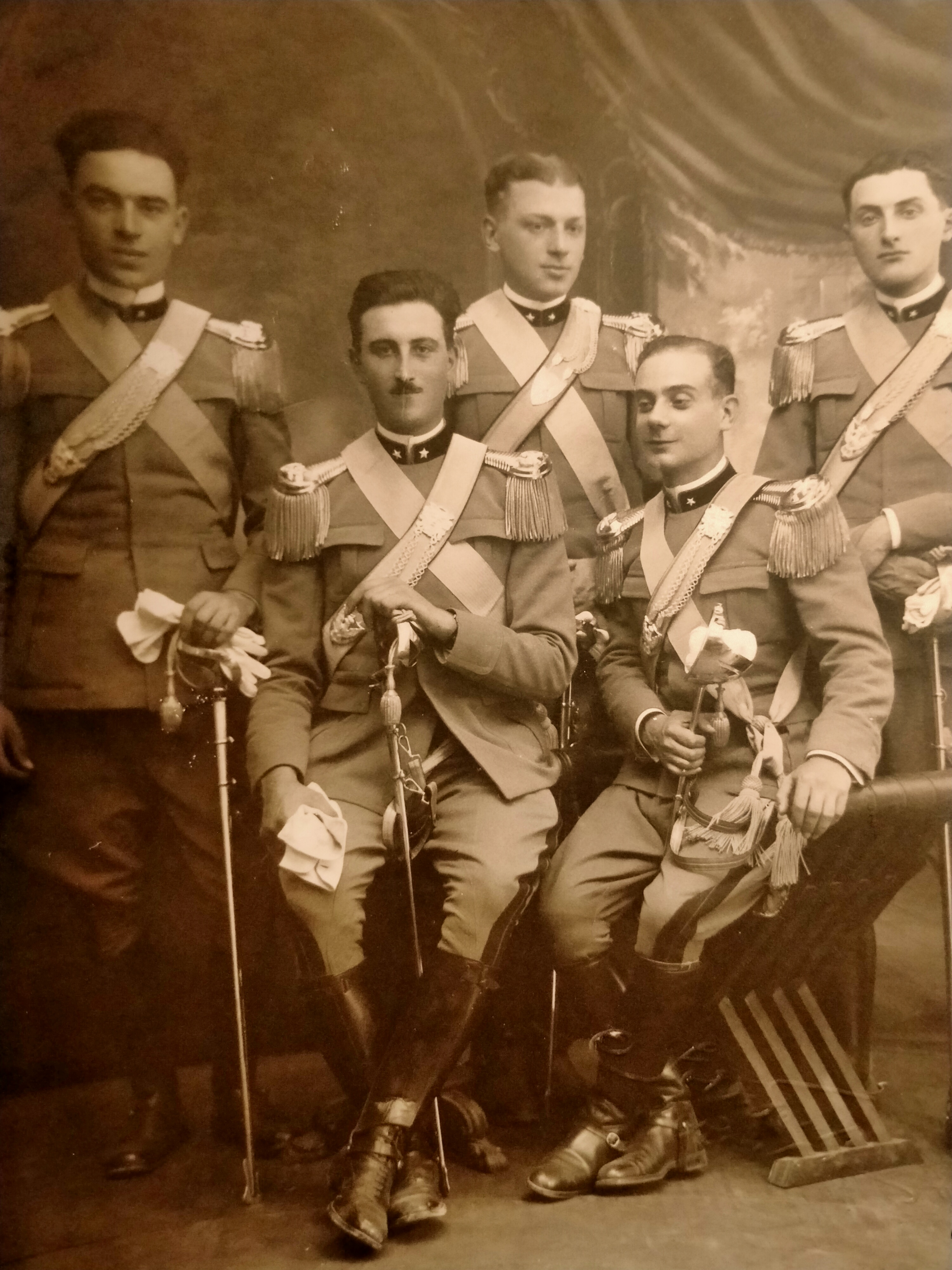

== Research interests ==
Statistics, social statistics, and sociology

== Education ==
Degree in mathematics at University of Rome in 1929 and Statistical and Actuarial Sciences in 1931.

== Academic positions ==
Professor of Statistics in Rome, since 1953, and in Istanbul (1951–53).

== Honours, awards ==
Member of the American Statistical Association, and of the International Institute of Sociology. Emeritus by University of Rome. Honorary Member of the City University of New York's Academy of the Humanities and Sciences.

== Known for ==
Means and moments, quantitative sociology and anthropometry.

== Publications ==
- Sulle relazioni tra curve di frequenza e curve di concentrazione e sui rapporti di concentrazione corrispondenti a determinate distribuzioni, (1933);
- Sulle teorie della cosiddetta inferenza statistica, (1955);
- Contributi alle teorie della correlazione e della connessione tra due variabili, (1957);
- Corso di sociologia generale (1960)
- Istituzioni di statistica, Roma (1962);
- Osservazioni su alcune medie continue, Statistica, VIII, 1, (1948);
- Sui quozienti di eliminazione, Metron, XVI, 1–2, (1951);
- Introduzione alla teoria dei campioni, Statistica, XI, 3–4, (1951);
- Sulla teoria della popolazione stabile, Genus, IX, (1951);
- Sur l’entropie et d’autres difficultés des sciences qui influencent la culture contemporaine, et sur la place de la Statistiquedans un tableau révisé du role des sciences, Metron, XLIII, 3–4, (1985);
- Civiltà e cultura. Per una mappa delle culture, sulla scala delle civilizzazioni, Sociologia XXVIII, 1–2, (1994);
