= Antonio Castellanos Mata =

Spanish physicist

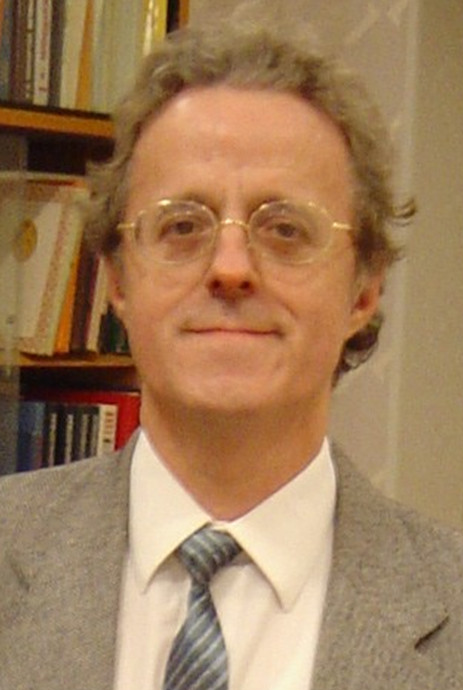
Antonio Castellanos Mata in 2004.

Antonio Castellanos Mata (7 March 1947 – 27 January 2016) was a Spanish physicist known for his works in the field of Electrohydrodynamics.

== Personal life ==
Antonio Castellanos Mata was born on 7 March 1947, in Antoñanes del Páramo near León, Spain. A few years later, the family moved to León. He was the third and youngest child of Manuel Castellanos Berjón (1910–1993), a school teacher, and Fidela Mata Sarmiento (1915–2013).

As a child, Castellanos Mata was very religious and decided to become a priest. While studying in a seminary, he began studying mathematics and physics on his own. Several months before graduating, he was expelled from the seminary.

Antonio Castellanos Mata then entered the University of Valladolid. He was awarded the first PhD in physics at the university. He was granted a Fulbright scholarship and spent a year at the Ohio State University. He established long-lasting scientific collaborations in many countries. One of his close friends was Pierre Atten, who inspired Mata with a love for electrohydrodynamics.

Antonio Castellanos Mata's first wife was María Elena Navarrete Sandoval. They married in 1975 and had a son, Antonio Castellanos Navarrete, and a daughter, Dayeli Anahí Castellanos Navarrete. In 2006, he married Elena Grekova, with whom he had two sons.

In 2014, Castellanos Mata was diagnosed with kidney cancer. He died on 27 January 2016. Through the end of his life, Castellanos Mata taught classes, continued research, and directed scientific projects.

== Scientific career ==
Antonio Castellanos defended his PhD thesis, Dispersion theory and its application to the reaction 11B(d, α)Be9, at the University of Valladolid in 1972. He worked at many universities: University of Valladolid, University of the Basque Country, Autonomous University of Madrid; since 1983, he was a full professor at the University of Seville. He made long-term scientific visits to the US, France, Nicaragua, and Russia, and collaborated with researchers from the UK, the Netherlands, and China. He worked in various fields of science:

1. Electrohydrodynamics,
2. Gas discharges at atmospheric pressure,
3. Cohesive granular materials.

Mata founded a research group at the University of Seville: Electrohydrodynamics and Cohesive Granular Media. This group includes as today more than 20 researchers. He lectured physics at various universities throughout his career. For his last 33 years, he taught electrodynamics and electromagnetism at the Faculty of Physics of the University of Seville. He directed research projects for more than 30 years, and this made it possible for him to organize two laboratories at the university. While dedicating significant effort to pure science, he was also interested in contemporary problems and collaborated with industry (Xerox Corporation, Novartis, Dow Corning, IFPRI). He authored more than 350 papers, collectively having more than 7800 citations.

Noteworthy results include:

1. Galilean limits of electromagnetism.
2. Temperature equation and entropy production in electrohydrodynamics.
3. Self-similar solution for two-dimensional and axisymmetric plumes.
4. Seminal works on numerical simulation of electrohydrodynamic flows.
5. Physical mechanism of electrothermohydrodynamic instabilities.
6. Energy cascade in electrohydrodynamic turbulence.
7. Stabilization of dielectric liquid bridges by AC electric fields.
8. Theory of AC electroosmosis and electrothermal flows in microsystems.
9. Absence of inertial regimes in fine powders.
10. Model of elastoplastic contact between two powder particles.
11. Microstructure characterization of fluidized bed of fine particles: aggregation, solidlike-fluidlike transition, fluctuations, influence of electromagnetic fields.

== Awards ==
1. Prize FAMA of the University of Seville for his research career (2013).

== Publications ==
Here are some of the most relevant of his publications and patents:

1. A. Castellanos, P. Atten, M. G. Velarde. Oscillatory and steady convection in dielectric liquid layers subjected to unipolar injection and temperature gradient. Physics of Fluids, vol. 27, pp. 1607–1615, 1984.
2. A. Castellanos, P. Atten. Numerical modeling of finite amplitude convection of liquids subjected to unipolar injection. IEEE Transactions on Industry Applications, vol. 23, no. 5, 825–830, 1987.
3. A. Castellanos. Coulomb-driven convection in electrohydrodynamics. IEEE Transactions on Electrical Insulation, vol. 26, pp. 1201–1215, 1991.
4. A. Castellanos, H. González. Stability of inviscid conducting liquid columns subjected to A.C. axial magnetic fields. Journal of Fluid Mechanics, vol. 265, pp. 245–263, 1994.
5. P. A. Vázquez, A. T. Pérez, and A. Castellanos, "Thermal and electrohydrodynamic plumes. A comparative study," Physics of Fluids, vol. 8, no. 8, p. 2091, 1996
6. A. Castellanos, A. González. Nonlinear electrohydrodynamics of free surfaces. IEEE Transactions on Dielectrics and Electrical Insulation, vol. 5, pp. 334–343, 1998.
7. A. Ramos, H. Morgan, N. G. Green, A. Castellanos. AC electrokinetics: a review of forces in microelectrode structures. Journal of Physics D: Applied Physics, vol. 31, no. 18, pp. 2338–2353, 1998.
8. A. Castellanos. Basic concepts and equations in electrohydrodynamics (Chapters 1–4). In: A. Castellanos (editor), Electrohydrodynamics, Springer Verlag, Wien – New York, 1998 (ISBN 3-211-83137-1).
9. A. Castellanos, J. M. Valverde, A. T. Pérez, A. Ramos, P. Keith Watson. Flow regime boundaries in fine cohesive powders. Physical Review Letters, vol. 82, pp. 1156–1159, 1999.
10. A. Castellanos. Entropy production and the temperature equation in electrohydrodynamics. IEEE Transactions on Dielectrics and Electrical Insulation, vol. 10, pp. 22–26, 2003.
11. A. Castellanos, A. Ramos, A. González, N. G. Green, H. Morgan. Electrohydrodynamics and dielectrophoresis in microsystems: scaling laws. Journal of Physics D: Applied Physics, vol. 36, pp. 2584–2597, 2003.
12. A. Castellanos. The relationship between attractive interparticle forces and bulk behaviour in dry and uncharged fine powders. Advances in Physics, vol. 54, no. 4, pp. 263–376, 2005.
13. A. Castellanos, A. T. Pérez. Electrohydrodynamic systems. In: Springer Handbook of Experimental Fluid Mechanics, pp. 1317–1333. Springer, Berlin–Heidelberg, 2007.
14. A. Castellanos, A. Ramos, J. M. Valverde. Device and method for measuring cohesion in fine granular media ( Patent PCT/ES98/00325. 1997. Publication: 2000. Organization: University of Seville)
15. A. Castellanos, M. A. S. Quintanilla, J. M. Valverde. Method and device for measuring the angle of friction and the cohesion of granular media (N P200502533. 11-10-2005 N. International Patent PCT/ WO2007042585A3. Publication: 2007. University of Seville)
