= Goltyr Painter =

Ancient Greek vase painter

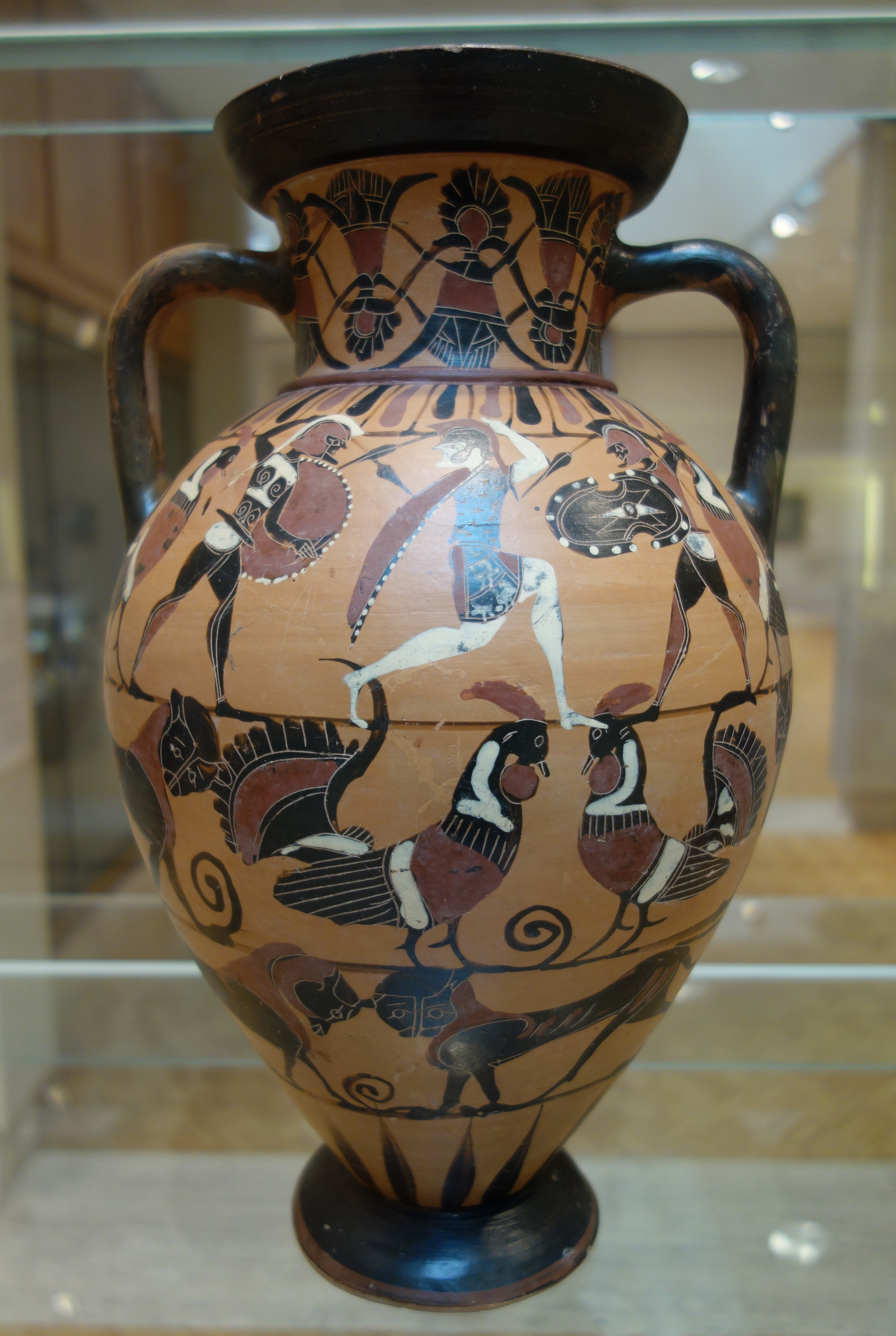
Tyrrhenian Neck Amphora, Goltyr Painter, Greek, ceramic, black figure - Chazen Museum of Art

The Goltyr Painter was an Attic vase painter of the black-figure style. He was active in the second quarter of the sixth century BC. He is well known for his work on Tyrrhenian amphorae. He mostly painted animals, often with rather bulbous heads.

== Bibliography ==
- John Beazley: Attic Black-Figure Vase-Painters, Oxford, 1956, p. 94-106.
- John Boardman: Schwarzfigurige Vasen aus Athen. Ein Handbuch, Mainz, 1977, ISBN 3-8053-0233-9, p. 41.
- Jeroen Kluiver: The Tyrrhenian Group of Black-figure Vases. From the Athenian Kerameikos to the Tombs of South Etruria, Amsterdam, 2003 ISBN 90-72067-10-X
