= Christian Hennig =

German statistician & professor (born 1966)

Christian Martin Hennig
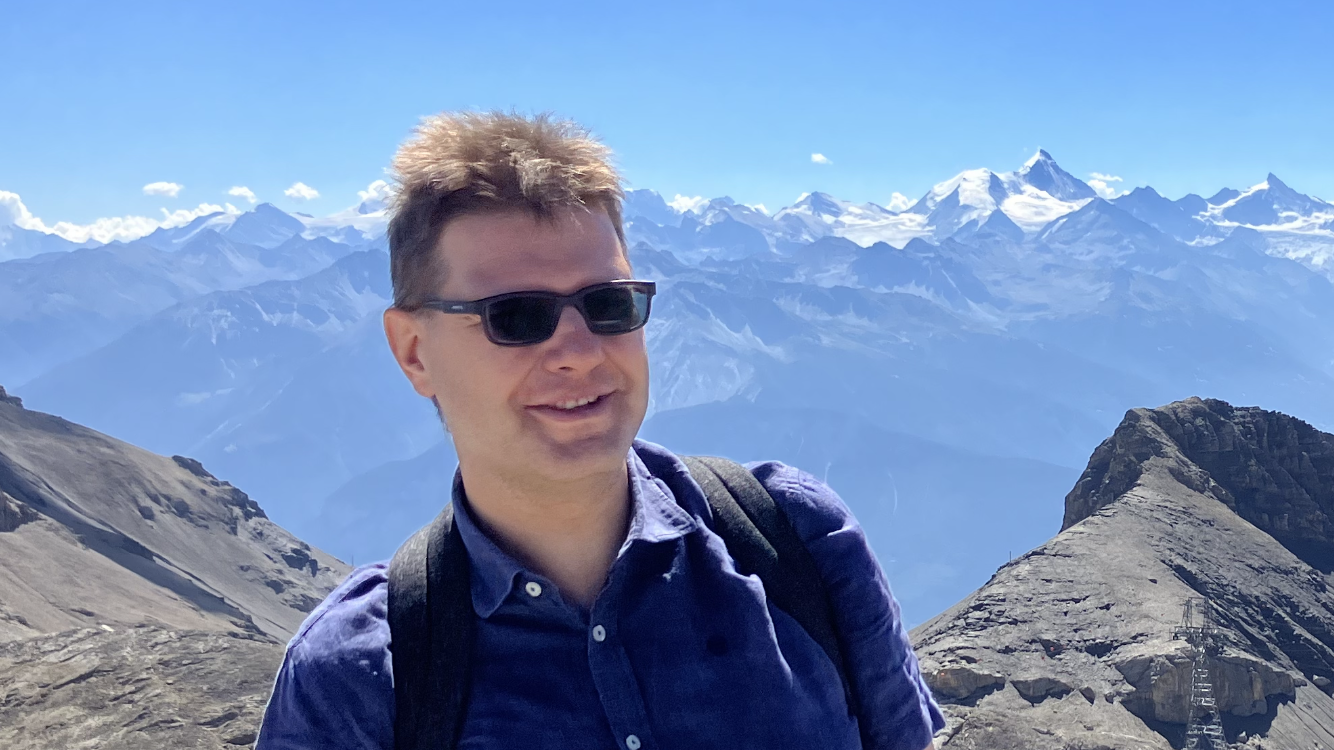
- Christian Hennig in 2023
- Born: 1966
- Education: University of Hamburg
- Scientific career
- Fields: Statistics, particularly robust cluster analysis
- Institutions: University of Bologna (Full Professor)
- Thesis: Datenanalyse mit Modellen fuer Cluster Linearer Regression ("Data analysis by means of models for clusterwise linear regression") (1997)
- Doctoral advisor: Konrad Behnen
- Website: https://www.unibo.it/sitoweb/christian.hennig/en/

Christian Martin Hennig (born 1966) is a German statistician. His work focuses on robust cluster analysis.

== Education and career ==
Hennig completed his doctorate in 1997 at the University of Hamburg, Germany, under the supervision of Konrad Behnen. From October 2001 until September 2003 he was University Lecturer (fixed term postdoctoral position) at the Seminar for Statistics, ETH Zürich. Hennig was a lecturer at the Department of Statistical Science, University College London (UCL) from 2005 on, and became Senior Lecturer in 2010. Since 2019 he is full Professor at the Dipartimento di Scienze Statistiche "Paolo Fortunati" at the University of Bologna.

As of 2023, Hennig serves as the editor-in-chief of the journal Statistica.

== Selected works ==
Hennig has published - partly with co-authors - about 130 papers in scientific journals and conference proceedings as well as - together with M. Meila, F. Murtagh, and R. Rocci - a Handbook of Cluster Analysis:

- Hennig, C., M. Meila, F. Murtagh, and R. Rocci (eds.) (2015). Handbook of Cluster Analysis. Chapman and Hall/CRC, New York 2015, ISBN 978-0-429-18547-2. https://doi.org/10.1201/b19706
- Hennig, C. (2008). Dissolution point and isolation robustness: Robustness criteria for general cluster analysis methods. Journal of Multivariate Analysis 99, 1154–1176. https://doi.org/10.1016/j.jmva.2007.07.002
- Hausdorf, B. and C. Hennig (2010). Species delimitation using dominant and codominant multilocus markers. Systematic Biology 59, 491–503. https://doi.org/10.1093/sysbio/syq039
- Hennig, C. Mathematical Models and Reality: A Constructivist Perspective. Found Sci 15, 29–48 (2010). https://doi.org/10.1007/s10699-009-9167-x
