= Tyrrhenian amphora =

Ancient Greek vase

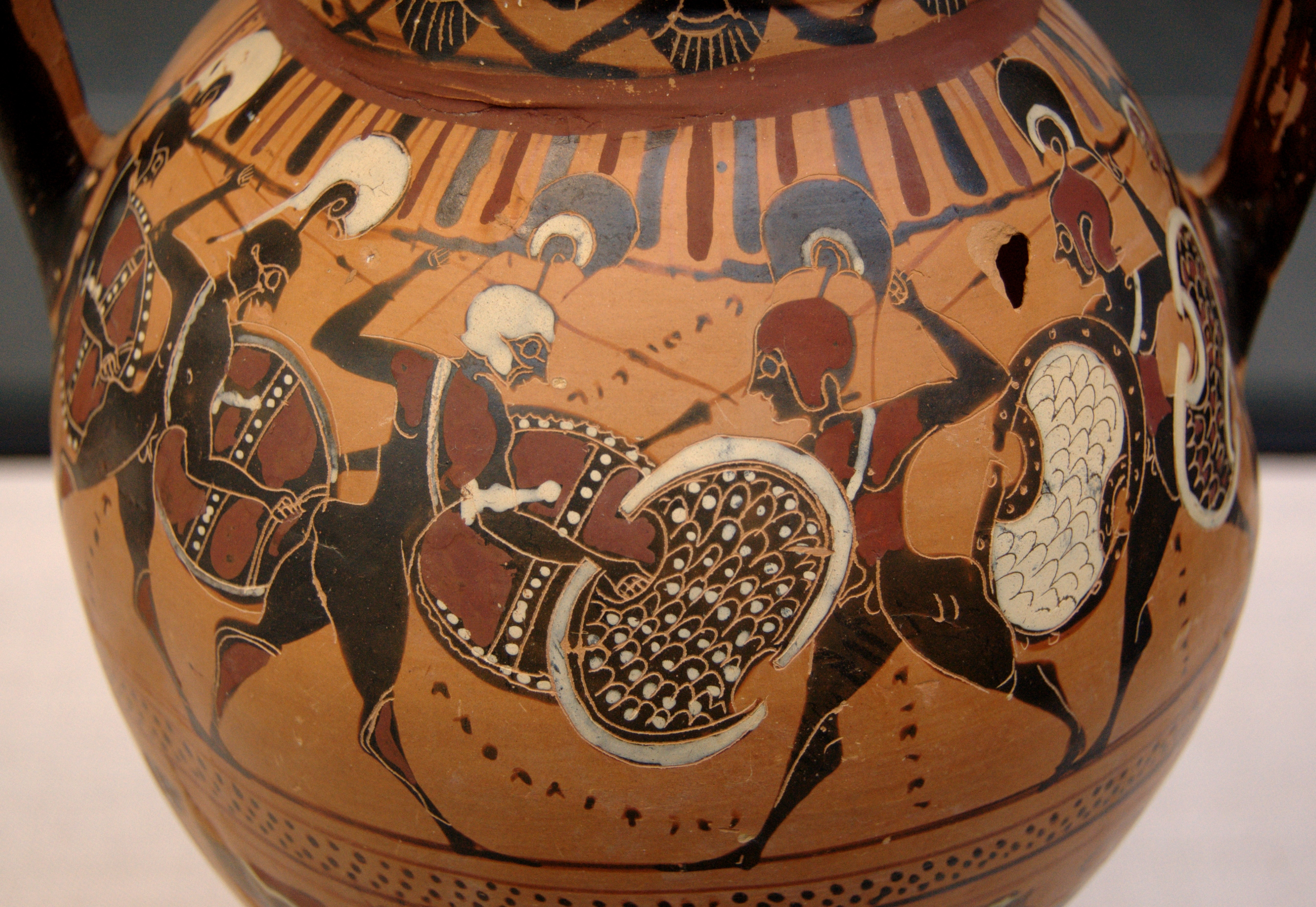
Tyrrhenian amphora by the Fallow Deer Painter of the Tyrrhenian Group. Munich, Staatliche Antikensammlungen

The Tyrrhenian amphora is a specific shape of Attic black-figure neck amphora. Tyrrhenian amphorae were only produced during a short period, about 570/65 to 545 BC. The body is ovoid in shape and bears striking decorations. The neck is usually decorated with a lotus-palmette festoon or cross. The neck always terminates in a red-painted plastic ridge. The vase body is painted with several friezes. The uppermost of these, on the shoulder, is usually especially notable. It often contains mythological scenes, but the first erotic motifs in Attic vase painting also occur here. Unique motifs include the sacrifice of Polyxena. Often, the figures are explained by added inscriptions. The other friezes, usually two to three in number, are often decorated with animals. At times, a frieze is replaced with a vegetal band, a continuous lotus-palmette festoon.

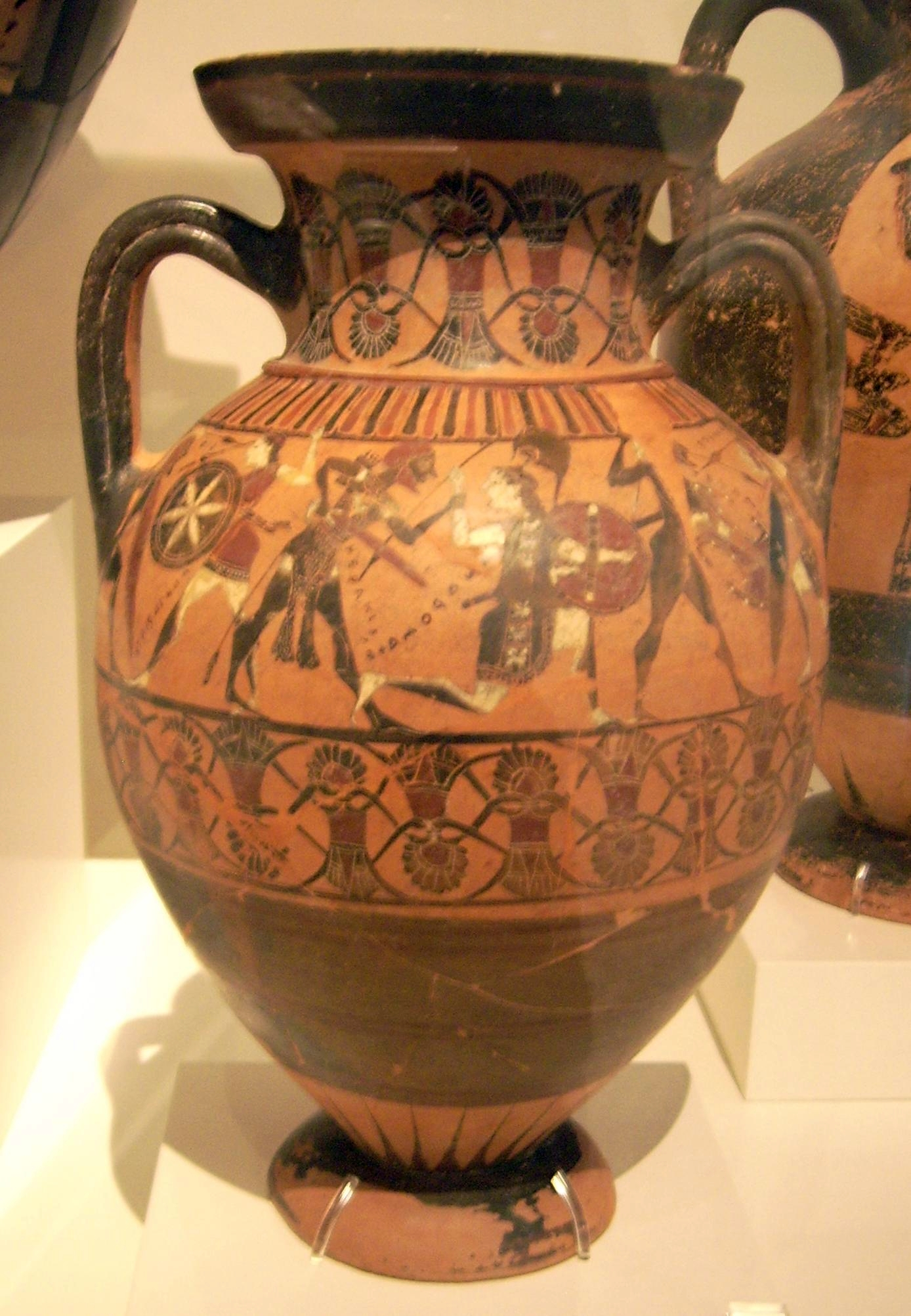
Tyrrhenian amphora by the Prometheus Painter. Front: amazonomachy – Herakles combats Andromache, Telamon fights Anipe and Iphis (Herakles’ wife) fights Panariste. Unknown origin, circa 550 BC. Athens: National Museum.

The animal friezes and use of colour resemble Corinthian vase painting. It is likely that the Attic vase painters copied Corinthian examples, so as to improve their products’ attractivity on the Etruscan markets. Thus, the Athenian producers entered direct competition with the then market leader, Corinth, by producing features popular in Etruria, such as neck amphorae and colourful decoration. Corinth only produced few neck amphorae. Thus, the Athenians apparently deliberately served a niche market. The Etruscans themselves also produced similar vases. The large majority of the nearly 200 Tyrrhenian amphorae now known were found in Etruria. Early artists to paint such vases include the Castellani Painter and the Goltyr Painter, later ones the Prometheus Painter and the Kyllenios Painter.

The Tyrrhenian Group was named after this type of vase. In his 1983 paper '’On the Dating of the Tyrrhenian Group’’, the British archaeologist Tom Carpenter suggested, on the basis of iconographic and epigraphic considerations, that the vases were produced later than normally assumed, namely between 550 and 530 BC. Further, he raised the possibility that they were produced outside Athens, perhaps in northern Attica or even outside Attica.

== Bibliography ==
- Thomas Mannack: Griechische Vasenmalerei. Eine Einführung, Theiss, Stuttgart 2002, p. 117f. ISBN 3-8062-1743-2
