= Raciel López Salazar =

Mexican politician

- Born: Tonalá, Chiapas, Mexico
- Occupation: Deputy
- Political party: PVEM

Raciel López Salazar is a Mexican politician affiliated with the PVEM. He served as Deputy of the LXII Legislature of the Mexican Congress representing Chiapas between 2012 and 2013.
