= Carlos Octavio Castellanos =

Mexican politician

- Born: 26 May 1977 (age 48); Tapachula, Chiapas, Mexico
- Occupations: Deputy and lawyer
- Political party: PVEM

Carlos Octavio Castellanos Mijares (born 26 May 1977) is a Mexican politician affiliated with the PVEM. As of 2013 he served as Deputy of the LXII Legislature of the Mexican Congress representing Chiapas replacing Raciel López Salazar.
