= Agustin Walfredo Castellanos =

Agustín Walfredo Castellanos (September 12, 1902 in Havana, Cuba – December 7, 2000, in Miami, Florida) was a physician. Castellanos obtained his Medical Degree from the University of Havana School of Medicine in 1925. He was a pediatrician, radiologist and cardiologist who was a pioneer in the field of angiocardiography.

== History ==
His initial work was with dogs and cadavers before extending this method to humans. Castellanos and colleagues published the first important paper on the clinical applications of intravenous angiocardiography which was published in the Archivos de la Sociedad de Estudios Clinicos in 1937. This is believed the first publication which dealt with the normal cardiac structure and the changes seen in ventricular septal defect and pulmonary stenosis (Doby, 1976). A year later they pioneered the method of retrograde injection of dye (Perabrodil) into the aorta which was mainly used to diagnose patent ductus arteriosus (Castellanos and Pereira, 1938). Castellanos expanded his work on angiocardiography to include the study of the various congenital malformations of the heart. He also was involved in the development of the procedure known as pneumomediastinum and in multiple investigations involving hematology and infectious diseases.

Castellanos was recognized in Cuba with the establishment at the Children's Hospital in Havana of the Agustín W. Castellanos Foundation for Cardiovascular Research. Internationally he was honored by many societies of pediatric and adult cardiology, radiology and pediatrics. He has been honored in Mexico City with inclusion in the mural honoring the "Great Men of Cardiology" by the famous Mexican artist Diego Rivera located in the Instituto Nacional de Cardiología. Castellanos was twice nominated for the Nobel Prize. In 1959 and 1960, Ecuador and Colombia nominated him for the Nobel Prize in Medicine and Physiology, respectively.

Castellanos immigrated to Miami, Florida, in 1960. He maintained a busy private practice and was a clinical and visiting Professor of Pediatrics at the University Of Miami School Of Medicine, Senior Scientist at the National Children's Cardiac Hospital as well as Acting Chief of Pediatric Cardiology at Variety Children's Hospital. Throughout his career, he authored or coauthored 327 scientific articles. Castellanos died on December 7, 2000, in Miami, Florida.

== Sources ==
- Castellanos A, Pereira R, García-López A: La angio-cardiografía radio-opaca. Arch Soc Est Clin (Havana) 1937:523:31
- Castellanos A, Pereira R, Garcia L: L'Angiocardiographie chez I'enfant. Presse Med 1938:46:1474
- Castellanos A. Pereira R: Counter-current aortography. Rev Cub Cardiol 1939:2:187
- Doby T: Development of Angiography and Cardiovascular Catheterization, p. 150-158. Littleton: Publishing Sciences Group, Inc., 1976
- Snellen HA: History of Cardiology, p. 126. Rotterdam: Donker Academic Publications, 1984
