= Anna Radius Zuccari =

Italian writer (1846–1918)

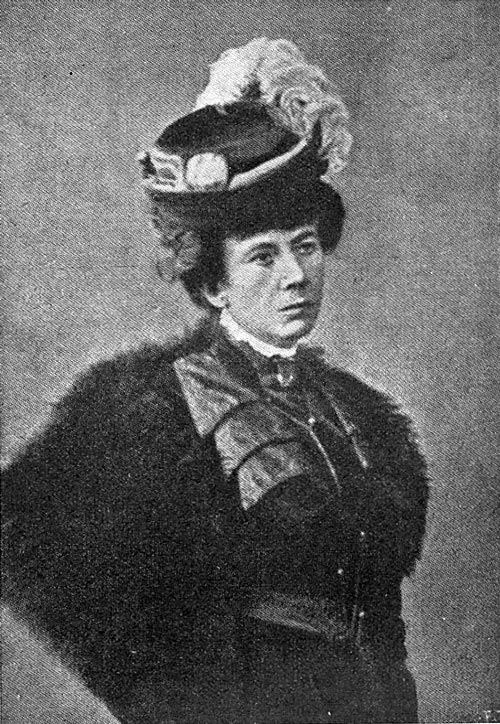
Anna Zuccari (Neera), late 19th-century

Anna Radius Zuccari (May 7, 1846 – July 13, 1918) was an Italian writer who used the pen name Neera.

== Biography ==
The daughter of Fermo Zuccari, an architect, she was born Anna Zuccari in Milan and grew up in Caravaggio. Her mother died when she was ten and she was raised by two older unmarried aunts from her father's family. Her father died when she was twenty. In 1871, she married the banker Emilio Radius and entered Milanese literary circles. She published her first short story in 1875 in the publication Il Pungolo. Zuccari contributed to various magazines and journals, such as Rivista d'Italia, Nuova Antologia, L'Illustrazione Italiana, La Lettura and L'Idea Liberale. In 1890, she founded the journal Vita Intima.

Despite her career as a successful author, it was Zuccari's view that a woman's place was in the home, which she called "real feminism". Her fiction, beginning with Un romanzo (1876), extols maternity as the only proper vocation for women as well as a source of surprising passion. She summarized her conservative views in Idee di una donna (1903 ), having given them more practical form in the Dizionario d'igiene per le famiglie (1881), written jointly with Paolo Mantegazza.

She died in Milan of cancer at the age of 72, being confined to bed by her illness. During the period before her death, she dictated her memoirs which were published after her death as Una giovinezza del secolo XIX (Portrait of a 19th-century youth). Widely popular in her own lifetime, Zuccari was a friend of Capuana and her work was admired by Croce. Recent criticism focuses on the ambivalence of her anti-feminist defence of women.

== Selected works ==
- Un romanzo (A novel) (1876)
- Addio! (Farewell), novel (1877)
- Il castigo (The punishment) (1881)
- Dizionario d'igiene per le famiglie (Dictionary of hygiene for families), instructional (1881), with Paolo Mantegazza
- Teresa, novel (1886)
- Lydia, novel (1887)
- L'indomani (The day after), novel (1890)
- Il libro di mio figlio, essays (1891)
- Battaglie per un'idea, essays (1897)
- Battaglie per un'idea, essays (1898)
- Le idee di una donna (The idea of a woman) (1903)
