= Leonardo Castellani (engraver) =

Italian painter

Leonardo Castellani (1896 – 1984) was an Italian engraver and painter, mainly active depicting landscapes with chalcography.

== Biography ==
Born in Faenza to a furniture maker, he moved to Cesena with his family, and studied there till 1913, when he enrolled in the Accademia di Belle Arti di Firenze, where he studied sculpture along with Osvaldo Licini. After serving in the army during the first World War, he worked in the studio of the sculptor Ettore Ferrari in Rome, where he met the Futurist Giacomo Balla. He returned to Cesena where he worked with ceramics, but by 1928–1930 he began to concentrate on his engravings. He became a teacher of chalcography for the Scuola del Libro in Urbino.

He remained in Urbino most of his life. After the Second World War, he published a number of journals and books containing his engravings, including Quaderni di un calcografo (1955), Cronache d’Amore in versi (1968), Giornate lunghe in Sardegna (1969), 13 Canzonette (1971), Invito in Sicilia (1973), and Donne donne così sia (1979).

In 1986, his widow and sons donated many works to the town of Urbino, to form the nucleus of the Raccolta Castellani exhibition now in the ex-Collegio Raffaello di Urbino.
