= Manuel Castellano =

Manuel Castellano may refer to:

- Manuel Castellano (painter) (1826–1880), Spanish painter
- Lillo (footballer) (Manuel Castellano Castro, born 1989), Spanish footballer

== See also ==
- Manuel Castellanos (disambiguation)
