= Sara Isabel Castellanos Cortés =

Mexican politician

- Born: 7 February 1946 (age 80); Mexico City, Mexico
- Occupation: Politician
- Political party: PVEM

Sara Isabel Castellanos Cortés (born 7 February 1946) is a Mexican politician affiliated with the Ecologist Green Party of Mexico. As of 2014 she served as Senator of the LVIII and LIX Legislatures of the Mexican Congress representing the Federal District and as Deputy of the LX Legislature.
