= Daniel Castellano (journalist) =

Venezuelan journalist, writer and researcher (1972–2026)

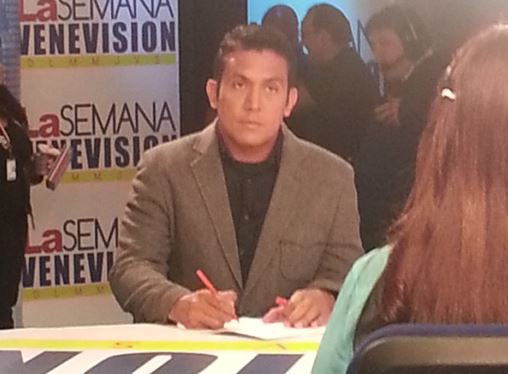
- Castellano in 2014
- Born: 20 November 1972; Baruta, Miranda, Venezuela
- Died: 18 June 2026 (aged 53); Caracas, Venezuela
- Education: Central University of Venezuela
- Occupations: Journalist, writer, researcher

Daniel Alirio Castellano Amarista (20 November 1972 – 18 June 2026) was a Venezuelan journalist, writer and researcher, who reached public notoriety serving for nine years as a reporter and host of opinion talk shows on Venezolana de Televisión for the media coverage he did (for this television broadcast station of the electoral campaign of Manuel Rosales (opposition candidate to the government of Hugo Chávez) and by the publication, during 2015, of his first book The Nutcracker of Vicente Nebrada and the Theatre Teresa Carreño 1996–2015.

== Early life and education ==
Castellano was born in Baruta, Miranda state, now part of the Greater Caracas, in Leopoldo Aguerrevere Clinic. Son of Alirio Castellanos, industrial psychologist and Marisol Amarista, educator, he was the eldest of three siblings: Laura Castellanos (National Prize of Journalism 2001 and current correspondent of CNN in Spanish in Venezuela) and Boris Castellanos (National Prize of Journalism 2012 and current reporter and newscaster of news in Venezolana de Televisión). By typographical error, being registered at birth, his name is Castellano and not Castellanos like the rest of his siblings.

During childhood, his family lived in a populous area of Caracas Capital: Caricuao, while his father combined studies of psychology with police work in the Metropolitan Police and his mother with that as a secretary in a company of domestic gas. Once his parents got their degrees at the Central University of Venezuela and the University Simón Rodríguez, their income improved and the family moved to El Paraiso, a middle-class area of Caracas.

From an early age, Daniel and his siblings were influenced by the academic environment in which their parents constantly studied and read at home late into the night. It was also a custom, to buy every Sunday all the available press and thoroughly review it. Laura Castellanos later commented, as an adult, in an interview with The National in 2009: "No, no one from our family is a journalist, my parents always read the newspaper on Sunday mornings and we got used to that". The three brethren, they even got to draw, weekly, a weekly bulletin and pin informative boards on the walls of their home as part of their children's games.

== Career ==
Upon completion with honors his secondary education at the Liceo de Application Montalban, Castellano began studying Public Accounting in the Central University of Venezuela, while Laura entered a year later at the School of Social communication and Boris to the school of Sociology of the same house of studies. But then, he discovered his true vocation was journalism. From there he became obsessed with the profession and decided to leave Public Accounting. In an interview with The National, Castellano commented: "I, at that time studied accounting, but saw her (Laura) and I loved it. Then Boris, and, finally when I was three semesters to graduate I decided to leave Administration and study Social Communication. I am a journalist due to my sister. "

In this new university period, he stood out for his academic excellence receiving several awards from the hands of Asalia Venegas, who was then, director of the School of Journalism. On 30 January 2004, he graduated as Social Communicator in the promotion “Fifty years of the Great Hall” in second place among 75 graduates after passing the thesis: "Audiovisual Economic Journalism in the Venezuelan Context." He earned his degree in the same academic act that his younger brother, Boris and other journalists Enma Carolina Agurto (Current director of the Presidential Press Office of the Republic) and Evelyn Guarenas (Reporter of Venezolana de Televisión).

== Early career ==
After being summoned by journalist Vladimir Villegas, by then President of Venezolana de Televisión, he joined as a reporter, a week before his graduation ceremony, to cover the Economic Source (the subject of his thesis). Appearing for the first time on screen 23 January 2004, he was later moved to the Political Source after the arrival at the rectory of the television plant journalist Jesús Romero Anselmi also. On 4 March of the same year, he travels to Haiti to cover the aftermath of the coup against President Jean-Bertrand Aristide, being the only Venezuelan television journalist coverage. He assists as part of a humanitarian aid delegation sent by Venezuela and headed by Civil Protection. Castellano produces during their stay in that country his first audiovisual solo program "Haiti in the shadow of the world", the same year he was transferred as a news correspondent in Zulia state where he remained for a year.

As a reporter, Castellano joined the presidential press group. He accompanied, from there, Venezuelan President Hugo Chávez on international tours taking the opportunity to interview, with the passing of the years, presidents like Luiz Inácio Lula da Silva (in Brazil), Ricardo Lagos and Michelle Bachelet (in Chile), Rafael Correa (Ecuador), Nicanor Duarte (Paraguay), José "Pepe" Mujica and Tabaré Vázquez (Uruguay). In 2007, he had an exclusive interview with Evo Morales (Bolivia) from the Palace of Government that was broadcast in a special one-hour show.

== Electoral campaign of 2006 ==
In May 2006, Castellano assumed, on behalf of the state channel, coverage of the propaganda campaigns of Governor of Zulia state Manuel Rosales and of Benjamín Rausseo (comedian known as El Conde del Guacharo) against the president Hugo Chávez (to comply with orders issued by the National Electoral Council for balanced coverage of the electoral process). The comedian withdrew before culminating the contention, so Castellano focused on steps to follow throughout Venezuela the Zulian candidate thus acquired national notoriety. Hugo Chávez had publicly refused to give a televised debate against Rosales so the only contact both political sides had was through the media coverage of Castellano. In one of the acts of Rosales' campaign dubbed as the "Avalanche" on Libertador Avenue in Caracas, the reporter discovers that the candidate is not improvising his speech, but reads covertly from leaves held by one of his daughters. The finding was baptized by partisans to the official candidate as the "La Chuleta Rosales". and was one of the political weapons leveled against the presidential candidate days before the elections. The Zulian opponents criticized him that, unlike Hugo Chávez, seemed not being able to improvise a speech.

During the eight-month campaign, Castellano was attacked several times by supporters of Rosales. In an interview for the national newspaper Últimas Noticias on Sunday 1 July 2007, under the title "Without credibility we cannot convince anyone" reviewed the attacks: "the attacks were outlined: "Castellanos (sic) who has been victim of aggression during demonstrations, was little optimistic about the possibility that comes to recognize that at this time the practice of journalism is in a crisis and corrective measures are taken". The article highlights the position of Castellano on the political situation in the country "Daniel Castellano, a reporter for VTV, regrets that "political polarization is the reason by which it has begun to talk about ethics (...) believes there should reign tolerance and respect for different ideologies and approaches". In August 2007, produces five special programs on the occasion of the 43 years of the television plant, which were also broadcast as micros in the newscast El Noticiero.

== Host on opinion programs ==
Because of the notoriety gained by this news coverage, after the victory of Hugo Chávez, Castellano is designated by the plant to take the lead, personally, several opinion programs alone. He begins with the Saturday show "Bajo la Lupa" and following the exit of journalist Ernesto Villegas from the television station and an end of the show "En Confianza", he is invited to take the morning slot with the program he christened "Despertó Venezuela" which was aired from Monday to Friday for three years. During an official visit to Russia by then president of Venezuela, Hugo Chávez described the program as dynamic and sent greetings to the moderator. Through this space paraded the most important political, cultural, and sports spokesmen of the official sector and became a national reference.

In parallel, Castellano wrote articles as collaborator for the newspapers Últimas Noticias and Diario VEA. Throughout his career he produced and hosted several radio programs among which are "Para Estar Informados" which was broadcast on Circuit Radio Continent from 2005 to 2012. In that same radio broadcast led "Soga y Tranquero" (2011) along with journalist and Venezuelan folk music singer Fabiana Ochoa. In the late CNB Circuit he presented "A Dos Voces" (2007) together with journalist Beatriz Adrián (current Caracol News correspondent in Venezuela). Successively, "Zero Politics" (2008) in the Radial Circuito Triple F, alongside journalist Mayerling Camacho Pérez (Current host of El Noticiero Venevisión) and "Zona de Debate" (2010) the latter aired nationally for a year by fourteen stations of Radio Union Circuit and conducted with his sister Laura Castellanos. The program was national reference and the first and only of Castellanos brothers together.

On 1 May 2011, the show "Despertó Venezuela" conducted by Castellano was taken off the air as part of the restructuring of the news channel's programming. Until 12 February 2012, he served as host of the meridian news broadcast "La Noticia", and, due to the lack of professional proposals on behalf of the plant, on 21 May 2013 he definitively resigned from Venezolana de Televisión, as outlined by the press "for professional and ethical reasons."

== Book on performing arts in Venezuela ==
On 19 December 2015, Castellano named his first book of 176 pages under the title "The Nutcracker of Vicente Nebreda and the Teresa Carreño Theater" published by the Teatro Teresa Carreño Foundation. It is the first book in Venezuela written about the production process of a national ballet. The publication features the prologue of the Venezuelan Prima Ballerina Zhandra Rodriguez and extensive press and television coverage. Days before the christening of the book, Castellano led a forum on the subject accompanied by the renowned journalist ballet source in Venezuela, Teresa Alvarenga. At the time of his death, Castellano was preparing three books: "100 Teresa Carreño Ballet Dancers" a joint research with former ballerina Carmen Sequera (to be baptized on 2 February 2017); "Zhandra Rodriguez. Ballerina of Venezuela" (baptized on 17 March 2017, owing to the 70th anniversary of the ballerina) and his first novel Zhandra (no date yet).

== Death ==
Castellano died in Caracas on 18 June 2026, at the age of 53.

== Prizes and recognitions ==
- 2005: Order San Sebastián (First Class)
- 2007: Metropolitan Prize of Journalism Aníbal Nazoa
- 2009: Regional Prize of Journalism Diego Hurtado.
- 2009: Municipal Order Bishop Ramos de Lora
- 2009: Button of Recognition National Antidrugs Office
- 2009: Button of Honour of the Legislative Council of the Carabobo State
