= Statistica (journal) =

- Discipline: Statistics
- Language: English
- Edited by: Christian Hennig

Publication details
- Former names: Supplemento statistico ai nuovi problemi di Politica, Storia ed Economia
- History: 1931-present
- Publisher: University of Bologna (Italy)
- Frequency: Quarterly
- Open access: Yes
- License: CC-BY

Standard abbreviations
- ISO 4: Statistica

Indexing
- ISSN: 1973-2201
- OCLC no.: 858273714

Links
- Journal homepage; Online access; Online archive

Statistica is a quarterly peer-reviewed open access scientific journal dealing with methodological and technical aspects of statistics and statistical analyses in the various scientific fields.

It was established in 1931 as the Supplemento statistico ai nuovi problemi di Politica, Storia ed Economia (English: Statistical Supplement to the New Problems of Politics, History and Economics) and obtained its current title in 1941. It is published by the University of Bologna and is a historical Italian journal in the field of statistics. The founding editor-in-chief was Paolo Fortunati and Italo Scardovi was editor from 1981 till 2004.

Renowned scholars served for Statistica as members of Scientific Board or as authors of papers. Among them there are Corrado Gini, Bruno De Finetti, Carlo E. Bonferroni, Marcel Fréchet, Samuel Kotz, Camilo Dagum, Estelle Bee Dagum, Italo Scardovi.

== Abstracting and indexing ==
The journal is abstracted and indexed in Web of Science Core Collection – Emerging Sources Citation Index, a Clarivate Analytics database and Repec.
