= Rudolph J. Castellani Jr. =

American pathologist

Rudy J. Castellani Jr is professor of pathology at the University of Maryland in Baltimore, Maryland where he also serves as Director of Neuropathology.
