= Castellani Painter =

Unidentified ancient Greek vase painter

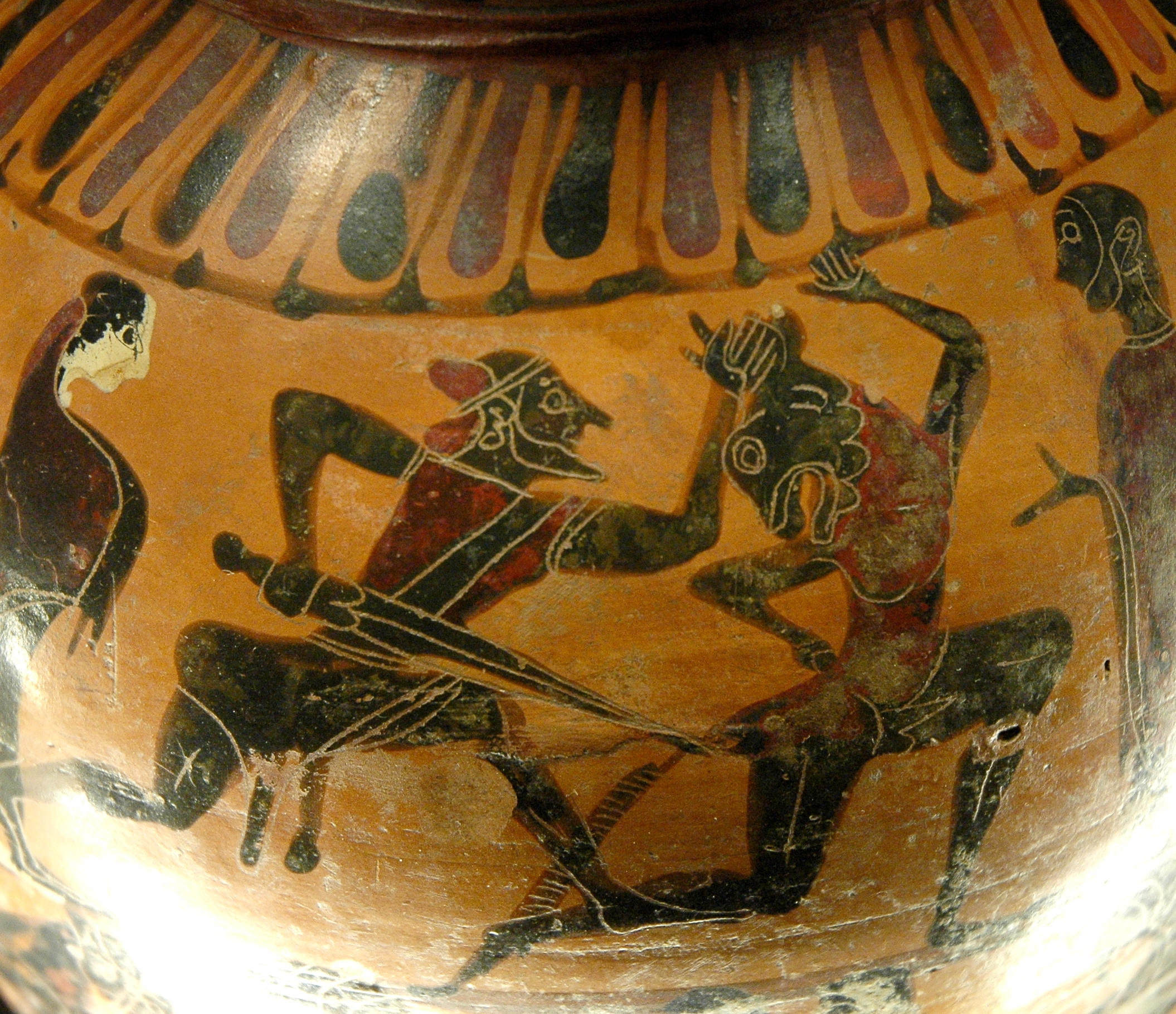
- Theseus killing the Minotaur, by the Castellani Painter, c. 575–550 BC, now in the Louvre.
- Born: Unknown. Named from the Castellani Collection, of which one of his vases was once a part
- Known for: Vase painting
- Movement: Black-figure style

The Castellani Painter was an Attic vase painter of the black-figure style active in the second quarter of the sixth century BC.

The Castellani Painter is especially well known for his drawings on Tyrrhenian amphorae, of which he is considered the most significant painter. His work is distinguished by the use of a vegetal frieze above to animal friezes, as well as by his humorous depictions of large-headed humans and mythical creatures. His conventional name is derived from his name vase, once held in the Castellani Collection.

== See also ==
- List of Greek vase painters

== Bibliography ==
- John Beazley: Attic Black-Figure Vase-Painters, Oxford 1956, p. 94-106.
- John Boardman: Schwarzfigurige Vasen aus Athen. Ein Handbuch, Mainz 1977, ISBN 3-8053-0233-9, p. 41.
- Jeroen Kluiver: The Tyrrhenian Group of Black-figure Vases. From the Athenian Kerameikos to the Tombs of South Etruria, Amsterdam 2003 ISBN 90-72067-10-X
