= Stefano Castellani =

Italian footballer

Personal information
- Date of birth: 16 January 1992 (age 34)
- Place of birth: Florence, Italy
- Height: 1.85 m (6 ft 1 in)
- Position: Forward

Team information
- Current team: Aglianese

Senior career*
Years	Team	Apps	(Gls)
2011–2012	Empoli	2	(0)
2012	Barletta	0	(0)
2013–2015	Empoli	0	(0)
2013–2014	→ Renate (loan)	33	(7)
2014–2015	→ Forlì (loan)	26	(2)
2015	→ Delta Rovigo (loan)	11	(3)
2015–2016	Correggese	15	(1)
2016–2017	Sanremese	34	(7)
2017	Folgore Caratese	11	(1)
2017–2018	Scandicci	19	(8)
2018	San Donato Tavarnelle	1	(0)
2018	Forlì	13	(1)
2018–2019	San Donato Tavarnelle	16	(3)
2019–	Aglianese	0	(0)
- * Club domestic league appearances and goals as of 00:09, 9 August 2019 (UTC)

Stefano Castellani (born 16 January 1992) is an Italian footballer who plays as a forward for Aglianese.

== Career ==
On 17 August 2013 Castellani was signed by Renate.

Ahead of the 2019/20 season, Castellani joined Aglianese.
