= Teo Castellanos =

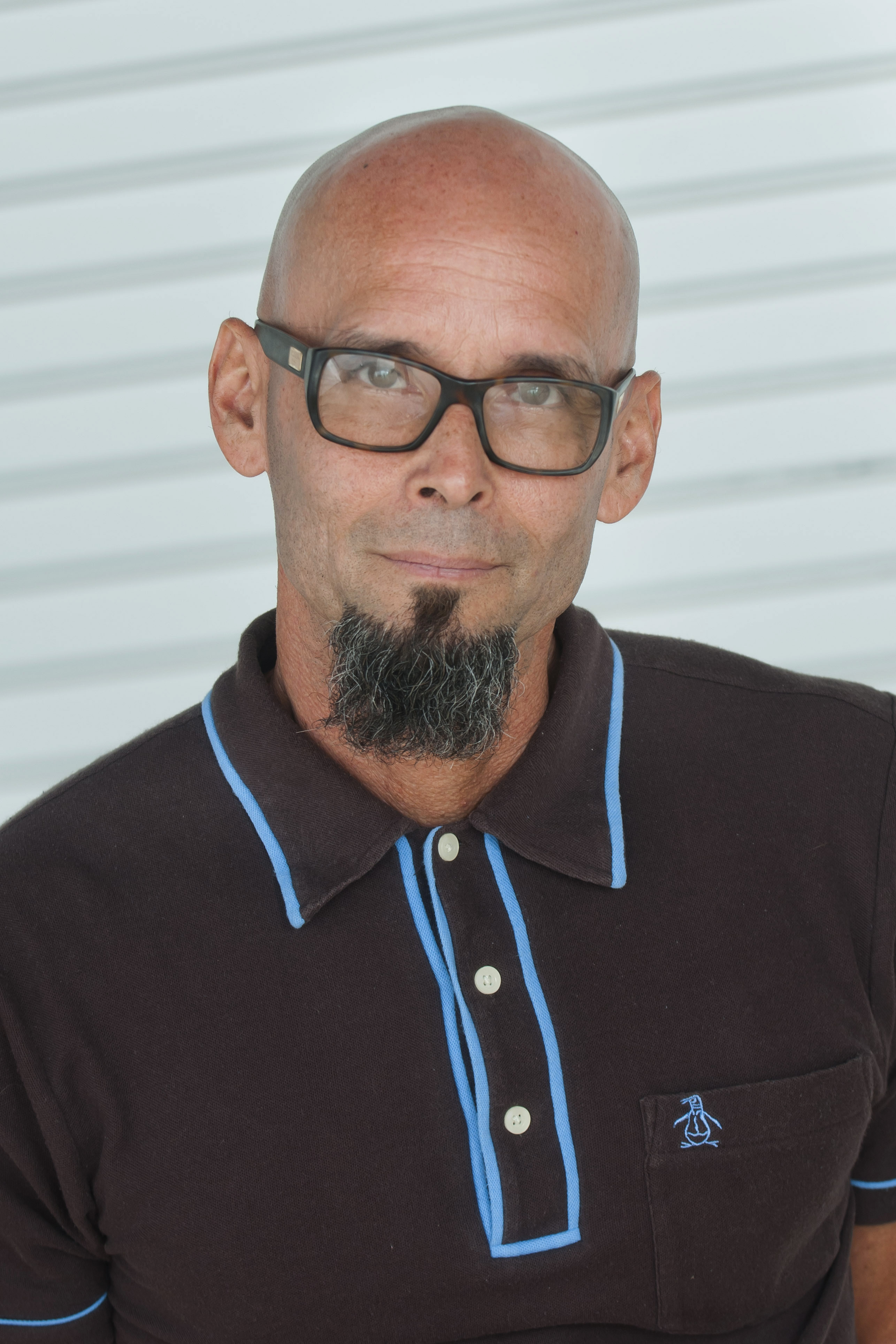
Castellanos in 2013

Teo Castellanos is the founder and Artistic Director of D-Projects, a contemporary Dance/Theater company. D-Projects original work fuses world culture, religion and music, examining social issues through performance. D-Projects has toured South America and China and in 2011 toured in the U.S. with Scratch & Burn, a peace ritual, based on the war and funeral rituals of the Zulu tribe of South Africa using elements of Butoh, Maori war dance, Tibetan Buddhism, Yoruba chants and hip-hop vocabulary.

== Biography ==
Born in Puerto Rico and raised in Miami, Teo Castellanos is an actor/writer/director who works in theater, film and television. Teo received his B.F.A. in Theater from Florida Atlantic University under a full scholarship where he studied with four time Tony Award winner Zoe Caldwell. He is author of War, Revolution, and the Projects, a one-man trilogy, which he has toured on the East Coast, as well as his one-man show NE 2nd Avenue based on Miami characters, which was commissioned and produced by Miami Light Project as part of their 2001-2002 Contemporary Performance Series and went on to be produced by Coconut Grove Playhouse in Miami. Teo Castellanos’ NE 2nd Avenue was awarded the International Cultural Exchange Grant by Miami-Dade County Cultural Affairs, which allowed Teo to bring it to the 2003 Edinburgh Fringe Festival where it won the Fringe First Award, the most prestigious theater award of the festival (past winners include Emma Thompson, Rowan Atkinson and Danny Hoch). It was also nominated for a South Florida Carbonell Award for Best New Work and was awarded Best Solo Performance by Miami New Times, and Best Original Play by Miami Beach Sun Post and has toured throughout the U.S and Europe. City Link Magazine also awarded Teo Playwright of the Year 2006. Teo has lectured and taught theater workshops at Temple University, University of Massachusetts, Saint Michaels College, Santa Fe College, University of South Florida, Florida Memorial University and Miami- Dade College as well as throughout several states and the U.S. Virgin Islands. Teo is currently director of RAP (Rites And Passages) a men’s prison theater/drumming program at ArtSpring, and Executive Producer of Miami Project Hip Hop (MPH), an annual event produced by Miami Light Project that honors Hip Hop roots and aesthetics. He is co-coach of the Tigertail Productions Spoken Word Team that competes annually at Brave New Voices, a national competition produced by Youth Speaks. Teo is the recipient of the State of Florida Individual Artist Fellowship 2005. He is a former member of the men of color theater collective, The Hittite Empire, based in Los Angeles, with which he has toured in the U.S. and England. He also toured Cuba as part of the Parece Blanca cast, a theater production that brought together for the first time in history Cuban artists in exile to work with artists living on the island to form a unified cast. He is a member of The Screen Actors Guild and is Associate Member of Society of Stage Directors and Choreographers, and is represented in Europe by Universal Arts. His big screen work includes acting opposite John Leguizamo in the 2005 film Empire. Teo is also a Mime & Movement instructor at Mater Academy Charter High.

== Works ==
=== Directing ===
Year	Title	Venue
2007	Shine (excerpts)	APAP Showcase Alvin Ailey Studio NYC
2007	Insanity Isn’t	Miami Light Project
2005	Scratch & Burn	Byron Carlyle Theater
1998	Counting Trucks	Summer Shorts/City Theatre
1996	Ogun: Iron, Conflict, & Creativity	South Florida Arts Center
1995	Getting Real in the Galleries	Osolo Theatre, Sarasota, FL
1994	Once Removed	Key West Theatre Festiva
1994	Popa Dio!	Orlando International Theatre Festival
1993	Dreams of Home	Florida Atlantic Studio Theatre
1992	The Promise	Pawley Theatre
1991	Short Eyes	Pawley Theatre

=== Acting Film/Television ===
Year	Title	Role
2007	Burn Notice	Cartel Operative
2006	Full Grown Men	Rommel
2005	Empire	Raul
1999	Sins of the City	Ronnie Mendez
1999	Zero	Police Officer
1998	The S Club 7	Tony DeWitt
1996	Anatomia de un Addicto	Drug Dealer
1995	Infinite Finite	Nikolaj
1994	Beat the Street	Narrator
1994	Pointman	Bartender
1994	John Koelsch	P.O.W.
1993	Kyoko	Rafa
1992	Bound	Transvestite
1991	Gentleman in Black	Cash
1991	Ben and Walter	Walter
