= Manuel Castellanos López =

Manuel Castellanos López (born May 29, 1949) is a Cuban graphic artist.

== Biography ==
He was born in Sancti Spíritus, Las Villas, Cuba, on May 29, 1949. From 1965 to 1970 he studied in Escuela Nacional de Arte (ENA), La Habana, Cuba. He was a teacher at the Escuela Nacional de Arte up to 1979.

== Individual exhibitions ==
Among his personal exhibitions can be included "Son como son" Galeria de La Habana, Havana, 1976. In 1977, Lopez also presented "Dibujos de Castellanos" Pequeño Salón, Museo Nacional de Bellas Artes, Havana. In 1979, he exhibited his works "Dibujos y grabados de Manuel Castellanos". Pequeño Salón, Museo Nacional de Bellas Artes, Havana, Cuba and "Dibujos de Castellanos", Mexico.

== Collective exhibitions ==
In 1971 he participated in the X "Premi Internacional Dibuix Joan Miró". Collegi d’Arquitectes. Catalunya i Balears, Barcelona/Girona, Spain. In 1975 presented some of his works in the "Third Triennale India" 1975. Lalit Kala Akademi, Rabindra Bhavan, New Delhi, India. In 1977 his works took part of the "Bienal de Ilustraciones de Bratislava BIB’77" Bratislava, Czechoslovakia. In 1982 was part of the XL "Biennale di Venezia", Italy, and in 1984 as part of 1st. Havana Biennial, Museo Nacional de Bellas Artes, Havana, Cuba.

== Awards ==
He has been awarded with several distinctions during his life, as an example we can mention the First Prize in Drawing category and the Second Prize of Engraving in the "Salón Nacional de Profesores e Instructores de Artes Plásticas", Museo Nacional de Bellas Artes, Havana, 1973. In 1977 he was recognized with the "Mention of Honor". Bienal de Ilustraciones BIB’77, Bratislava, Czechoslovakia.

== Collections ==
In Cuba his works can be found in relevant collections such as National Library José Martí, Havana; Casa de Las Américas, Havana. We can also found them in Museo Nacional de Bellas Artes, Havana, and in Taller Experimental de Gráfica (TEG), Havana, Cuba.
