= IEEE Transactions on Dielectrics and Electrical Insulation =

- Discipline: Dielectric phenomena and diagnostics, insulation
- Language: English
- Edited by: Michael Wübbenhorst

Publication details
- Former name: IEEE Transactions on Electrical Insulation (1965-1993)
- History: 1965-present
- Publisher: Institute of Electrical and Electronics Engineers
- Frequency: Bimonthly
- Impact factor: 3.1 (2022)

Standard abbreviations
- ISO 4: IEEE Trans. Dielectr. Electr. Insul.

Indexing
- ISSN: 1070-9878 (print); 1558-4135 (web)
- LCCN: 94648211
- OCLC no.: 60639338

Links
- Journal homepage; Online access; Online archive

IEEE Transactions on Dielectrics and Electrical Insulation is a peer-reviewed scientific journal published bimonthly by the Institute of Electrical and Electronics Engineers. It was co-founded in 1965 by the IEEE Dielectrics and Electrical Insulation Society under the name IEEE Transactions on Electrical Insulation. The journal covers the advances in dielectric phenomena and measurements, and electrical insulation. Its editor-in-chief is Michael Wübbenhorst (KU Leuven).

According to the Journal Citation Reports, the journal has a 2022 impact factor of 3.1.
