= List of active ships of the Colombian Navy =

Colombian Navy Armada de la República de Colombia
- Coat of Arms of the Colombian Navy
- Active: September 17, 1810 - Present
- Country: Colombia
- Branch: Navy
- Role: Protection of the seas and rivers of Colombia
- Garrison/HQ: Colombian Ministry of Defense
- Motto: Plus Ultra (Latin: further beyond)

In addition to the usual tasks of a green water navy, the Colombian Navy (Spanish: Armada de la República de Colombia - "ARC") also performs coast guard duties, has shared responsibility for patrolling the extensive Colombian network of rivers, and includes the Marine Infantry (IM). Furthermore, its littoral/riverine component is relatively large when compared with the more traditional navies of other countries.
Due to this aggregation of duties, some vessels perform routinely and indistinctly as coast guard/combat patrol, particularly those mid-size, lightly armed vessels, and can occasionally be found classified as either Surface combat or Coast Guard or even Logistics/General transport across different sources, even in official documents from the ARC itself. Also, many of the lighter patrol/harbor patrol boats may be assigned or reassigned duties across the different branches with little or no notice depending on service needs.
As the ARC has embarked in a program of modernization since 2000, a better separation and categorization of the different vessels has ensued, with many vessels being re-numbered or reclassified, which makes for occasionally conflicting references. This article tries to use the latest denominations whenever possible, but there may still be overlaps.

== Key ==
The tables below use the following key:

Key	Description
Role	The general role performed by the vessel; In most cases this matches with a standard type, however there are cases where the ARC may use a previously owned vessel from a specific type in a different role
Group	The general group classification used by the ARC, this matches in most cases with the formal class of the vessel, and it is used in its pennant number in the case of major units; note that the ARC may group multiple vessels of different formal classes under a single group
Class	The formal class of the vessel, when known or identifiable
Name	Vessel name when formally assigned; does not apply to many light boats known only by its number or callcode
Number	Hull number
Construction	Country of builder
Commission	Commission date; full date if known, or at least year of commission in the ARC
Notes	additional comments, references and/or links related to the vessel

== Oceanic combat ==
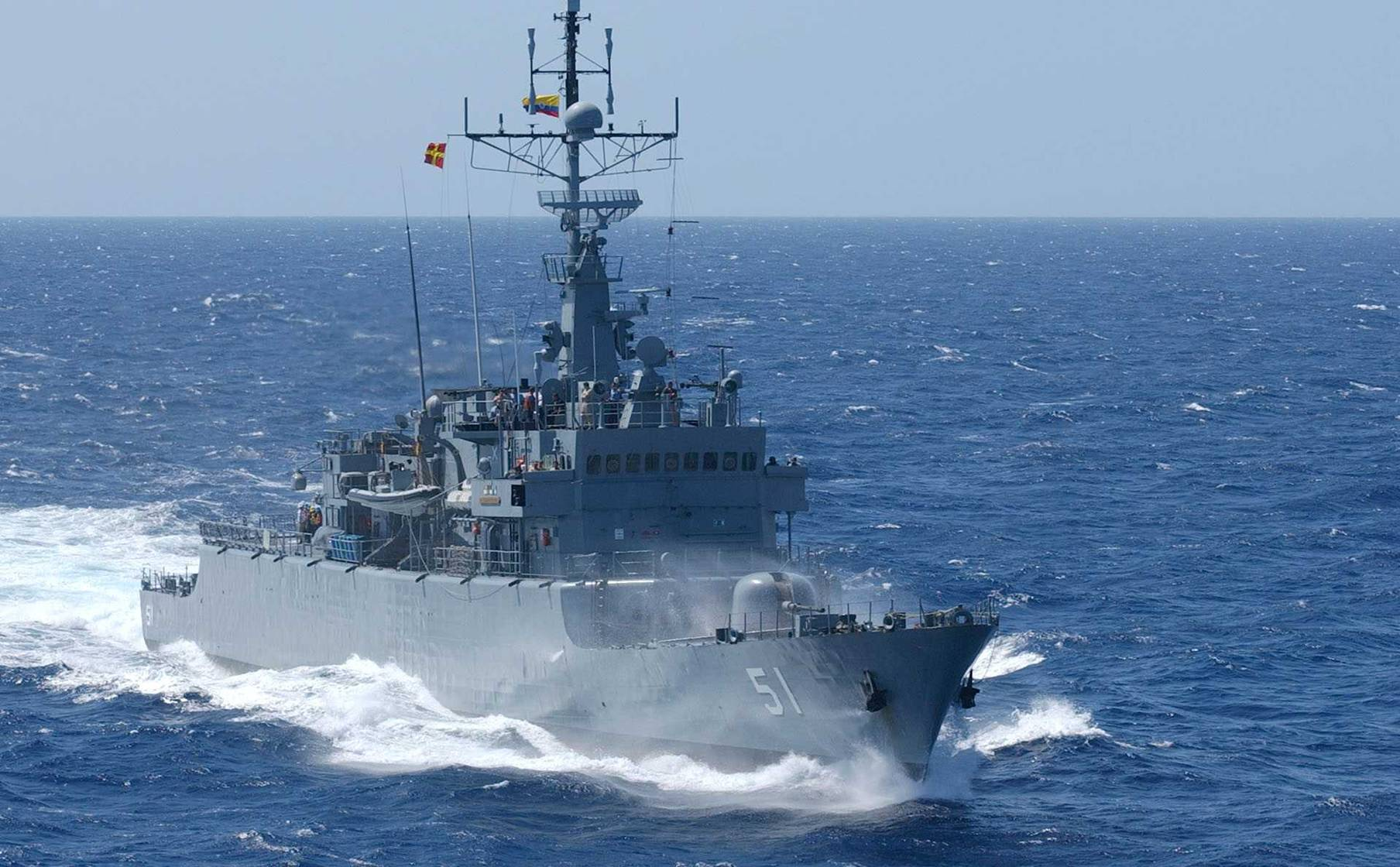
ARC Almirante Padilla (FM-51)

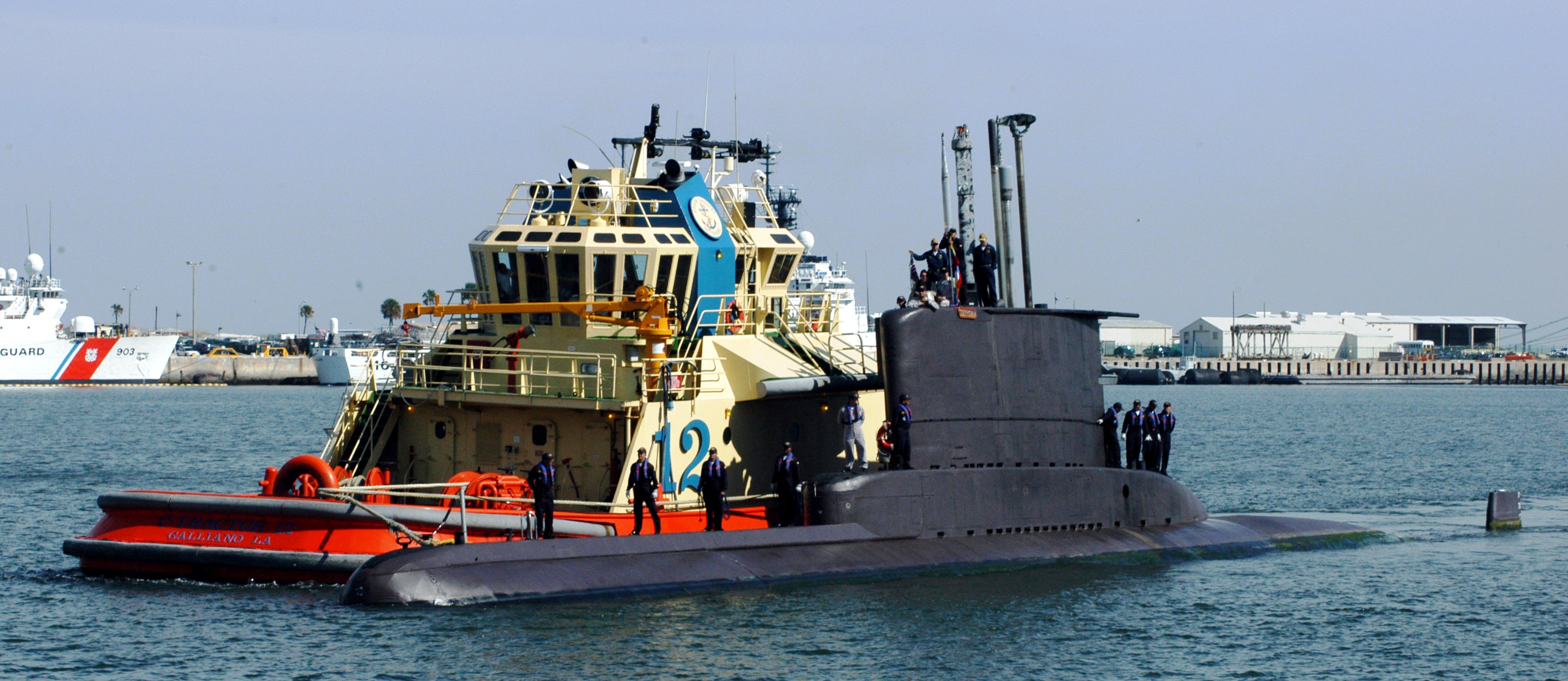
Colombian Navy submarine ARC Tayrona enters Mayport Basin, US during a visit sponsored by U.S. Naval Forces Southern Command (NAVSO)

Role	Group	Class	Ship Name	Number	Construction	Commission	Notes
Frigate							
Frigate	FM	SIGMA10514					FM: Ocean Going Frigate, build by Cotecmar based on Damen SIGMA10514
Frigate	FM	SIGMA10514	ARC Almirante Padilla	FM-?1	Colombia	2026–2030	
Frigate	FM	SIGMA10514	ARC Caldas	FM-?2	Colombia	2031–2033	
Frigate	FM	SIGMA10514	ARC Antioquia	FM-?3	Colombia	2034–2036	
Frigate	FM	SIGMA10514	ARC Independiente	FM-?4	Colombia	2037–2039	
Frigate	FM	SIGMA10514	ARC TBD	FM-?5	Colombia	2040–2042	
Frigate	FM	Almirante Padilla					FM: Missile frigate (Spanish: Fragata Misilera; Hull type (FS1500)
Frigate	FM	Almirante Padilla	ARC Almirante Padilla	FM-51	Germany	31 October 1983	Completed upgrade January 2012, will be replaced by SIGMA10514
Frigate	FM	Almirante Padilla	ARC Caldas	FM-52	Germany	12 February 1984	Will be replaced by SIGMA10514
Frigate	FM	Almirante Padilla	ARC Antioquia	FM-53	Germany	30 April 1984	Will be replaced by SIGMA10514
Frigate	FM	Almirante Padilla	ARC Independiente	FM-54	Germany	27 July 1984	Will be replaced by SIGMA10514
Corvette	CM	Donghae	ARC Nariño	CM-55	South Korea	7 August 2014	
Corvette	CM	Pohang	ARC Almirante Tono	CM-56	South Korea	7 August 2020	
Offshore Patrol							Offshore Patrol Vessels -Heavy (longer range/endurance); Note that the different navies allocate the OPV role either under coastguard or oceanic combat; in the Colombian Navy these ships have been assigned to oceanic combat units and not to the Coastguard Command
Offshore Patrol	PZE						Also called PZE or PZEE (Spanish: Patrullero de Zona Economica Exclusiva), Exclusive Economic Zone patrol boat
Offshore Patrol	PZE	Fassmer-80	ARC 20 de Julio	PZE-46	Germany; Colombia	3 February 2012	First of its class, built at Cotecmar shipyards, Cartagena de Indias, Colombia with a slightly modified design based on a license of the Fassmer OPV-80, of 6 planned.
Offshore Patrol	PZE	Fassmer-80	ARC 7 de Agosto	PZE-47	Colombia	7 September 2013	
Offshore Patrol	PZE	Fassmer-80	ARC Santander	PZE-48	Colombia	1 December 2016	
Submarine							
Submarine	SO	Type 209/1200					SO: Oceanic Submarine (Spanish: Submarino Oceánico);
Submarine	SO	Type 209/1200	ARC Pijao	SO-28	Germany	14 April 1975	
Submarine	SO	Type 209/1200	ARC Tayrona	SO-29	Germany	18 July 1975	
Submarine	SO	Type 206					ST: Oceanic Submarine (Spanish: Submarino Oceánico)
Submarine	SO	Type 206	ARC Intrépido	SO-23	Germany	December 2015	
Submarine	SO	Type 206	ARC Indomable	SO-24	Germany	December 2015	
Swimmer Delivery Vehicle	LS	Tactical Chariot					LS: Submarine boat (Spanish: Lancha Submarina)
	LS	CosMoS CE2F	ARC Defensora				
	LS	CosMoS CE2F	ARC Protectora				
	LS	CosMoS CE2F	ARC Poderosa				3/4 remain in service

== Littoral / Riverine service ==
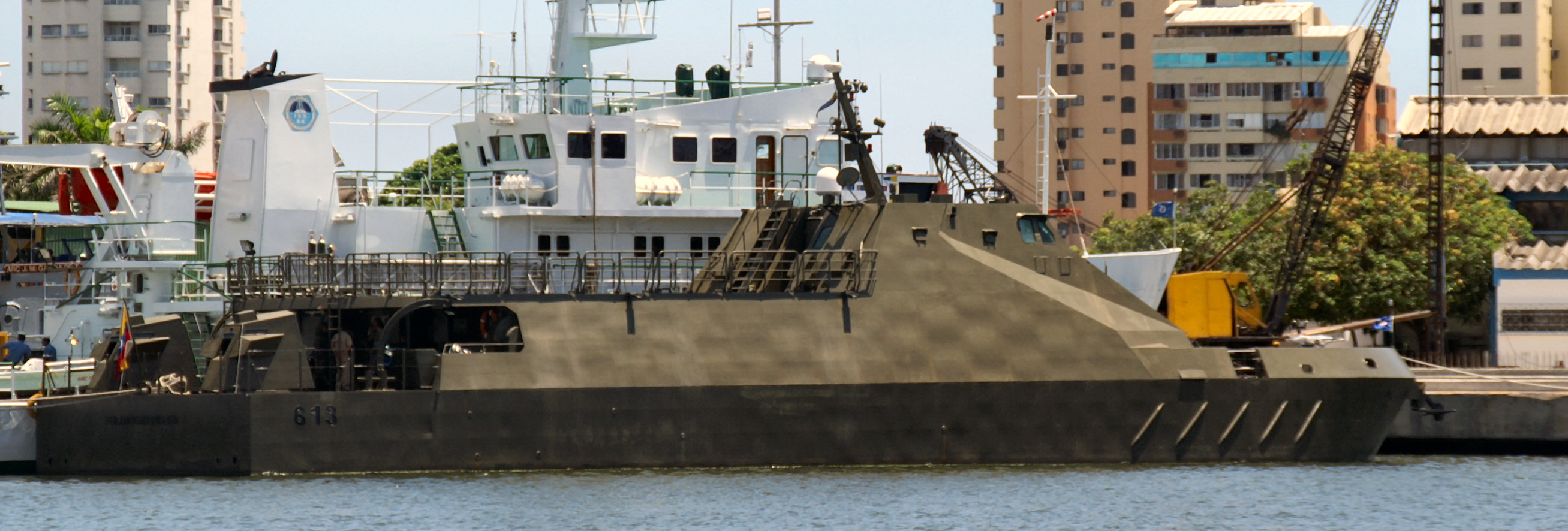
ARC Juan Ricardo Oyola Vera in Cartagena

Role	Group	Class	Name	Number	Construction	Commission	Notes
Patrol - Heavy							
Patrol - Heavy	CF						CF: Riverine Gunboat (Spanish: Cañonera Fluvial)
Patrol - Heavy	CF	Riohacha					Heavy (170 ton) patrol gunboat class; originally built by Astilleros Unión Industrial de Barranquilla, Colombia in 1956
Patrol - Heavy	CF	Riohacha	ARC Riohacha	CF-135	Colombia	1956	
Patrol - Heavy	CF	Riohacha	ARC Leticia	CF-136	Colombia	1956	Disarmed and reconfigured as Hospital ship
Patrol - Heavy	CF	Riohacha	ARC Arauca	CF-137	Colombia	1956	As of 2005, assigned to the Putumayo area, Riverine Fleet South Command(Spanish: Comando Flota Fluvial del Sur)
Patrol - Heavy	NF						The NF (Spanish: Nodriza Fluvial) group consists of a progressively improved series of boats, known as "Nodrizas" ("mothership") for armored patrol, support & re-provisioning of smaller piranha-class boats deployed from and around them. The first group of these, classified here as generic Nodriza Fluvial include a motley mix of older gunboats or armored tugs. These boats, reconditioned in their new standardized role, provided the foundations during the late 1990s and 2000s for the R&D of the PAF-series boats, for which the PAF-IV is the current state-of-the art showcase.
Patrol - Heavy	NF	Riverine Mothership	ARC CP. Filigonio Hichamon	NF-601	Colombia		
Patrol - Heavy	NF	Riverine Mothership	ARC SSIM. Manuel Antonio Moyar	NF-602	Colombia		
Patrol - Heavy	NF	Riverine Mothership	ARC Igaraparaná	NF-603	Colombia		
Patrol - Heavy	NF	Riverine Mothership	ARC SSIM. Julio Correa Hernández	NF-604	Colombia		
Patrol - Heavy	NF	Riverine Mothership	ARC Manacacias	NF-605	Colombia		
Patrol - Heavy	NF	Riverine Mothership	ARC Cotuhe	NF-606	Colombia		
Patrol - Heavy	NF	Riverine Mothership	ARC Ariari	NF-609	Colombia		
Patrol - Heavy	NF	PAF-I					
Patrol - Heavy	NF	PAF-I	ARC SSCIM. Senen Alberto Araújo	NF-607	Colombia		
Patrol - Heavy	NF	PAF-I	ARC CPCIM. Guillermo Londoño Vargas	NF-608	Colombia		
Patrol - Heavy	NF	PAF-II					
Patrol - Heavy	NF	PAF-II	ARC TNCIM. Mario Alonso Villegas	NF-610	Colombia		
Patrol - Heavy	NF	PAF-III					
Patrol - Heavy	NF	PAF-III	ARC TECIM Tony Pastrana Contreras	NF-611	Colombia	2004	
Patrol - Heavy	NF	PAF-III	ARC CTCMI Jorge Moreno Salazar	NF-612	Colombia	2005	
Patrol - Heavy	NF	PAF-IV					
Patrol - Heavy	NF	PAF-IV	ARC TEFIM Juan Ricardo Oyola Vera	NF-613	Colombia	2006	
Patrol - Heavy	NF	PAF-IV	ARC TECIM Freddy Alexander Pérez Rodríguez	NF-614	Colombia	2008	
Patrol - Heavy	NF	PAF-IV	ARC TECIM Edic Cristian Reyes Holguín	NF-615	Colombia	2009	
Patrol - Medium							
Patrol - Medium	PRF						PRF: Fast Riverine patrol (Spanish: Patrullera Rápida Fluvial)
Patrol - Medium	PRF	Tenerife					40 ft. Patrol Boat River (PBR)
Patrol - Medium	PRF	Tenerife	ARC Tenerife	PRF-305	United States	1993	fmr. LR-181
Patrol - Medium	PRF	Tenerife	ARC Tarapacá	PRF-306	United States	1993	fmr. LR-182
Patrol - Medium	PRF	Tenerife	ARC Mompox	PRF-307	United States	1993	fmr. LR-183
Patrol - Medium	PRF	Tenerife	ARC Orocué	PRF-308	United States	1993	fmr. LR-184
Patrol - Medium	PRF	Tenerife	ARC Calamar	PRF-309	United States	1993	fmr. LR-185
Patrol - Medium	PRF	Tenerife	ARC Magangué	PRF-310	United States	1993	fmr. LR-186
Patrol - Medium	PRF	Tenerife	ARC Monclart	PRF-311	United States	1993	fmr. LR-187
Patrol - Medium	PRF	Tenerife	ARC Caucaya	PRF-312	United States	1993	fmr. LR-188
Patrol - Medium	PRF	Tenerife	ARC Mitú	PRF-313	United States	1993	fmr. LR-189
Patrol - Medium	PRF	Magdalena					32 ft. Patrol Boat River (PBR) Mk.II
Patrol - Medium	PRF	Magdalena	ARC Magdalena	PRF-176	United States	1989	fmr. LR-176; ex- US Navy, hull #31RP6886
Patrol - Medium	PRF	Magdalena	ARC Cauca	PRF-177	United States	1989	fmr. LR-177; ex- US Navy, hull #31RP7121
Patrol - Medium	PRF	Magdalena	ARC Atrato	PRF-178	United States	1989	fmr. LR-178; ex- US Navy, hull #31RP7128
Patrol - Medium	PRF	Magdalena	ARC Sinú	PRF-179	United States	1989	fmr. LR-179; ex- US Navy, hull #31RP7129
Patrol - Medium	PRF	Magdalena	ARC San Jorge	PRF-180	United States	1989	fmr. LR-180; ex- US Navy, hull #31RP7130
Patrol - Medium	PRF	Magdalena	ARC Putumayo	PRF-190	United States	1993	fmr. LR-190; acquired new
Patrol - Medium	PRF	Magdalena	ARC Caquetá	PRF-191	United States	1993	fmr. LR-191; acquired new
Patrol - Medium	PRF	Magdalena	ARC Orinoco	PRF-192	United States	1993	fmr. LR-192; acquired new
Patrol - Medium	PRF	Magdalena	ARC Orteguaza	PRF-193	United States	1993	fmr. LR-193; acquired new
Patrol - Medium	PRF	Magdalena	ARC Vichada	PRF-194	United States	1993	fmr. LR-194; acquired new
Patrol - Medium	PRF	Magdalena	ARC Guaviare	PRF-195	United States	1993	fmr. LR-195; acquired new
Patrol - Medium	PRF	Diligente					These are slightly different boats from a similar series. Built in the Astilleros Navales de Cartagena in 1952–54, deactivated in mid-80s, reactivated from storage in mid-1990s for littoral/riverine patrol and interdiction.
Patrol - Medium	PRF	Diligente	ARC Diligente	PRF-121	Colombia	1952–54;1995	fmr. LR-121
Patrol - Medium	PRF	Diligente	ARC TE Juan Lucio	PRF-122	Colombia	1952–54;1995	fmr. LR-122
Patrol - Medium	PRF	Diligente	ARC CD Alfonso Vargas	PRF-123	Colombia	1952–54;1995	fmr. LR-123
Patrol - Medium	PRF	Diligente	ARC CP Fritz Hagale	PRF-124	Colombia	1952–54;1995	fmr. LR-124
Patrol - Medium	PRF	Diligente	ARC Vengadora	PRF-125	Colombia	1952–54;1995	fmr. LR-125
Patrol - Medium	PRF	Diligente	ARC Humberto Cortés	PRF-126	Colombia	1952–54;1995	fmr. LR-126
Patrol - Medium	PRF	Diligente	ARC Calibío	PRF-127	Colombia	1952–54;1995	fmr. LR-127
Patrol - Medium	PRF	Diligente	ARC Carlos Galindo	PRF-128	Colombia	1952–54;1995	fmr. LR-128
Patrol - Medium	PRF	Diligente	ARC Valerosa	PRF-129	Colombia	1952–54;1995	fmr. LR-129
Patrol - Medium	PRF	Diligente	ARC Luchadora	PRF-130	Colombia	1952–54;1995	fmr. LR-130
Patrol - Light							
Patrol - Light		PAF-L					The PAF-L class (Patrullera Fluvial Ligera (in Spanish)) is an entirely new development, which takes the experiences of the heavy PAF-I-IV class and defines a lighter patrol boat.
Patrol - Light		PAF-L	-pending-		Colombia		-pending-
Patrol - Light		LPR-40					The "LPR-40" (Lancha Patrullera de Rio (in Spanish) – 40 ft.) is a new and native development, which draws on the experience of the US PBR-40 boats as well as the PAF and PAF-L series to provide a midsize, light and fast boat with a strong punch.
Patrol - Light	PAF	LPR-40	ARC Río Sinú		Colombia	2016	acquired new
Combat Fast Boats							These are light, fast combat patrol boats usually of fiberglass reinforced construction, outboard dual engines and fitted with additional communications and electronics. It is common for these boats to be deployed and supported from one of the larger CF/NF class vessels. As of 2003, judging by the pennant/hull numbers, there was an estimated number of 167: BC-1000 to BC-1041 (41) and BT-1100 to BT-1226 (126). However, a firm number is difficult to establish due to combat and service losses, some hulls may have been rebuilt locally, as well as it is likely additional batches have been acquired, and/or added to via configuration of locally built hulls with foreign-bought higher-end components.
Combat Fast Boats	BC/BCFC						BC: Command Boat (Spanish: Bote de Comando) also known as BCFC: Riverine Combat Command Boat (Spanish: Bote de Combate Fluvial de Comando)
Combat Fast Boats	BC/BCFC	Anguila	multiple boats		United States; Colombia	1993–present	22 ft. Patrol Boat, Boston Whaler-style. As of 2003, est. number: 41
Combat Fast Boats	BT/BCFT						BT: Tactical Boat (Spanish: Bote Táctico) also known as BCFT: Riverine Combat Tactical Boat (Spanish: Bote de Combate Fluvial Táctico)
Combat Fast Boats	BT/BCFT	Piranha	multiple boats		United States; Colombia	1991–present	22 ft. Patrol Boat, Boston Whaler-style. Multiple batches acquired (1,1990; 3,1991; 51, 1993; 78, 1997);, from Boston Whaler, Mass, and Edgewater, Fla.; As of 2003, est. number: 126

== Coast Guard ==
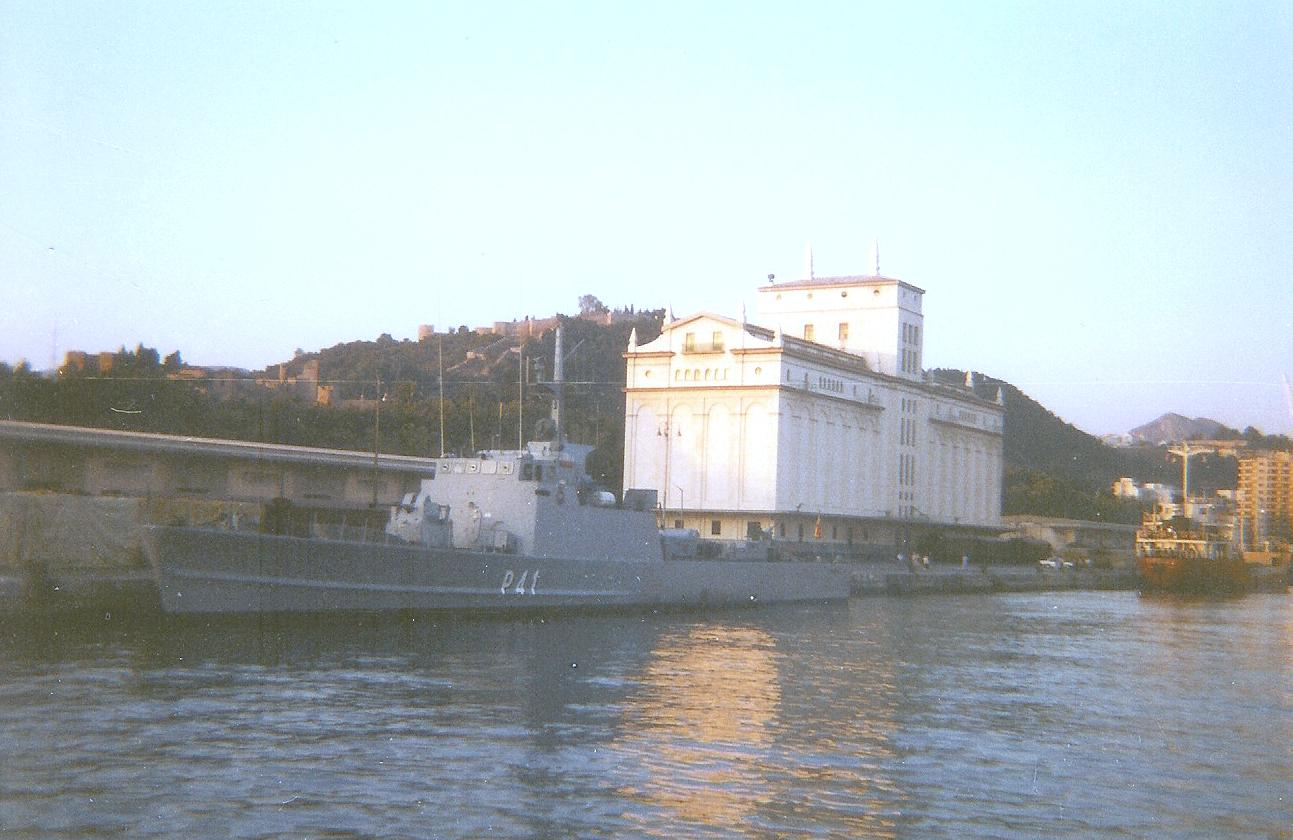
ARC Espartana (PO-41), photo taken at the time of its service as Patrol Boat Cormorán (P-41) of the Spanish Navy

Role	Group	Class	Ship Name	Pennant Number	Construction	Commission Date	Notes (Note: Note that the roles Offshore patrol vs. Coastal patrol are not uniformly defined across different navies. For the purposes of this table, the OPV-heavy vessel is considered the heavier and more oceanic role, drawing the line arbitrarily at a displacement of 500 tonnes vs. the CPV-medium. Nevertheless, many CPV vessels are capable of oceanic navigation within reason, and OPV vessels are also routinely used in coastal patrol missions.)
Offshore							Offshore Patrol Vessels -Heavy (longer range/endurance)
Offshore	PO						PO: Oceanic Patrol (Spanish: Patrullero Oceánico)
Offshore	PO	Reliance	ARC Valle del Cauca	PO-44	United States	2003	fmr. USCGC Durable (WMEC-628)
Offshore	PO	180-A	ARC San Andrés	PO-45	United States	15 October 2007	fmr. USCGC Gentian (WLB-290)
Offshore	PO	Asheville	ARC Albuquerque	PO-111	United States	1983	fmr. USS Welch (PGM-93). Leased in 1983, formally acquired by Colombia in 1995 and transferred to CG service.
Offshore	PO	Toledo	ARC Jose Maria García y Toledo	PO-113	United States	1994	
Offshore	PO	Toledo	ARC Juan Nepomuceno Eslava	PO-114	United States	13 May 1994	
Coastal							Coast Patrol Vessels - Medium (shorter range/endurance)
Coastal	PC						PC: Coastal Patrol (Spanish: Patrullero Costero)
Coastal	PC	Point	ARC Cabo Corrientes	PC-141	United States	2000	fmr. USCGC Point Wells
Coastal	PC	Point	ARC Cabo Tiburon	PC-143	United States	2001	fmr. USGCG Point Estero
Coastal	PC	Point	ARC Cabo de la Vela	PC-144	United States	2001	fmr. USCGC Point Sal
Coastal	PC	CPV-40	ARC 11 de Noviembre	PC-145	Germany	2011	
Coastal	PC	CPV-46	ARC Punta Espada	PC-146	Colombia	2014	
Coastal	PC	CPV-46	ARC Punta Ardita	PC-147	South Korea	2014	
Coastal	PC	CPV-46	ARC Punta Soldado	PC-148	South Korea	2014	
Coastal	PC	Island	ARC Batalla Toma de Sabanilla		United States	2025	
Coastal	PC	Island	ARC Batalla de Cispatá		United States	2025	
Coastal	PC	Island	ARC Batalla Noche de San Juan		United States	2025	
Coastal	PM						PM: Sea Patrol (Spanish: Patrullero de Mar)
Coastal	PM	Swiftships 105	ARC Rafael del Castillo y Rada	PM-102	United States	1994	
Coastal	PM	Swiftships 110	ARC José María Palas	PM-103	United States		
Coastal	PM	Swiftships 110	ARC Medardo Monzón Coronado	PM-104	United States		
Coastal	PM	Sea Spectre Mk III	ARC Sgto 2do Jaime Gómez Castro	PM-105	United States		
Coastal	PM	Sea Spectre Mk III	ARC Juan Nepomuceno Peña	PM-106	United States		
Light patrol	BP						The ARC has regrouped and renamed a few different classifications of light, fast boats into a single, more generic 'BP' denomination. These include from the usual light outboard harbor patrol boat, Boston-Whaler style, up to a few Midnight Express go-fast type boats used for interdiction. The exact number is difficult to determine, but judging from hull numbers, as of 2007, there were 77, from BP-421 to BP-498. It is expected that additional boats have been added.
Light patrol	BP	Langostera	multiple boats		United States; Colombia	1991–present	Est. number: 15
Light patrol	BP	Delfin	multiple boats		United States; Colombia	1991–present	Est. number: 20
Light patrol	BP	Orca	multiple boats		United States; Colombia	1991–present	Est. number: 15
Light patrol	BP	Interceptora	multiple boats		United States; Colombia	1991–present	Est. number: 13
Light patrol	BP	Midnight Express	multiple boats		United States; Colombia	1991–present	Est. number: 10
Light patrol	BP	Go-fast	multiple boats		United States; Colombia	1991–present	Est. number: 4

== Training, auxiliary and logistics ==
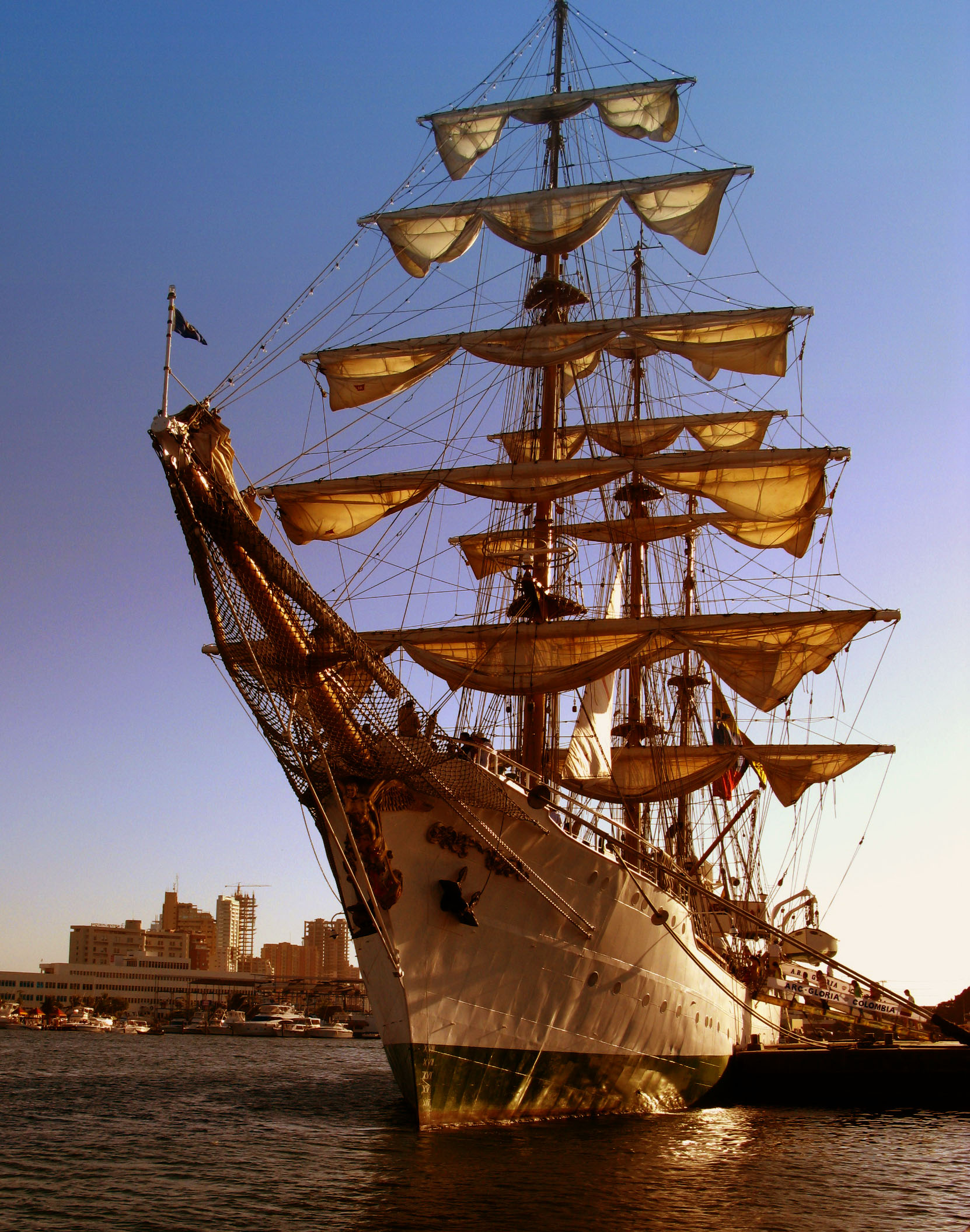
ARC Gloria anchored at Cartagena

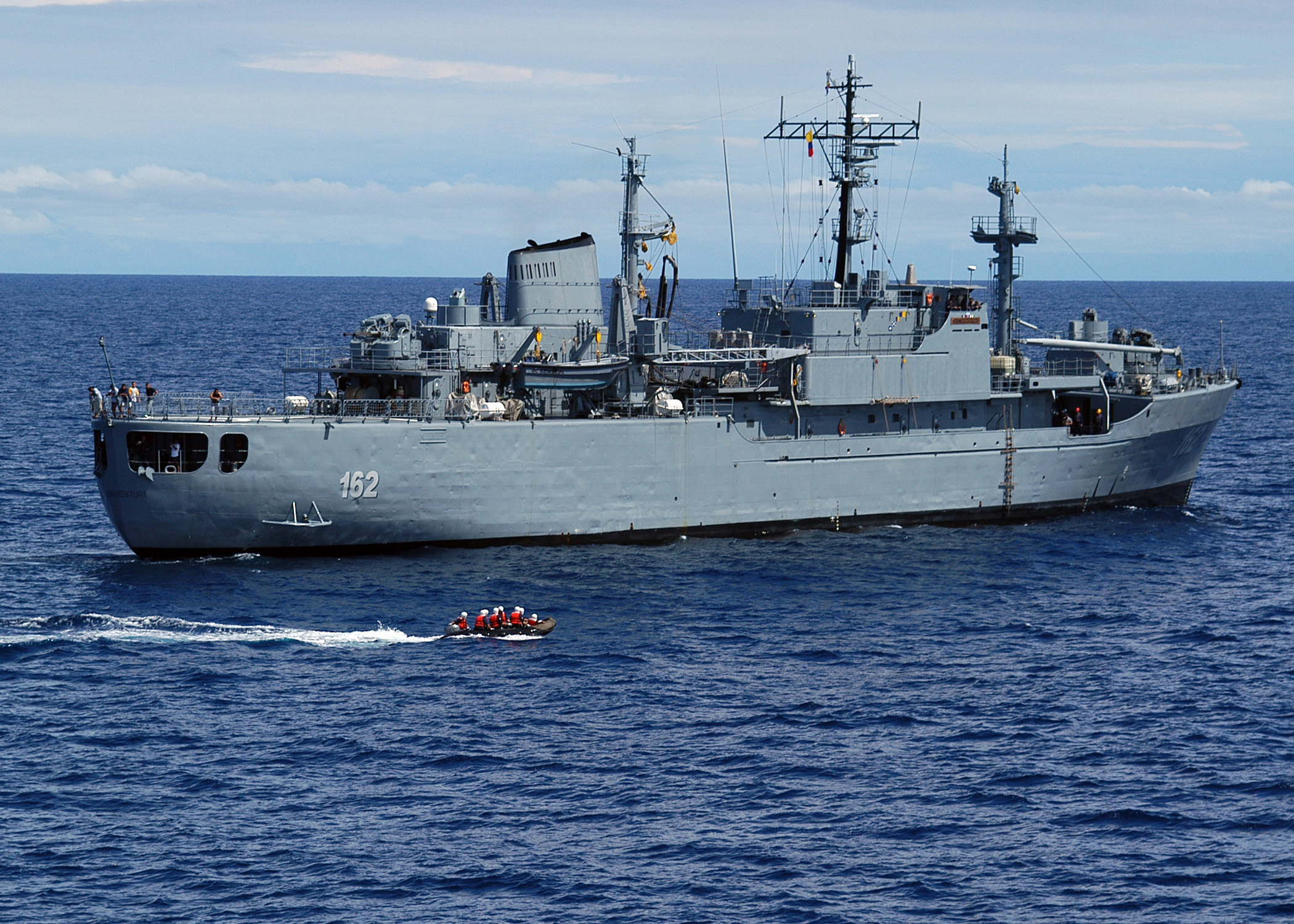
ARC Buenaventura during exercise "Fuerzas Aliadas PANAMAX 2007"

Role	Group	Class	Ship Name	Pennant Number	Construction	Commission Date	Notes
Training							
Training	BE						BE: School Vessel (Spanish: Buque Escuela)
Training	BE	Barque	ARC Gloria	160	Spain	1968	Flagship of the ARC
Training	YT						YT: Yacht Training, encompasses a series of small and medium vessels used for basic seamanship training.
Training	YT		ARC Comodoro	230			
Training	YT		ARC Tridente	231			
Training	YT		ARC Cristina	232			
Training	YT		ARC Albatros	233			Ex-Caribbean Queen
Training	YT		ARC Poseidon	234			
Training	YT		ARC Atenea	235			Kawasaki 440; Ex-Saskia
Training	YT		ARC Cronos	236			Catamaran; Ex-Imagine
Training	BI						BI: Instruction Boat (Spanish: Bote Instrucción). These include typically 3 main types of light boats, plus some other devices. As of 2007, judging from hull numbers, there were apx 34, from BI-01 to BI-45 (some gaps in the numbering). It is possible a few additional boats have been added in this class, but likely not many as there have not been any known major changes in the navy training programs recently.
Training	BI	whaler	multiple boats		United States; Colombia		~22 ft. Patrol Boats, Boston Whaler-style; Est. number: 15
Training	BI	laser	multiple boats		United States; Colombia		Est. number: 10
Training	BI	glider	multiple boats		United States; Colombia		Est. number: 4
Training	BI	jetski	multiple boats		United States; Colombia		Est. number: 4
Logistics							
Logistics	BL						BL: Multipurpose Logistical (Spanish: Buque Logístico Multipropósito)
Logistics	BL	Lüneburg - Type 701	ARC Cartagena de Indias	161	Germany	1996	fmr. Deutschemarine A1411 "Lüneburg"
Logistics	BL	Lüneburg - Type 701	ARC Buenaventura	162	Germany	1996	fmr. Deutschemarine A1416 "Nienburg"
Logistics	BO						BO class, Oceanographic Vessel (Buque Oceanográfico (in Spanish))
Logistics	BO		ARC Providencia	155			
Logistics	BO		ARC Malpelo	156			
Logistics	BH						BH class, Hydrographic Vessel (Buque Hidrográfico (in Spanish))
Logistics	BH		ARC Caribe	152	China	2018	Multipurpose offshore supply vessel
Logistics	BB						BB class, Buoy Tender (Buque Balizador (in Spanish))
Logistics	BB		ARC Gorgona	31			
Logistics	BB		ARC Abadia Mendez	33			
Logistics	BB		ARC Ciénaga De Mallorquin	34			
Logistics	BB		ARC Isla Palma	35			
Logistics	RM						RM: Sea tugboat (Spanish: Remolcador de Mar)
Logistics	RM		ARC Pascual de Andagoya	75			
Logistics	RB						RB: Bay tugboat (Spanish: Remolcador de Bahía)
Logistics	RB		ARC S1. Josué Alvarez	76			
Logistics	RB		ARC Don Vizo	77			
Logistics	RB		ARC Portete	78			
Logistics	RB		ARC Maldonado	79			
Logistics	RB		ARC Ciénaga de San Juan	80			
Logistics	DF						DF: Floating Dock (Spanish: Dique Flotante)
Logistics	DF		ARC Mayor Jaime Arias	170			
Logistics	LD						LD:Landing Craft (Spanish: Lancha de Desembarco)
Logistics	LD	LCM-8	ARC Bahia Sapzurro	240			Confirmed as late as of 2005, unconfirmed as of 2007, current status unknown, presumed active.
Logistics	LD	LCM-8	ARC Bahia Humboldt	241			Ex- LCM-7512
Logistics	LD		ARC Bahia Octavia	242			Confirmed as late as of 2005, unconfirmed as of 2007, current status unknown, presumed active.
Logistics	LD	LCU-1466	ARC Golfo de Morrosquillo	246			Ex- LCU-1591
Logistics	LD	LCU-1466	ARC Bahia Honda	248			Ex- LCU-1543
Logistics	LD	LCU-1466	ARC Bahia Portete	249			Ex LCU-1592
Logistics	LD	LCU-1466	ARC Bahia Cupica	252			
Logistics	LD	LCU-1466	ARC Bahia Utria	253			
Logistics	LD	LCU-1466	ARC Bahia Malaga	254			
Auxiliary							
Auxiliary	ETG						ETG: General transport vessel (Spanish: Embarcaciones de Transporte General). Light and medium-sized boats used for internal transport and service to larger vessels.
Auxiliary	ETG		ARC Bocachica	501			
Auxiliary	ETG		ARC Arturus	502			Fishing boat
Auxiliary	ETG		ARC Pedro David Salas	503			Yacht
Auxiliary	ETG		ARC Sirius	504			
Auxiliary	ETG		ARC Calima	507			Ex-Northern Edge
Auxiliary	ETG		ARC Bahia Santa Catalina	508			
Auxiliary	ETG		ARC Movil I	509			
Auxiliary	ETG		ARC Sula	510		2006	Fishing boat; Ex-Movil II/ Rosa Ma.; Per, assigned to CG service with Coast Guard Pacific (CGAPO), but formally classified as ETG.;
Auxiliary	ETG		ARC Playa Blanca	542			Ex-Point After
Auxiliary	ETG		ARC Tierra Bomba	543			
Auxiliary	ETG		ARC Bell Salter	544			
Auxiliary	ETG		ARC Orion	546			Fiskar
Auxiliary	ETG		ARC Pegasso	547			Fiskar
Auxiliary	ETG		ARC Armada 1	557			Yate; Ex-Andrea Juliana
Auxiliary	ETG		ARC Juanchaco	558			Yate; Ex-Isla Barú
Auxiliary	ETG		ARC Libertad	559			Yate;; Ex-La Nota
Auxiliary	BA						BA: Administrative Boat (Spanish: Bote Administrativo). These include different types of light fiberglass-outboards, a few nonstandard or civilian recreation types and even some boats confiscated from drug interdiction operations and assigned to the ARC after the final legal disposition. The exact number is difficult to determine, but judging from hull numbers as of 2007, there were apx 35, from BA-03 to BA-31 + about a dozen or so ex-drug interdiction waiting to be formally given hull numbers. It is possible some more boats have been added in this class, but likely not many as there haven't been major known changes in naval bases or posts recently.
Auxiliary	BA	Langostera	multiple boats		United States; Colombia		Est. number: 7
Auxiliary	BA	Recreational	multiple boats/types				Est. number: 10
Auxiliary	BA	Taxi boat	multiple boats		United States; Colombia		Est. number: 10
Auxiliary	BA	(other)	multiple boats				Est. number: 10
Auxiliary	BM						BM: Multipurpose boat (Spanish: Bote Multipropósito) encompasses some unique utilitary platforms, barges and flatboats, also called "naval artifacts" (Spanish: Artefacto Naval)
Auxiliary	BM		ARC Bongo Bocagrande		Colombia		BMP_1501 .
Auxiliary	BM		ARC Bongo U726		Colombia		
Auxiliary	BM		ARC Bongo Draga Don Vizo		Colombia		AN_1701 .
Auxiliary	BM		ARC Bongo Martinete I		Colombia		AN_1702 .
Auxiliary	BM		ARC Bongo Martinete II		Colombia		AN_1703 .
