= ARC 7 de Agosto =

Two ships in the Colombian Navy have been named 7 de Agosto (7 August), a reference to Battle of Boyacá Day, which commemorated the Battle of Boyacá, a major battle during the campaigns to free South America from Spanish rule. The two ships are:

- ARC 7 de Agosto (D-06), a destroyer launched in 1956
- ARC 7 de Agosto (PZE-47), a patrol vessel laid down in 2013
