= Science and technology in Colombia =

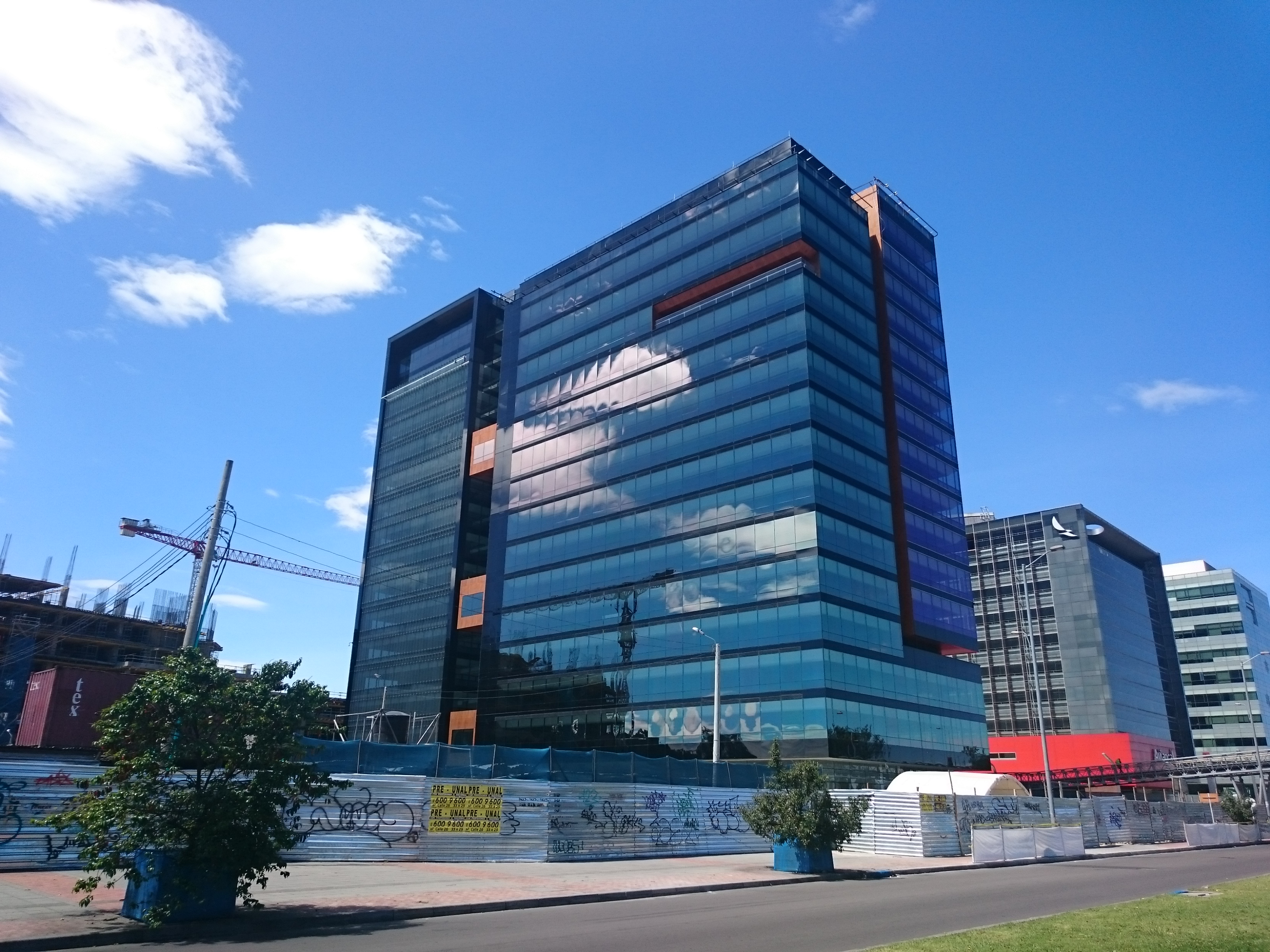
COLCIENCIAS is a Colombian Government agency that supports fundamental and applied research.

Science and technology in Colombia refers to the development of scientific research and technological innovation in Colombia, and how these in turn affect Colombian society, politics, and culture. Colciencias is a government agency that supports fundamental and applied research in Colombia.

== Research groups in science and technology ==
Colombia has more than 3,950 research groups in science and technology. Colombia was ranked 71st in the Global Innovation Index in 2025.

iNNpulsa, a government body that promotes entrepreneurship and innovation in the country, provides grants to startups, in addition to other services it and institutions provide. Co-working spaces have arisen to serve as communities for startups large and small. Organizations such as the Corporation for Biological Research (CIB) for the support of young people interested in scientific work has been successfully developed in Colombia. The International Center for Tropical Agriculture based in Colombia investigates the increasing challenge of global warming and food security.

Some leading Colombian scientists are Joseph M. Tohme, researcher recognized for his work on the genetic diversity of food, Manuel Elkin Patarroyo who is known for his groundbreaking work on synthetic vaccines for malaria, Francisco Lopera who discovered the "Paisa Mutation" or a type of early-onset Alzheimer's, Rodolfo Llinás known for his study of the intrinsic neurons properties and the theory of a syndrome that had changed the way of understanding the functioning of the brain, Jairo Quiroga Puello recognized for his studies on the characterization of synthetic substances which can be used to fight fungus, tumors, tuberculosis and even some viruses and Ángela Restrepo who established accurate diagnoses and treatments to combat the effects of a disease caused by the Paracoccidioides brasiliensis, among other scientists.

== Aerospace ==
Colombia is seventh of the eight Latin American countries to have satellites in orbit. On April 7, 2007 Libertad I (CubeSat), was sent from Baikonur cosmodrome, to orbit around the planet offering telemetry information and as a research purpose. It represents a milestone in the history of Colombia and the first step of the Colombian aerospace development.

== Aeronautic ==
With the establishment in Colombia of the Aeroleaver factory more than 50 years ago, and with a joint effort of the government, it was managed to develop the first Colombian airship, completely with Colombian technology and elaborated in the country, the "Sparrowhawk". At the moment Armed Forces of Colombia uses some of these airplanes, and others are of commercial use.

Colombia also builds a completely new version of Lancair Legacy aircraft for its Air Force. This is the first aircraft to be made in Colombia by the government and serves as trainer aircraft.

== Naval ==
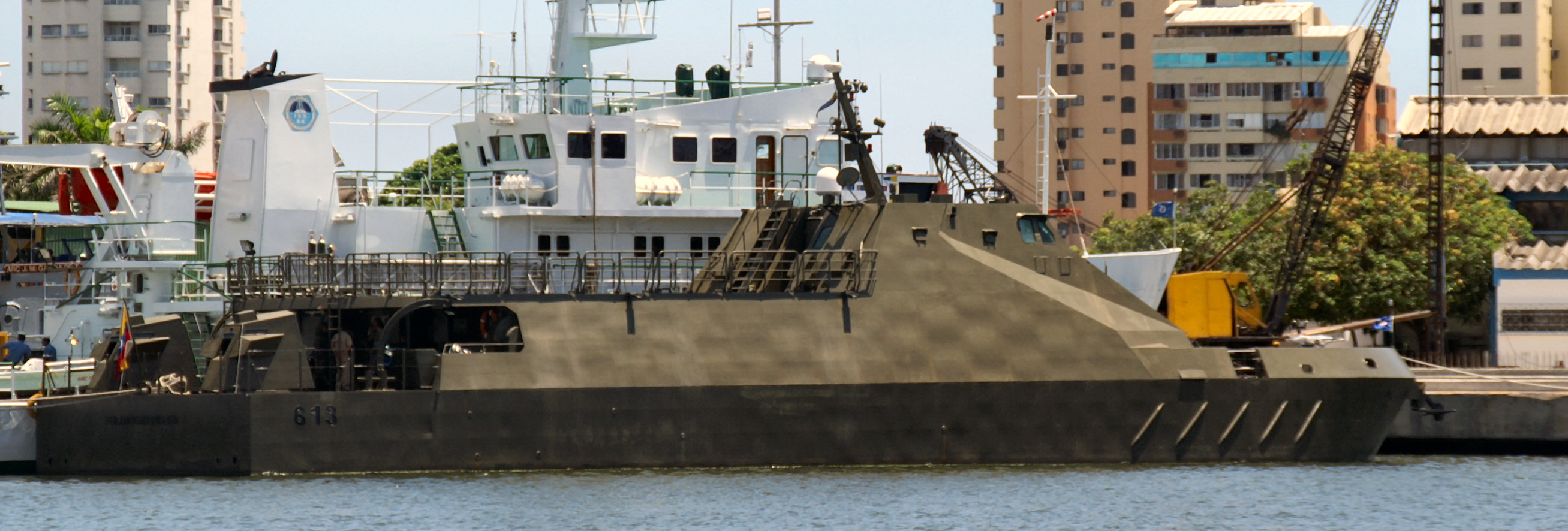
ARC TF Juan Ricardo Oyola Vera anchored in Cartagena.

Colombia has one of the largest if not the largest Shipyards in Latin America located in Cartagena. It produces Fluvial Support Patrol Ships, like the ARC TF Juan Ricardo Oyola Vera which were developed by Cotecmar Co. These ships are intended to patrol rivers and littoral waters and features a helicopter deck.

== Nuclear ==
The IAN-R1, which was donated by the United States and is currently located in Bogota, is a small nuclear reactor that was reactivated recently after being inactive for a few years. The IAN-R1 is used for research purposes. This reactor is used in the production of neutrons and every year it provides 4,400 samples for analysis. The electricity production in Colombia comes mainly from renewable energy sources. 69.97% is obtained from the hydroelectric generation. Colombia's commitment to renewable energy was recognized in the 2014 Global Green Economy Index (GGEI), ranking among the top 10 nations in the world in terms of greening efficiency sectors.

== Health ==
As of 2007 Colombian medicine has been recognized as one of the most advanced in the world. The refractive surgery keratomileusis was developed by Ignacio Barraquer in 1964 in Bogotá. On January 10, 1985, Dr. Elkin Lucena performed the first successful In vitro fertilization, which allowed the birth of the first Latin American test tube baby Carolina Mendez. On December 14, 1985, the Dr. Alberto Villegas performed the first heart transplant in Latin America to Antonio Yepes.

On May 20, 1994 Manuel Elkin Patarroyo received the Prince of Asturias Awards by his technical and scientific research in the development of synthetic malaria vaccine. Dr. Jorge Reynolds Pombo is credited with having helped in the design of the first successful internal pacemaker in 1958.

Colombia ranks 22nd on the World Health Organization’s list of the best healthcare systems. Health standards in Colombia have improved very much since the 1980s, healthcare reforms have led to massive improvements in the healthcare systems of the country. Although this new system has widened population coverage by the social and health security system from 21% (pre-1993) to 96% in 2012, health disparities persist.

A study conducted by América Economía magazine ranked 21 Colombian health care institutions among the top 44 in Latin America, amounting to 48 percent of the total. A cancer research and treatment centre was declared as a Project of National Strategic Interest.

== Military technology ==
Colombia has begun to innovate in military technology for its army and other armies of the world; especially in the design and creation of personal ballistic protection products, military hardware, military robots, bombs, simulators and radar.

== Overview of science and technology policy, 2015–2019 ==
Peace deal fostering sustainable development .,Colombia’s economy slowed at the end of the commodities boom in 2014. Although the drop in demand was partly offset by domestic consumption and investment levels, the growing imbalance between exports and imports still eroded GDP.

Accession to the OECD in May 2018 should help Colombia to boost its exports. By 2018, growth had rebounded to 2.5% then 3.3% in 2019. The most momentous event in Colombia’s recent history has been the signing of a peace agreement between the government and the Revolutionary Armed Forces of Colombia–People’s Army (FARC–EP) that was ratified by parliament in 2016. This agreement will contribute to the fulfilment of the SDGs, through the following initiatives:

- Science and ICTs for Peace, developed by Colciencias together with the Ministry of Information Technologies and Communication, seeks to promote innovative solutions for the victims of the armed conflict.
- The Colombia Bio programme promotes the conservation, management and sustainable use of biodiversity in Colombian territories; the project was initially led by Colciencias, in partnership with national and regional institutions.

By the end of 2019, 22 bio-expeditions had been undertaken in different regions as part of Colombia Bio, to enrich the scant taxonomic record. Colombia Bio is supporting bioprospecting to foster the development of products and services with high added value. It is also analysing the entire value chain as a preamble to making recommendations for how to mainstream the sustainable use of biodiversity at the institutional level. In parallel, the project is striving to develop a ‘biodiversity culture’ to ensure popular support for the conservation and sustainable use of biodiversity.

In 2019, the government created the Ministry of Science, Technology and Innovation to replace Colciencias. Colciencias had been in charge of policy-making and evaluation. Since it had also fulfilled the vital role of implementation agency, the ministry established an autonomous unit in December 2019 in charge of implementation. In 2020, the government was contemplating establishing an independent implementation agency.

The new ministry has taken over all of Colciencias’ portfolios, including those mentioned above and the Health Research Fund (FIS). The latter is a sectoral fund benefiting from a permanent source of income in the form of government revenue from casinos and lotteries.

Regional pacts targeting equity Colombia’s modest research intensity has slipped further since 2015 but numbers of researchers are on the rise. Although these dual trends have reduced the amount of funding per researcher, the country’s scientific output actually grew by 52% over the 2015–2019 period.

The National Development Plan 2018–2022: Pact for Colombia, Pact for Equity is structured by regional ‘pacts’ that seek to nurture the strengths of each region. These pacts are essentially cross-cutting agreements on strategic issues that include sustainability, peacebuilding, digital transformation, decentralization and STI. All the pacts are aligned with, or at least related to, the Sustainable Development Goals.

In December 2019, the International Mission of the Wise established by the government delivered its final report on how to place knowledge at the heart of Colombia’s sustainable development. The report made recommendations on three key topics: biodiversity; productive sustainable development; and social equity. It also recommended raising domestic investment in R&D.

== See also ==
- Spanish language in science and technology

== Sources ==
This article incorporates text from a free content work. Licensed under CC BY-SA 3.0 IGO Text taken from UNESCO Science Report: the Race Against Time for Smarter Development, Gabriela Dutrénit, Carlos Aguirre-Bastos, Martín Puchet and Mónica Salazar, UNESCO. To learn how to add open license text to Wikipedia articles, please see this how-to page. For information on reusing text from Wikipedia, please see the terms of use.
