= OPV-80-class patrol vessel =

Offshore patrol vessels operated by the Chilean and Colombian Navies

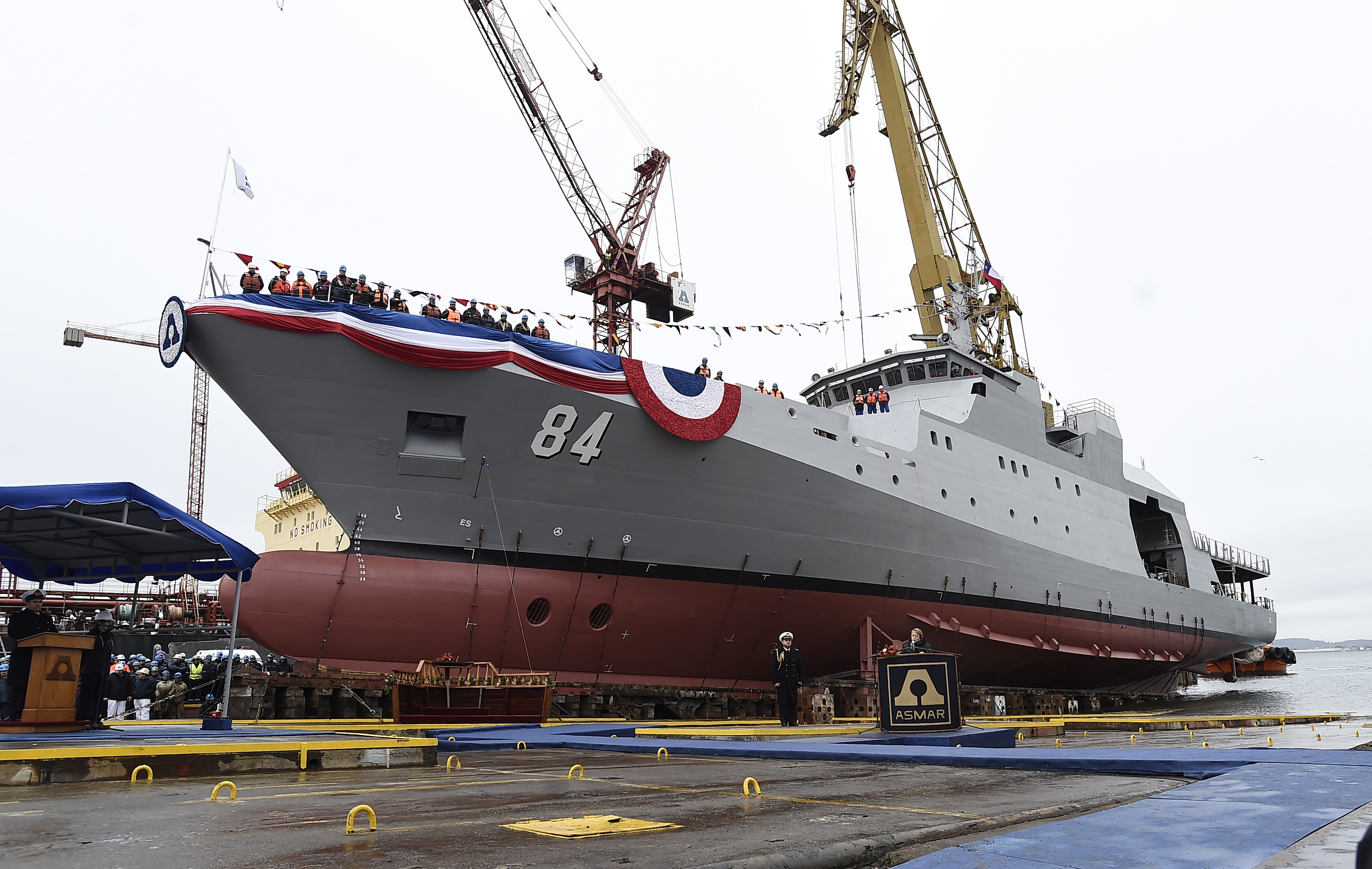
- Cabo Odger

Class overview
- Builders: ASMAR; COTECMAR
- Operators: Chilean Navy; Colombian National Navy
- Planned: 7
- Completed: 7
- Active: 7

General characteristics
- Type: Offshore patrol vessel
- Displacement: 1,728–1,850 tons
- Length: 80.6 m (264 ft 5 in)
- Beam: 13 m (42 ft 8 in)
- Propulsion: 2 × Wärtsilä 12V26 – output of 4,080 kW (5,470 hp) each at 1000 rpm; CPP 4D775 with Lipstronic Advanced 7000 control system; Wärtsilä reduction gearbox SCV 62; 3 × Caterpillar 3412C 435 kVA at 1500 rpm; 1 × Caterpillar 3056 105 kVA at 1500 rpm; 2 × type MD stern shaft seals; 2 × bow thrusters, 200 kW (270 hp)
- Speed: Maximum: 22 knots (41 km/h; 25 mph)
- Range: 8,600 nmi (15,900 km; 9,900 mi) at 12 knots (22 km/h; 14 mph)
- Complement: 30, up to 60
- Sensors & processing systems: Fire Control System: DESA ARIES; Navigation: Sperry Marine VisionMaster FT Integrated Bridge System (IBS); Radars: 2 × Sperry Marine BridgeMaster E X-band radars; 1 × Sperry Marine BridgeMaster E S-band radar
- Armament: Guns: 40 mm/70 medium-calibre (A position); 2 × 12.7 mm guns (B position)
- Aircraft carried: Chile: 1 × AS.365 Dauphin N2; Colombia: 1 × Bo 105
- Aviation facilities: Hangar for a medium size helicopter

The OPV-80 class is a class of offshore patrol vessels that are currently operated by the Chilean Navy and Colombian National Navy. The Argentine Navy have also expressed an interest in building these ships.

== History ==
The design of the PZM was developed by Fassmer GmbH & Co. KG, a German company to meet the Chilean Navy's requirements under the Danubio IV project. The contract for ASMAR to build the PZMs was signed on May 20, 2005, with Northrop Grumman, Sisdef (a consortium of BAE Systems and shipbuilder ASMAR) and Rohde & Schwarz participating as main subcontractors at a cost of US$54 million to be commissioned by 2012. The vessels are operated by the Coast Guard Service of the Chilean Navy and they will conduct patrol missions in Chile's exclusive economic zone (EEZ). The design of the Proyecto Patrulleros de Zona Marítima is being promoted by Chile as a common platform for South American navies through the Proyecto Patrullero de Alta Mar Regional (or Regional Offshore Patrol Ship) committee.

=== Colombia ===
Colombia ordered three vessels to be built at its COTECMAR shipyard in Cartagena, out of six planned until 2020.

== Ships in class ==
Name	Pennant	Laid down	Launched	Commissioned
Chilean Navy
Piloto Pardo	81		17 June 2007	13 June 2008
Comandante Policarpo Toro	82		15 October 2008	30 July 2009
Marinero Fuentealba	83	13 July 2012	3 April 2014	6 November 2014
Cabo Odger	84	2 July 2015	3 August 2016	10 August 2017
Colombian National Navy
ARC 20 de Julio	46		24 July 2010	20 July 2012
ARC 7 de Agosto	47	14 April 2012	4 September 2013	18 March 2014
ARC Victoria	48		28 December 2014	8 July 2017

== See also ==
- POVZEE
- BVL
- Viana do Castelo-class patrol vessel
- Arafura-class offshore patrol vessel

== Bibliography ==
- Scheina, Robert L. & Smigielski, Adam (1995). "Columbia". In Chumbley, Stephen (ed.). Conway's All the World's Fighting Ships, 1947–1995 (revised ed.). Naval Institute Press. pp. 68–70. ISBN 1-55750-132-7.
