= Naval Battle of the Han River (1951) =

Korean war battle between Australian and Chinese forces

- Part of the Korean War
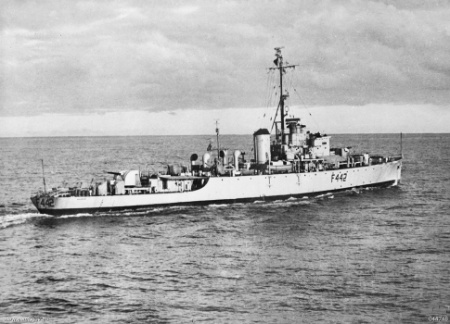
- HMAS Murchison operating off Korea.
Date	28–30 September 1951
Location	Han River, South Korea
Result	Australian tactical victory

Belligerents
Australia	China

Commanders and leaders
(Australia) Allen Nelson Dollard	Unknown

Strength
1 frigate	Infantry shore batteries

Casualties and losses
4 wounded 1 frigate moderately damaged	~40 killed several shore batteries destroyed

The Naval Battle of the Han River (28–30 September 1951) was fought during the Korean War. The main fighting occurred after an Australian frigate was attacked by communist Chinese forces while transiting the Han River in Korea. Up until that time United Nations (UN) warships had operated on the river with only limited Chinese resistance. Following the engagement UN naval forces continued to operate on the Han, although riverine operations were suspended two months later. Four Australians were wounded during the engagement, while Chinese casualties have been estimated at 40 killed and several guns destroyed.

== Prelude ==
Starting in July, a number of small UN warships—including the British Royal Navy frigate HMS Cardigan Bay, the South Korean frigate PF62 and the Royal Australian Navy frigate HMAS Murchison—began operating in the Han River, north-west of the South Korean capital, Seoul. The UN warships were able to penetrate 50 kilometres (31 mi) inland from the Yellow Sea to a wide anchorage at the confluence of a number of narrow channels which were still navigable at high tide. From this point many important Chinese targets on the north bank of the Han were engaged with naval gunfire. The frigates had been selected for this task as they combined a shallow draft with adequate firepower and range.

For the first two months Chinese opposition to UN naval operations on the Han was limited to sniping and small arms fire from the riverbank, and occasional fire from 75 mm field-guns which were quickly withdrawn from range. This resistance proved little more than a nuisance to UN operations. Indeed, despite requiring careful navigation, and the constant risk of grounding amidst the numerous sand and mud banks, for a number of weeks the UN ships were able to move along the narrow channels to bombard targets from positions close inshore, enabling them to dominate the Han by both day and night.

== Battle ==
The Chinese soon responded to the challenge and the threat that this posed, however. On the afternoon of 28 September 1951, Murchison—under the command of Lieutenant Commander Allen Nelson Dollard—was ambushed near the mouth of the Yesong River from Chinese positions entrenched and concealed in three nearby villages. The Chinese engaged with 75 mm field-guns, mortars and small arms fire from a range of 2,000 metres (2,200 yd), while Murchison responded with the ships' 4-inch main armament and Bofors. The Australians were struck repeatedly by small arms fire and shrapnel, but achieved direct hits on a 75 mm gun and an enemy trench. No serious damage was sustained, and just one man was wounded. 40 Chinese troops were reported killed in the engagement.

Two days later on 30 September, Murchison was engaged by Chinese fire while transiting the same stretch of river. This time the fire was heavier and more accurate, and the Australian warship was hit several times by 50 mm anti-tank rounds which passed straight through its hull. A 75 mm round also exploded in the engine room, although no significant damage was inflicted. In response Murchison returned a heavy weight of fire and attempted to move westward as the Chinese fire started to slacken. A misty rain squall reduced visibility in the narrow channel, however, forcing Dollard to slow down almost to a halt. As the rain eased the Murchison began to proceed again but was suddenly engaged once more, this time from further to the west by a second group of Chinese weapons from a range of just 600 metres (660 yd). Returning fire vigorously, the Australians destroyed several Chinese positions and subsequently managed to fight their way clear.

== Aftermath ==
The warship suffered seven shell holes as well as extensive, although minor, damage from shrapnel and small arms fire. One of the ship's Bofors guns had also been put out of action. Three more Australians were wounded during this encounter, including one seriously. Despite the incident, UN river patrols continued, although they were significantly restricted due to the increasing threat posed to the ships from Chinese positions along the shore. In November 1951, however, it was decided to cease operations on the Han altogether. A total of 14 UN warships were engaged in these operations over a four-month period; Murchison spent a total of 60 days on the river, 31 days more than any other. Dollard and the Navigation Officer, Lieutenant J. M. Kelly, were awarded the Distinguished Service Cross for the battle.
