= ARC 7 de Agosto (PZE-47) =

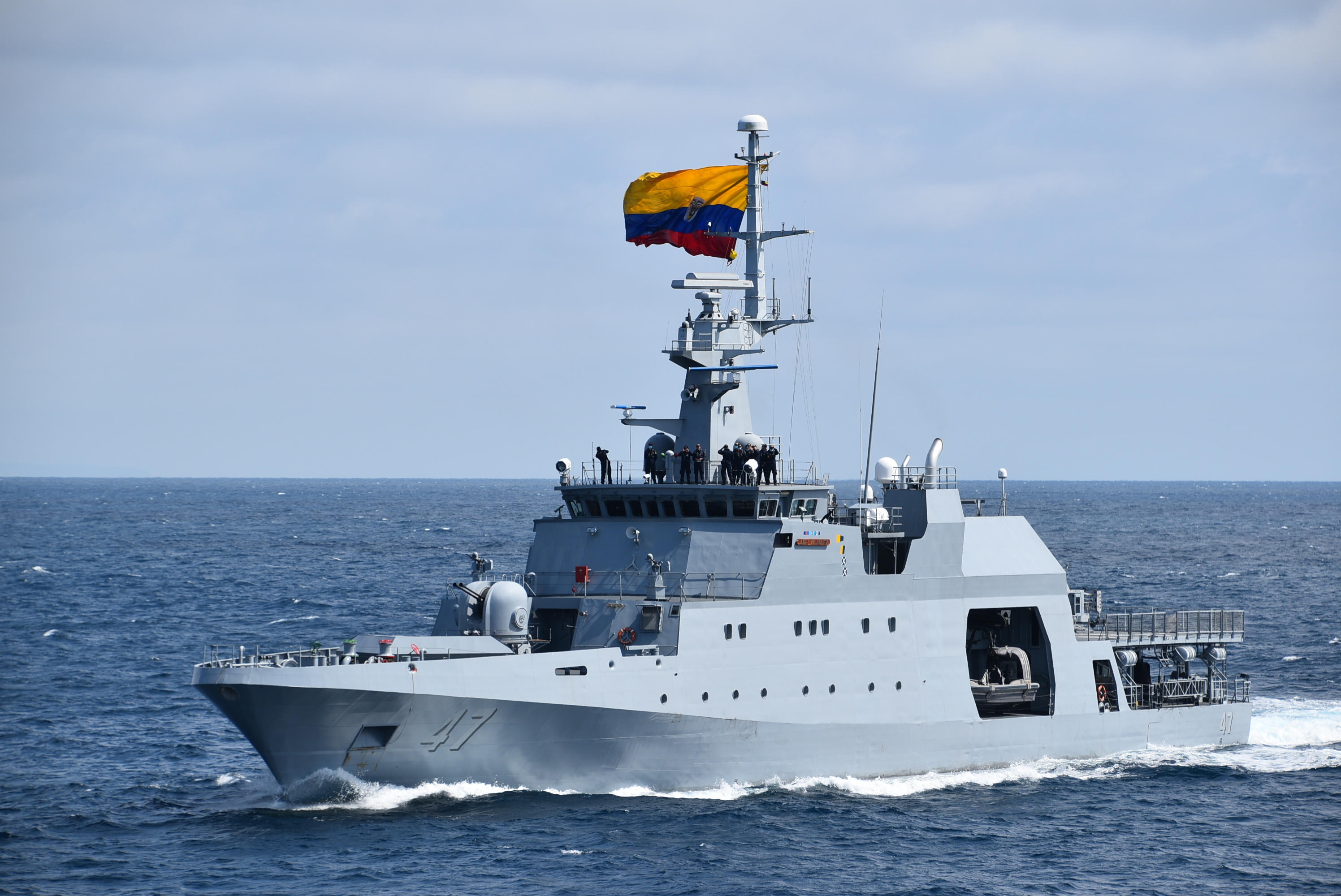
- The second 7 de Agosto

History
- Name: 7 de Agosto
- Owner: Colombian Navy
- Builder: Cotecmar
- Laid down: August 2013
- Identification: MMSI number: 730000047; Callsign: 5KMR

General characteristics
- Class & type: OPV-80-class offshore patrol vessel
- Displacement: 1723 t
- Length: 80.6 m (264.4 ft)
- Beam: 13 m (42.7 ft)
- Draught: 3.77 m (12.4 ft)
- Propulsion: Main engines: 2 × Wärtsilä 12 V 26, 2 × 4,080 kW (5,470 hp) at 1,000 rpm; Propellers: 2 controllable pitch propellers; Bow thruster: 2 × 200 kW (270 hp)
- Speed: 18 knots (33 km/h; 21 mph)
- Range: 12,000 nmi (22,000 km; 14,000 mi) at 12 knots (22 km/h; 14 mph)
- Capacity: 30 passengers
- Complement: 30
- Notes: Anti-rolling tank, Helicopter hangar, deck crane SWl 4 t at 10 m, two service boats (riBs) under single point davits with wave compensation, Water ballast 250 m3, modular platform concept for simple integration of different combat systems, x-shaped hull to reduce radar cross section. Special rescue zone. Launching ramp to accommodate interceptor boat.

ARC 7 de Agosto (PZE-47) is a Colombian-built large offshore patrol vessel of the Colombian Navy. The ship, laid down in August 2013, was built by the firm Cotecmar in Cartagena, Colombia, and used the German design of the Fassmer OPV-80 class, modified to fulfill the requirements of the Colombian Navy. The construction, modified design and engineering was made by Colombians.

== Bibliography ==
- Scheina, Robert L. & Smigielski, Adam (1995). "Columbia". In Chumbley, Stephen (ed.). Conway's All the World's Fighting Ships, 1947–1995 (revised ed.). Naval Institute Press. pp. 68–70. ISBN 1-55750-132-7.
