= ARC Juan Ricardo Oyola Vera =

Riverine patrol and support vessel

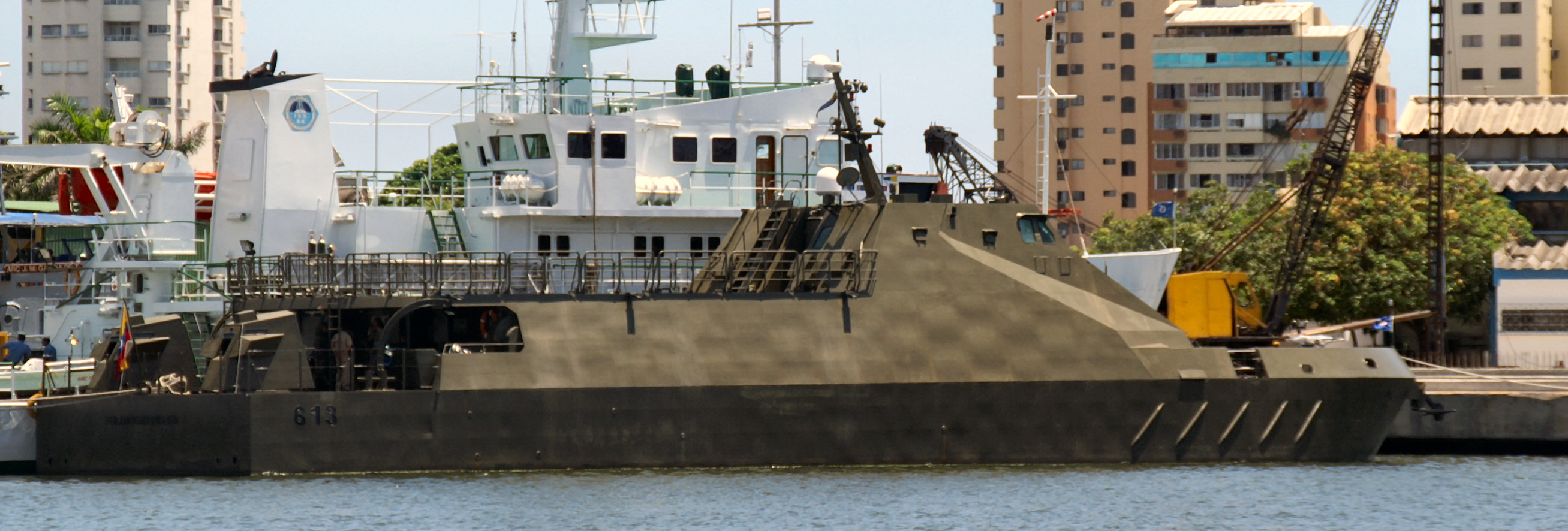
- ARC TEFIM Juan Ricardo Oyola Vera

History

Colombia
- Name: Juan Ricardo Oyola Vera
- Ordered: 2005
- Builder: COTECMAR
- Launched: July 26, 2006
- Status: Active

General characteristics
- Type: Riverine Patrol and Support Vessel (PAF)
- Displacement: 373 tons
- Length: 40.3 m (132 ft 3 in)
- Beam: 9.5 m (31 ft 2 in)
- Draft: 1.26 m (4 ft 2 in)
- Propulsion: Main: 2 × 450 bhp (340 kW) @ 1800 rpm; Pump-jet: 2 × Schottel SPJ82RD
- Speed: 9 knots (17 km/h; 10 mph)
- Range: 2,900 nmi (5,400 km; 3,300 mi)
- Endurance: 20 days
- Complement: 4 officers, 29 crewmen, 39 marines
- Armament: 4 × M60 7.62mm belt fed machine gun; 1 × Santa Bárbara Sistemas LAG 40 40mm belt-fed automatic grenade launcher in a turret
- Armor: NIJ level III
- Aviation facilities: Helipad

ARC Juan Ricardo Oyola Vera is the sixth in a number of progressively improved heavy riverine patrol and support vessels of the Colombian Navy (Armada de la República de Colombia - ARC). Specifically, it is classified as a PAF-IV (Spanish: Patrullera de Apoyo Fluvial - Pesada - 4th generation). The ship is named in honor of the Marine Infantry Frigate Lieutenant Juan Ricardo Oyola Vera, who died in 2004 after wounds sustained in combat against the Revolutionary Armed Forces of Colombia (FARC) during operations in the Colombian eastern plains.

== Background ==
In addition to the more common tasks of a blue-water navy and coast guard, the Colombian Navy (ARC) also has shared responsibility for patrolling the extensive Colombian network of rivers. During the years 2000–2005, the ARC had been slowly but steadily expanding and modernizing its fleet of PAF riverine patrol vessels, and had worked with COTECMAR in the indigenous design and construction of the previous types of PAF vessels (generations I- III). By 2005, the ARC commissioned COTECMAR for a new design that would include and build upon the experiences gathered with the previous generations of vessels. Some of the desired capabilities included extended range/endurance, helipad capability for provisioning and SAR/medevac, newer or upgraded offensive and defensive systems and improved support for embarked Marine Infantry units and smaller dependent patrol boats, such as the 22 ft (6.7 m) 'Piraña' and 'Anguila' boats.

The futuristic look of ARC Juan Ricardo Oyola Vera and its angled surfaces is due to the incorporation of modern design techniques in ballistic protection and marine shipbuilding, and has given rise to the occasional comment about it being a "stealth" vessel. It was designed and built by COTECMAR, a Colombian state-owned shipping design and construction company.

== Service ==
The vessel was launched into service on July 26, 2006. It is deployed to the rivers of the Pacific coast.

== See also ==
- Military Forces of Colombia
- Colombian armed conflict (1964–present)
