= HMAS Murchison =

1944 River-class frigate

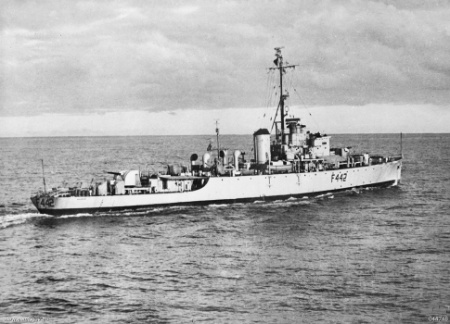
- HMAS Murchison operating off the coast of Korea, circa 1951–52

History

Australia
- Name: Murchison
- Namesake: Murchison River
- Builder: Evans Deakin & Company, Brisbane
- Laid down: 3 June 1943
- Launched: 31 October 1944
- Commissioned: 17 December 1945
- Decommissioned: 15 April 1954
- Motto: "With Undaunted Heart"
- Honours and awards: Battle honours: Korea 1951–52
- Fate: Sold for scrap

General characteristics
- Class & type: Modified River (Bay)-class frigate
- Displacement: 1,537 tons (standard), 2,200 tons (full load)
- Length: 301 ft (92 m)
- Beam: 36 ft (11 m)
- Draught: 12 ft (3.7 m)
- Propulsion: Triple expansion, 2 shafts, 5,500 ihp (4,100 kW)
- Speed: 19.5 knots (36.1 km/h; 22.4 mph)
- Complement: 175
- Armament: 4 × 4-inch guns; 3 × 40 mm Bofors; 4 × 20 mm Oerlikons; 1 × Hedgehog; 4 × Depth Charge Throwers

HMAS Murchison (K442/F442) was a Modified River or Bay-class frigate of the Royal Australian Navy (RAN). The ship was laid down in 1943, but not commissioned until after the end of World War II. Murchison fought in the Korean War, was decommissioned in 1956, and sold for scrap in 1961.

== Construction ==
Murchison was one of four Bay-class frigates constructed in Australia during World War II, being laid down by Evans Deakin & Company, Brisbane on 3 June 1943. She was launched on 31 October 1944, and commissioned on 17 December 1945. She was named for the Murchison River in Western Australia.

== Operational history ==
Completed too late in the war to take part in the fighting, Murchison began her career by visiting Morotai, Ternate, and the Celebes for surveillance duties and War Graves Commission tasks, before sailing to Japan and joining the British Commonwealth Occupation Force. The frigate returned to Australia in May 1946.

Murchison later saw extensive operational service during the Korean War and was involved in the Naval Battle of Han River on 28–30 September 1951, during which she was heavily engaged by Chinese shore installations while conducting riverine operations. Four sailors were wounded in the encounter, while Murchison destroyed a number of Chinese gun positions. The frigate was awarded the battle honour "Korea 1951–52" for her actions during the war.

On 3 October 1952, Murchison was present of the Montebello Islands for the Operation Hurricane nuclear weapons test.

== Fate ==
Murchison paid off on 31 January 1956 and she was sold for scrap on 21 September 1961.
