= Malaga Naval Base, Colombia =

Colombian naval base

Coordinates: 6.6957°N 72.7290°W

Malaga Naval Base is a Naval Base located halfway along the Pacific Coastline of Colombia, strategically located to combat drug trafficking. It is used by both Colombian Naval Infantry and the United States Marine Corps under a defence agreement. While not technically incorrect, this brief description is misleading in the sense that fails to make clear that it is a Colombian naval base used for joint exercises between Peru, Ecuador, Panama and Colombia which also include the participation of the United States.
