= Colombian Navy =

Maritime branch of Colombia's military

Colombian National Navy
- Armada Nacional de la República de Colombia
- Coat of arms of the Colombian Navy
- Founded: July 24, 1823
- Country: Colombia
- Type: Navy
- Role: Naval warfare Protection of the seas and rivers of Colombia
- Size: 35,086 As of September 2013; ~13,000 Officers & sailors ~22,000 Marine Infantry
- Part of: Military Forces of Colombia
- Motto: Plus Ultra (Latin: further beyond)
- March: "Viva Colombia, soy marinero"
- Anniversaries: July 24
- Engagements: Battle of Lake Maracaibo; Thousand Days War (Civil war); Colombia-Peru War; World War II; Korean War; Colombian Armed Conflict; Operation Atalanta

Commanders
- Notable commanders: José Prudencio Padilla

Insignia
- Naval ensign

- Naval jack

- Flag

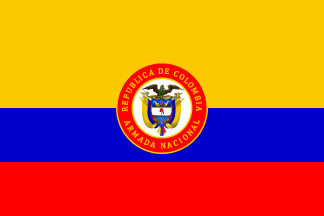
- Standard

The Colombian Navy, officially the Colombian National Navy (Spanish: Armada Nacional de la República de Colombia), also known as the "Armada Nacional" or just the "Armada" in Spanish, is the naval branch of the Military Forces of Colombia. The Navy is responsible for security and defence in the Colombian zones of both the Atlantic (Caribbean) and Pacific oceans, the extensive network of rivers inside the country, and a few small land areas under its direct jurisdiction.

The Colombian Navy has a strength of 35,086 personnel as of September 2013 including approximately 22,000 in the Marine Infantry corps.

The acronym "ARC", (Spanish: Armada de la República de Colombia) is used both as the official ship prefix for all the Colombian Navy ships, as well as a common short name for the Navy itself.

== Mission ==
"Protecting the blue of our flag"

As stated in its institutional site, the mission of the Colombian Navy is:

“Contribute with the defense of the Nation through the effective use of flexible naval power in the maritime, river and land spaces under its responsibility, in order to fulfill the constitutional role and participate in the development of sea power and the protection of the interests of Colombians".

In order to accomplish its mission, the Colombian navy establishes four strategic objectives:

1. Protection of the population and resources and consolidation of territorial control.
2. Neutralization of illegal drug trafficking.
3. Strategic deterrence.
4. Maritime and riverine safety.

In addition to functions of security and defense the Navy is called to participate in missions aimed to ensure the integral use of the sea by the Nation. For this purpose it must fulfill both military and diplomatic activities along with implementation and enforcement of law and order.

Its formal motto has been historically, "Plus Ultra" (Latin: further beyond); but more recently, and as part of a public media campaign in the 2000s, the additional slogan "Protecting the blue of our flag" (Spanish: Protegemos el azul de la bandera) became known and has been adopted institutionally as well, perhaps as a result of being a more relatable catchphrase to the public than the formal Latin motto.

Its former slogan was "Sailing our pride" (Spanish: Navega nuestro orgullo).

== History ==
The history of the Colombian Navy is interesting.

=== 19th century and origins ===
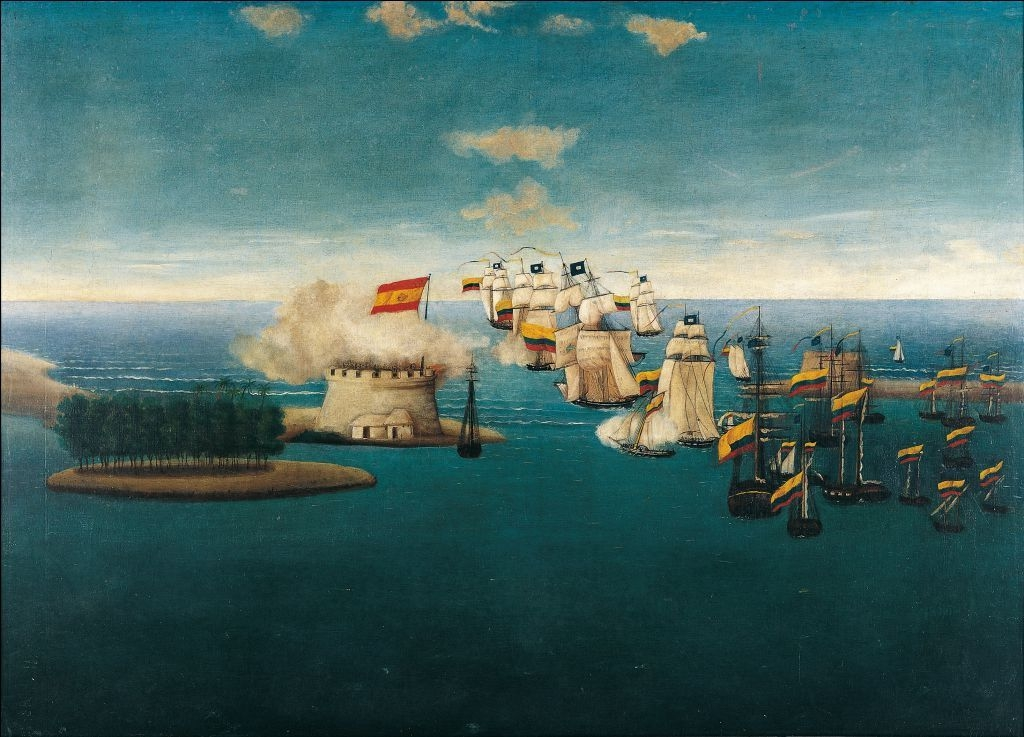
"Acción del Castillo de Maracaibo " Painting by José María Espinosa Prieto (1796–1883)

The Colombian Navy celebrates its birthday on July 24, the anniversary of the Battle of Lake Maracaibo fought on July 24, 1823, which was the last large naval battle of the Spanish American wars of independence.

During 1815, a Spanish army headed by Pablo Morillo besieged Cartagena, as the first step of its "Pacifying Expedition" (Spanish: Expedición Pacificadora). The five-month siege was so harsh that earned the city its title of "Heroic" (Spanish: La Heróica). The small independent navy was impotent against the large fleet commanded by Morillo, but nevertheless managed some daring actions, in particular that of Luis Brión, who attempted to run the blockade with his corvette Dard with a load of guns and powder to the city before fleeing again to Haiti. In 1816, Simón Bolívar attempted his first campaign, the Cayos expedition, sailing from Haiti with seven schooners and corvettes: Bolivar, Mariño, Piar, Constitución, Brión, Fénix, and Conejo. But this expedition fizzled out due to infighting amongst its generals shortly after the liberation of Margarita Island.

General Francisco de Paula Santander created the Naval School on June 28, 1822.

In 1824 the first – and only – eight cadet officers graduated from naval school. On March 3, 1826, the Ministry of the Navy was created, with Lino de Clemente as minister. By 1826, both from bought and captured vessels, the Colombian Navy had become a respectable force, commanding a relatively large number of ships, including a ship of the line, a frigate, six corvettes, five brigantines, 10 schooners, 13 gunboats, and many minor vessels.

But the fledgling government was strapped financially, and in a decree of December 7, 1826, Bolívar decommissioned the Naval school, abolished the Ministry of the Navy, and slashed the budget for all navy and marine affairs by more than half. (Note: The marine budget of 1826 was $4,809,077 pesos. The budget for 1827 was $2.026.422, apx. 42%) The Navy would not recover from this blow for almost a hundred years. The incipient navy of 1825 saw its ships slowly sold, scrapped, or abandoned, and by the late 1830s there were no more than a handful of serviceable ships, mostly assigned to the Army.

Under President Tomás Cipriano de Mosquera, a sizeable naval force was acquired during 1866, with the steamers of war Colombia, Cuaspud and Bolívar being purchased in England, and the Rayo acquired from America. Rayo was the largest, carrying four 9 inch guns, two smaller 30-pounders, and six torpedo launches, and was incorporated into the Colombian fleet after accusations she was due to be delivered to Chile or Peru for the war against Spain. It was not to last, congress decreed the ships of the navy should be sold on June 6, 1867. The Rayo was subsequently blown onto a reef September 12, 1867 and Cuaspud was wrecked on her delivery voyage just eleven days later. The Colombia was sold in 1868, and the Bolívar, last of Mosquera's men-of-war, sold in 1872.

During the rest of the 19th century, there was no formal navy to speak of. Some vessels and naval units were assigned to the Army, and throughout the civil wars of the 1880s, some transport vessels were hurriedly bought, and similarly disposed of, but no formal navy appeared.

On January 11, 1895, an important step was made in re-establishing the formal Colombian Navy when the three gunboats of the coastguard and the Magdalena were transferred from the Ministry of the Treasury to the Ministry of War.

=== Early 20th century ===
By 1907, when President Rafael Reyes Prieto created the Naval Academy, through decree 783 of July 6, 1907, only to be closed off yet again by his successor, Ramón González Valencia on December 28, 1909.

The conflict with Peru in 1932 made the Colombian Navy reappear, this time to stay. New ships were acquired and the "Escuela de Grumetes" (Navy Sailors School) was founded in 1934 and the "Escuela de Cadetes" (Navy Officers School) was founded in 1935. Nowadays both schools continue their work of instructing the Colombian men and women of the sea.

==== World War II ====
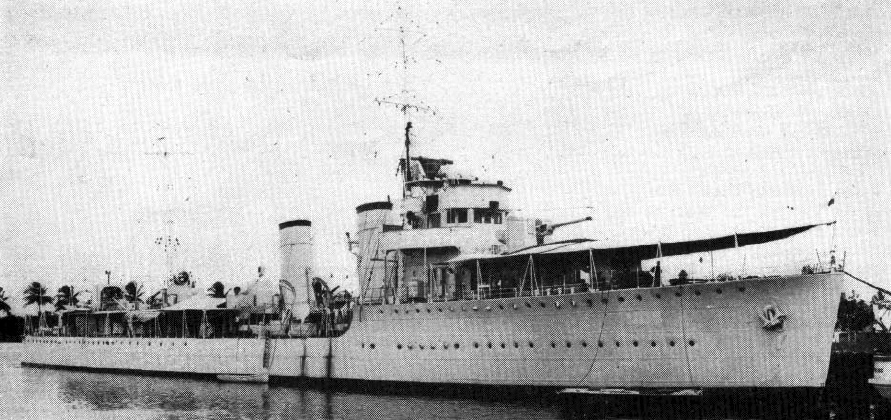
Colombian destroyer Caldas in the 1940s

During World War II, Colombia initially declared its neutrality, but nevertheless leaned towards the Allied cause; between 1939 and 1941 nothing much changed either in political relations nor in the sea, as the war was seen as a mostly European issue. The Japanese attack on Pearl Harbor in December 1941 changed things somewhat and prompted Colombia to break diplomatic relations with the Axis countries, but not to formally declare war. By 1942 the Colombian Navy found itself performing regular patrols in the Caribbean Sea-something that was only occasionally done in the years previous to the war-due to German U-boats marauding the Panama Canal access routes, mostly hunting for American and British vessels entering or leaving the canal.
These German hunting runs, despite the Colombian Navy patrols, eventually resulted in the sinking of three Colombian ships during 1942–43, under circumstances that were never fully cleared up. The three vessels were: Resolute, a 52-tonne (Note: German sources rate it at 35-tonne, but Colombian archives of the time, including the diplomatic note of protest sent on June 26, 1942, via the Switzerland delegation, rate it at 52-tonne) schooner sunk on June 23, 1942, by U-172; Roamar (originally registered as Urious), a 110-tonne schooner sunk on July 27, 1942, by U-505 and finally, Rubby, a 39-tonne schooner sunk on November 1, 1943, by the German submarine U-516. Rubby's sinking led to Colombia formally declaring a 'belligerent status' against Germany and the other Axis powers on November 23, 1943 and as a result the Colombian Navy significantly stepped up its presence in the Caribbean after this date and throughout the rest of the war.

On March 29, 1944, as the tanker MC Cabimas was en route from Cartagena to Panama City escorted by the destroyer ARC Caldas, the latter under the command of Captain Federico Diago Díaz. Around 8:00 pm, Caldas detected the periscope of a U-boat and proceeded to engage it with cannon fire and depth charges. Later accounts identified this U-boat as U-154. While badly shaken and perhaps damaged, U-154 managed to escape, and was sunk four months later in another engagement with USS Frost and USS Inch. For his quick reaction in defence of the national seas, Captain Diago Díaz was later decorated by the Colombian government.

==== Korean War ====
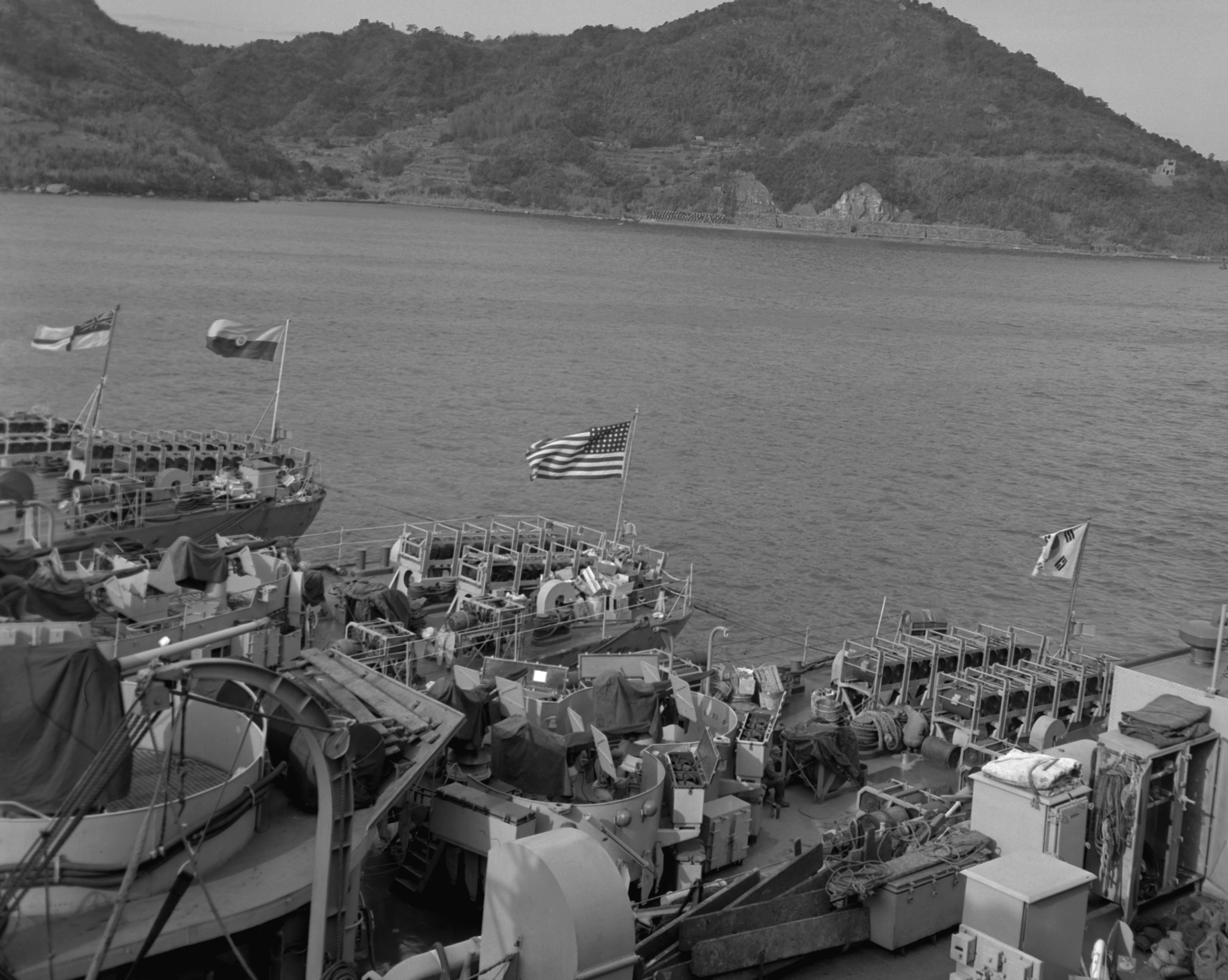
Ships of four nations alongside the US Navy repair ship Jason at the Han Estuary, South Korea, 16 January 1952. The ships (L-R) are: HMAS Murchison, ARC Almirante Padilla, USS Gloucester and ROKS Taedong.

Colombia was signatory to the Declaration by United Nations in 1943, and one of the original 51 signatory countries to the creation of the United Nations (UN) at the San Francisco Conference. As such, when the Korean War erupted, and the UN Security Council issued S/RES/83 : Complaint of aggression upon the Republic of Korea and decided the formation and dispatch of the UN Forces in Korea, Colombia was the only sovereign country (Note: Puerto Rico is also occasionally noted as another Latin American country to support the effort, but in reality, it is an unincorporated territory of the United States) in Latin America that offered support, by sending a frigate (afterwards, Colombia also provided an infantry battalion). This act, and the subsequent effort and sacrifice of the Colombian troops and sailors on the defense of South Korea have made the relationship between South Korea and Colombia much closer ever since. The Colombian forces deployed in Korea became known as the Colombian Battalion.

Perhaps not surprisingly, there were multiple opinions in the US about accepting this help: On the one side, the State Department wanted to make sure the UN-sponsored operation had indeed the collaboration of multiple countries, the Treasury viewed it with disbelief and worried about the underlying extra cost that such 'help' would likely represent and might need to be paid by the US in the end, and the Defense Department wanted as much external help as possible, while also losing sleep about the logistics nightmare of integrating foreign units with little knowledge of its standards and even the language. Finally, the Colombian offer was accepted, and with Government Decree 3230 of October 23, 1950, Colombia's participation becomes formal and the Navy Ops Chief would receive orders to incorporate the Colombian frigate to the Order of Battle, under the 7th Fleet's Task Force 95. Eventually, Colombia provided three frigates that would rotate their service throughout 1951–1955.

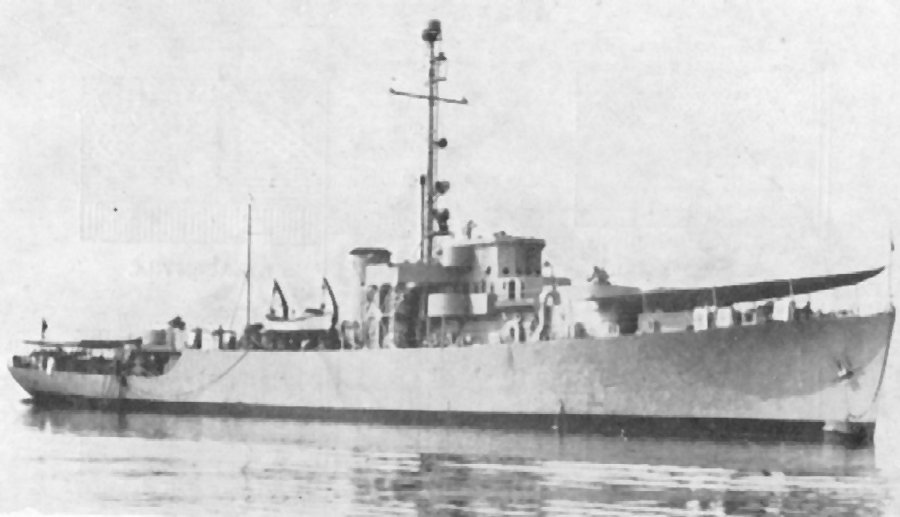
ARC Almirante Padilla (CM 51) circa 1948.

The frigate ARC Almirante Padilla (Note: ARC Almirante Padilla was the former USS Groton) took to sea on November 1, 1950 under command of CC Julio Cesar Reyes Canal, stopping at San Diego, California, for fitting and then at Hawaii for operations training with the US Navy, finally reaching its destination at the Korean coast on May 14, 1951. Almirante Padilla performed operations with the escort groups GT95.5 and Blockade GT95.2, participated in the coastal bombardment at Wonsan and patrol runs at Wonsan, Seongjin and the islands of Cho-Do and Seok-Do; it finished its first tour on January 19, 1952.

The frigate ARC Capitán Tono, (Note: ARC Capitán Tono was the former USS Bisbee) under command of CC Hernando Berón Victoria replaced Almirante Padilla in January, and performed patrol and coast operations also around Wonsan and Seongjin, and submarine patrol around the Sasebo naval base; it received the Republic of Korea Merit medal for its support to the naval operations in the area; it finished its first tour on November 12, 1952.

The frigate ARC Almirante Brión, (Note: ARC Almirante Brión was the former USS Burlington) under command of CC Carlos Prieto Silva formally relieved Capitán Tono in November 1952. However, it only arrived in the area by June 1953, as it had to be refitted in Japan due to some damages during its previous tour as USS Burlington. It performed patrols at the same areas as its sister ships and would finish its first tour on May 17, 1954.

All three frigates continued their service tours, until October 1955, and distinguished themselves in their duty along with other units from United States, Australia, New Zealand, the Republic of Korea and Thailand, amongst others.

=== 21st century ===
==== Anti-piracy operations in the Horn of Africa ====
On 27 July 2015, the Colombian offshore patrol vessel ARC 7 de Agosto set sail from the port city of Cartagena de Indias to take part in both Operation Atalanta and Operation Ocean Shield. During the operations, the Colombian Navy monitored over 400 watercraft near the coast of Somalia. The operations also saw an opportunity for the Colombian Navy patrol vessel to perform naval exercises with other navies taking part in the surveillance efforts; amongst them where Hyanë and Erfurt of the German Navy, Galicia, Victoria, and Meteoro of the Spanish Navy, the destroyer JS Akizuki of the Japan Maritime Self-Defense Force, and HDMS Absalon of the Royal Danish Navy. While stationed on Victoria, Seychelles, the crew aboard ARC 7 de Agosto also instructed and shared information, with members of the Seychelles Coast Guard and Maritime Police, on structural and naval operations.

=== Engagements and Conflicts ===
- Battle of Lake Maracaibo
- Thousand Days War (Civil war)
- Colombia-Peru War
- World War II
- Korean War
- Colombian Armed Conflict
- Operation Atalanta
- Operation Enduring Freedom – Horn of Africa
  - Operation Ocean Shield

== Organization ==
The Navy is part of the executive branch of the Colombian Government, the President of Colombia being the commander-in-chief of all military forces, via the civilian Minister of Defense, and the General Commander of Military Forces (Spanish: Comandante General Fuerzas Militares), who is a senior officer appointed by the president from any of the 3 services (Army, Aerospace Force or Navy). The most senior officer organic to the Navy is the Commander of the Navy (Spanish: Comandante de la Armada Nacional).

=== Forces and Commands ===
The Colombian Navy operates with 8 specialized forces or commands across the territory:

- Marine Infantry Command: Land, amphibious and riverine operations across all territory.
- Naval Force of the Pacific: Surface and submarine defense and patrol of the Colombian Pacific sea.
- Naval Force of the Caribbean: Surface and submarine defense and patrol of the Colombian Caribbean sea.
- Naval Force of the South: Riverine operations across the Southern and Southeastern areas of the country.
- Naval Force of the East
- Comando de Guardacostas: Maritime security, control, monitoring and interdiction in both Caribbean and Pacific seas.
- Navy Aviation Command: Naval air support, surveillance, transport and logistics and Search and Rescue.
- Specific Command of San Andres y Providencia: Surface and submarine defense and patrol of the Colombian Caribbean sea around the San Andres Archipelago.

=== Naval educational institutions ===
Along with the 7 operational commands above, the Colombian Navy maintains 3 major training schools for its personnel:

- Naval Academy: Escuela Naval de Cadetes "Almirante Padilla"
- Navy NCO School: Escuela Naval de Suboficiales ARC Barranquilla
- Marine Infantry Basic School: Escuela de Formación Infantería de Marina

The Navy also has 12 other post graduate schools aimed at sharpening and intensifying the needed capacities and personnel of the various naval services and the Marine Corps.

=== Operating Bases ===
Major naval bases of the Colombian Navy Exclusive Economic Zone Navy: Naval, Riverine and Primary Operating bases Marine Infantry: Primary base and training school

The ARC maintains a number of major bases in both Caribbean and Pacific littorals, as well as multiple operational riverine bases scattered over the territory.
The principal naval bases are:

- Naval Base ARC Bolívar (BN-1), near Cartagena, 10°24′42.91″N 75°32′55.62″W
- Naval Base ARC Bahía Málaga (BN-2), near Buenaventura, 3°58′8.64″N 77°19′1.09″W
- Naval Base ARC Leguízamo (BN-3), near Puerto Leguízamo, 0°12′10.92″S 74°46′37.29″W
- Naval Base ARC San Andrés (BN-4), at San Andrés, 12°31′31.16″N 81°43′48.61″W
- Naval Base ARC Puerto Carreño (BN-5), near Puerto Carreño, 6°10′43.63″N 67°28′54.49″W

some of the more important operational bases are:

- Riverine and Coast Guard Post, near Tumaco, 1°48′43.56″N 78°45′59.33″W
- Riverine and Marine Infantry Post, near Leticia, 4°12′48.25″S 69°56′46.23″W
- Riverine and Marine Infantry Post, near Puerto Berrío 6°29′27.32″N 74°23′44.91″W
- Riverine and Marine Infantry Post, near Puerto Carreño 6°10′43.63″N 67°28′54.49″W
- Riverine and Marine Infantry Post, near Puerto Inírida 3°52′7.35″N 67°55′43.41″W

The Colombian Navy also plans to establish a naval base in Antarctica, to be called the "Almirante Padilla Summer Scientific Station".

== Personnel ==
In 2013, the Colombian Navy had approximately 35,000 personnel, including roughly 22,000 Marine Infantry, 8,000 sailors and NCOs, 2,500 officers, 1,300 personnel in training and some 2,000 civilians (these usually deployed to specialty technical or medical posts).

=== Ranks & Insignias ===
The tables below display the rank structures and rank insignias for the Colombian Navy personnel. (Note: Colombia is not a member of NATO, so there is not an official equivalence between the Colombian military ranks and those defined by NATO. The displayed parallel is approximate and for illustration purposes only.)

=== Officers ===
Rank group	General/flag officers					Senior officers			Junior officers
Colombian National Navy
Colombian National Navy		Almirante		Vicealmirante	Contralmirante	Capitán de navío	Capitán de fragata	Capitán de corbeta	Teniente de navío	Teniente de fragata	Teniente de corbeta
Abbr.	-	ALM	-	VALM	CALM	CN	CF	CC	TN	TF	TK	-

=== Enlisted ===
Rank group	Senior NCOs						Junior NCOs		Enlisted
Colombian National Navy
Colombian National Navy	Suboficial jefe técnico de comando conjunto	Suboficial jefe técnico de comando	Suboficial jefe técnico	Suboficial jefe	Suboficial primero	Suboficial segundo	Suboficial tercero	Marinero primero	Marinero segundo
Abbr.	SJTCC	SJTC	SJT	SJ	S1	S2	S3	MA1	MA2	-

== Equipment ==
=== Ships ===
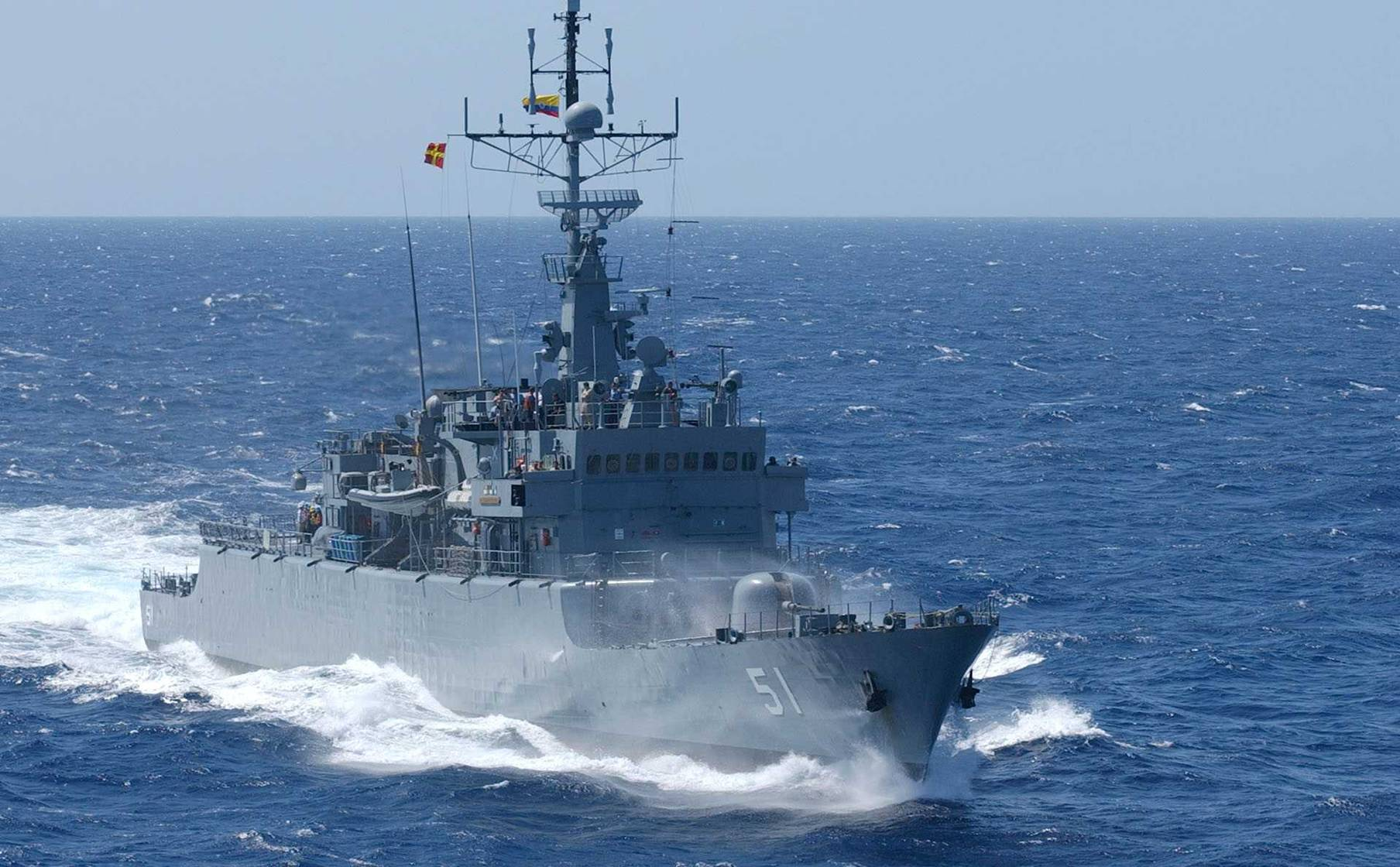
ARC Almirante Padilla (FM-51)

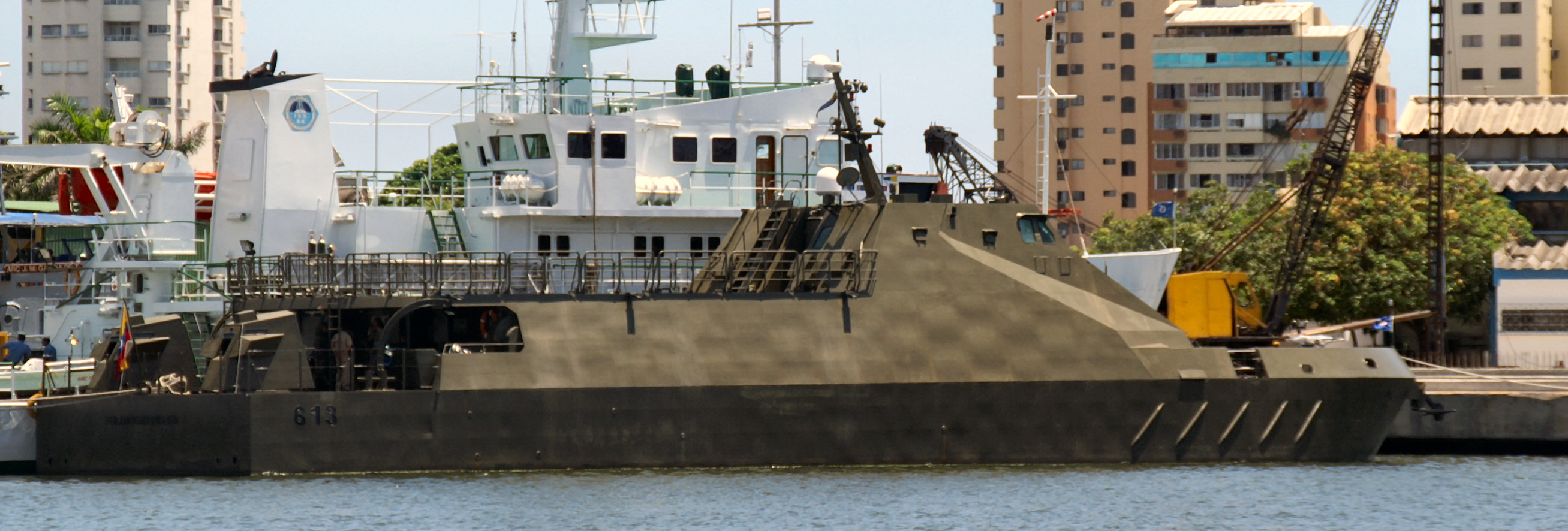
ARC Juan Ricardo Oyola Vera (NF-613) in Cartagena

In keeping with its three major operational scenarios: blue-water operations, littoral/riverine operations and coast guard, the ARC maintains a mix of ships suited to each of those profiles. The scope of its operation has been historically oriented towards lightly armed coastal patrol, and as such, the majority of its vessels had been usually mid-size cutters. Traditionally, the ARC has had strong ties to the American and German navies and shipbuilders and much of its equipment traces its roots to them.
Similar to other navies in the Latin-American region, the Colombian Navy acquired many vessels in the postwar years of the 1950s and 1960s, usually as war surplus from the US Navy, and then went through a somewhat dormant period during the 1960s to 1980s, during which few major acquisitions were performed.

In more recent years, the Colombian Navy has seen two major periods of upgrading and modernization of its equipment:
The first period, as a result of the rise of the drug trade in the late 1970s and 1980s as well as, at the time, increased political tensions in the Caribbean due to territorial disputes with some of its neighbors -with Nicaragua over the San Andres archipelago and with Venezuela over the Los Monjes Archipelago- saw the need for a stronger Caribbean patrol force, and resulted in the acquisition of its biggest vessels to date, four missile corvettes (later upgraded to light frigates) in 1983 as well as some additional patrol craft.

The second period, as a consequence of the deepening in the internal Colombian conflict, started in the late 1990s and extended over to 2005–2006, provided strengthening of its riverine and littoral capabilities, involving research and development for new indigenous designs in collaboration with the state-owned Cotecmar shipyards that resulted in new types of vessels such as the state-of-the-art Riverine Support Patrol Boats (Spanish: Patrullera de Apoyo Fluvial, "PAF"), also called "riverine mothership" (Spanish: Nodriza Fluvial) like ARC Juan Ricardo Oyola Vera (NF-613) which have drawn the eye of other navies with similar requirements.

Currently, the ARC is working on additional medium and long-term programs, including the development and acquisition of a number of coastal patrol vessels (Fassmer CPV-40) (Note: Some sources have cited the acquisition of up to 4 CPV-40 vessels, however, as of April 2011, only one has been confirmed launched, and budgetary constraints may change this number in the future.) in 2011–2012, two oceanic patrol vessels (Fassmer OPV-80) (2011–2013), and the research and development of an indigenous corvette or frigate-class vessel ("Plataforma Estratégica de Superficie"), planned towards 2018–2020.

On 7 October 2011, South Korea announced they would donate a recently retired Pohang-class corvette to Colombia as part of a drive to boost arms exports to the South American region. An-Yang (PCC-755) was decommissioned by the Republic of Korea Navy (RoKN) on 29 September, having been active for some 28 years since entering service in 1983.

In September 2022, the Colombian Navy signed a contract for the design and construction of 5 new frigates as part of the PES programma with Cotecmar shipyard and Damen Shipyards based on the SIGMA10514 design for delivery from 2026 onwards

On January 31, 2026, the ARC 24 de Julio, an offshore patrol vessel (OPV) built by the Science and Technology Corporation for Naval, Maritime and Fluvial Industry Development (Cotecmar), was officially delivered to the Colombian Navy at the ARC "Bolívar" Naval Base, becoming the largest vessel designed and constructed in Colombia to date. Resulting from a ten-year joint conceptualization and development effort between the Navy and Cotecmar and a two-and-a-half-year construction phase, the ship represents a milestone in national maritime sovereignty and technological independence, utilizing over 1,070 metric tons of steel, 11 metric tons of aluminum, and nearly 90 kilometers of cabling, while generating 1,114 direct and 2,228 indirect/induced jobs and involving 343 national and international supplier companies.

=== Aircraft ===
Colombian Naval Aviation roundel.

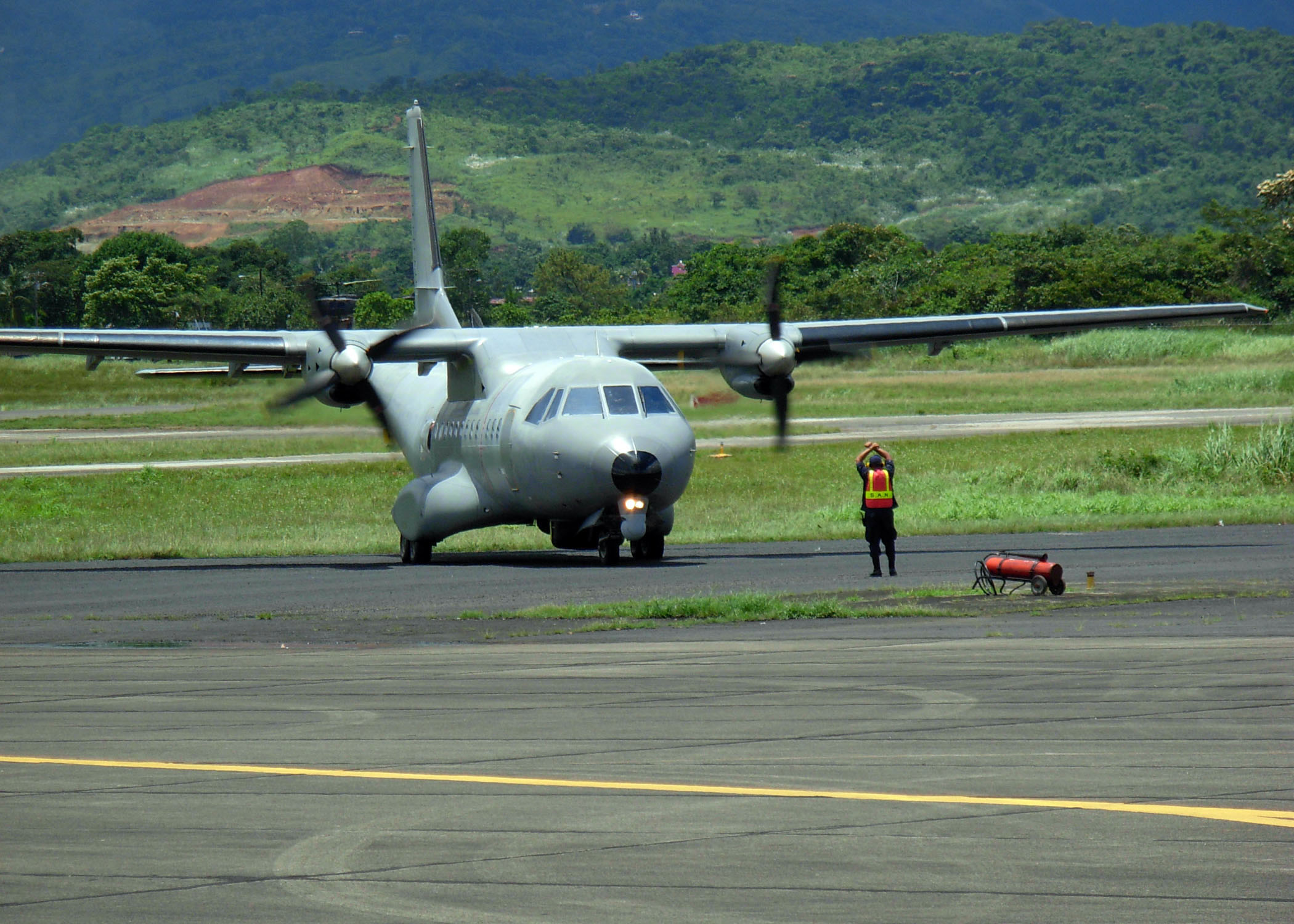
Colombian CN-235 aircraft at Panama Tocumen International Airport during PANAMAX 2007

The Navy Aviation Command operates approximately 17 fixed and rotary wing aircraft for naval surveillance and patrol, Search and Rescue (SAR), and logistical support of naval facilities and operations.

Colombian Navy – Aircraft
Aircraft	Origin	Type	Versions	In service	Notes
Fixed Wing
CASA C-212 Aviocar	Spain / Indonesia	Transport	C-212-100	1	
CASA CN-235	Spain / Indonesia	Maritime patrol		3	
Cessna 208	United States	utility		2	
Beechcraft Super King Air	United States	Transport	King Air 350	1	
Rotary Wing
Bell UH-1N Twin Huey	United States	Transport helicopter		5	
Bell 412HP	United States	Utility helicopter		Unknown	One lost on 6 January 2013.
MBB/Kawasaki BK 117	Germany / Japan	Transport helicopter		1	
MBB Bo 105	Germany	ASW/utility Helicopter	Bo 105CB	2	
Eurocopter AS 555 Fennec	France	Utility helicopter	AS 555	2	

== See also ==
- Colombian Naval Infantry
- Military Forces of Colombia
- Military ranks of the Colombian Armed Forces
