= COTECMAR =

Colombian state-owned defense, shipbuilder, and engineering company

Corporación de Ciencia y Tecnología para el Desarrollo de la Industria Naval Marítima y Fluvial
- Native name: Spanish: Corporación de Ciencia y Tecnología para el Desarrollo de la Industria Naval Marítima y Fluvial
- Type: State owned enterprise
- Industry: Shipbuilding, Defence
- Founded: July 21, 2000; 26 years ago
- Headquarters: Bogotá & Cartagena, Colombia
- Area served: International, mainly Americas
- Key people: VALM. Luis Fernando Marquez (President)
- Products: Warships, Research vessels, Merchant vessels, Tugboats, Floating Drydocks
- Owner: Ministry of National Defense of Colombia
- Website: www.cotecmar.com

COTECMAR (Corporación de Ciencia y Tecnología para el Desarrollo de la Industria Naval Marítima y Fluvial; English: Science and Technology Corporation for the Development of the Naval, Maritime and River Industry) is a Colombian state-owned defense, shipbuilder, and engineering company that provides services to the Ministry of National Defense of Colombia and other domestic and international customers. It is the largest and most important shipbuilding and repair company in Colombia, with facilities in Mamonal and Bocagrande in Cartagena de Indias.

== History ==
Initially established in 1969 as CONASTIL, the organization served as a cornerstone of Colombia's naval industry until its liquidation in 1994. Recognizing the crucial need to revive the nation's industrial and maritime capabilities, the Colombian Navy embarked on a mission from 1998 to 2000 to restore this vital sector. These dedicated efforts culminated on July 21, 2000, with the founding of COTECMAR—a new entity symbolizing a renewed commitment to advancing Colombia's naval, maritime, and fluvial industries.

In September 2022, COTECTMAR and the Damen Group signed an agreement to co-develop and produce five new frigates for the Colombian Navy based on the Sigma-class design.

== Products ==
=== Warships ===
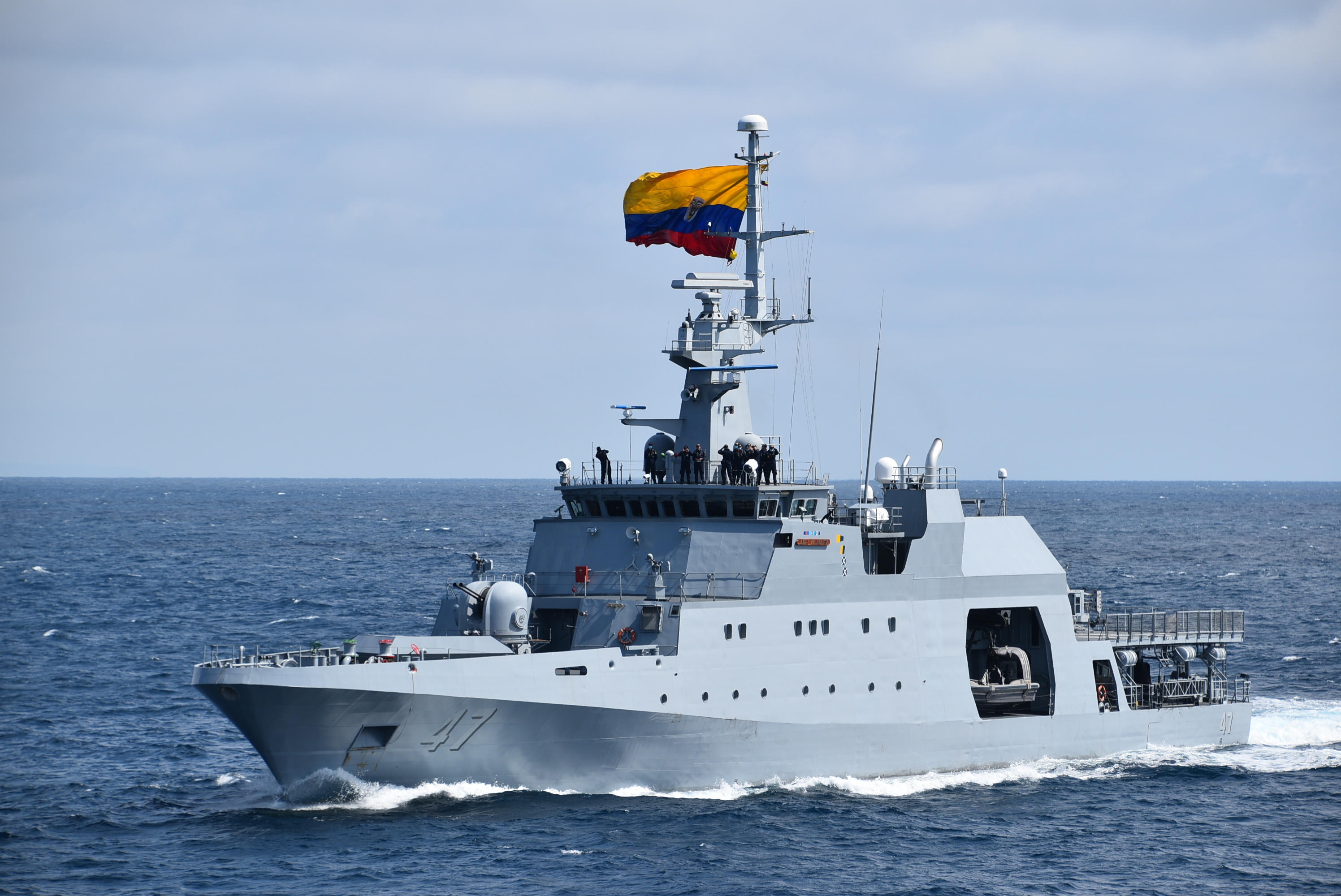
OPV-80 built by COTECMAR for the Colombian Navy

- Frigates (Sigma-class design)
- Patrol boats (OPV-93, LPR-40)
- Landing Craft Utility (Golfo de Tribuga-class landing craft)

== Notable clients ==
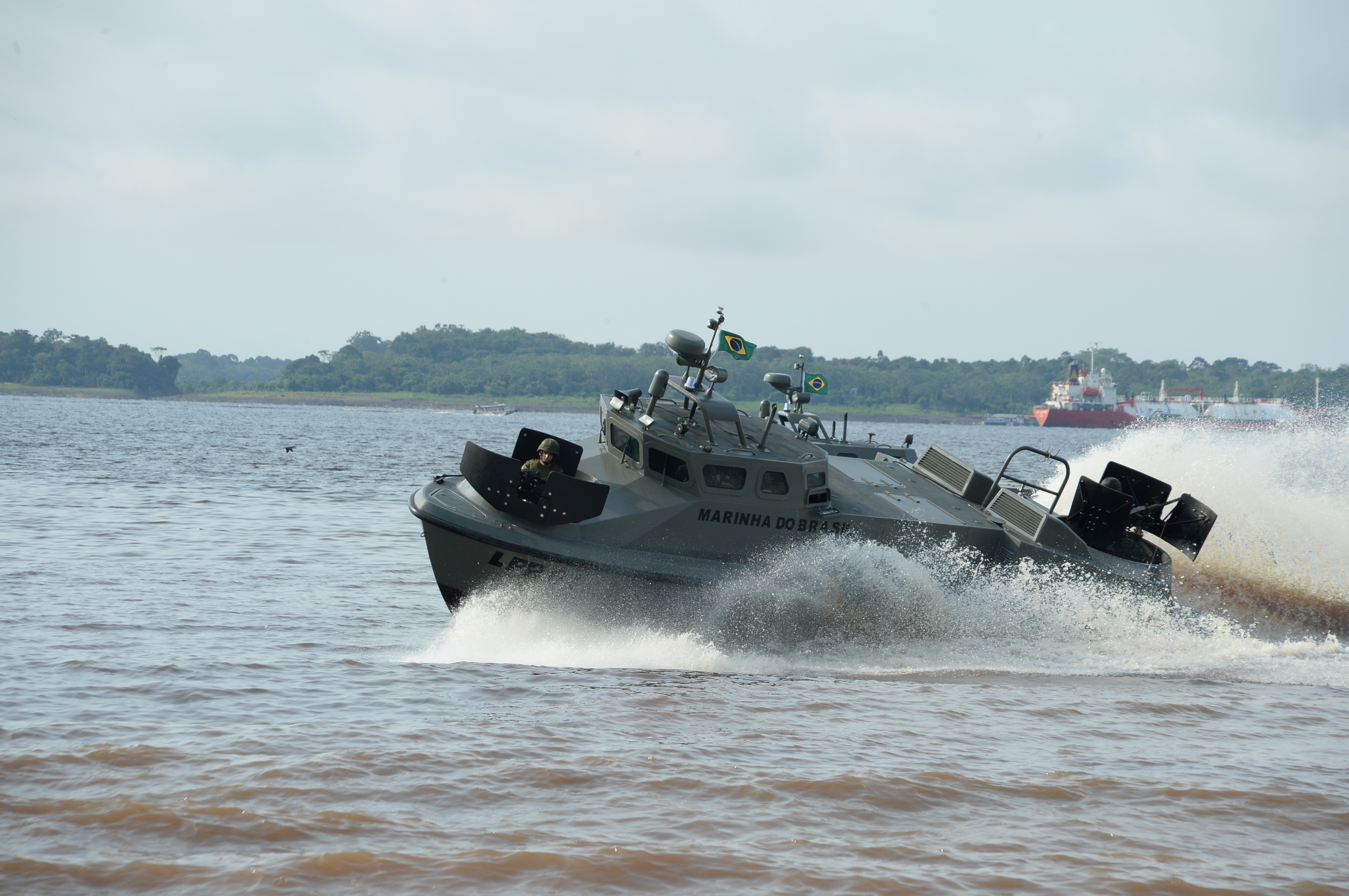
LPR-40 riverine patrol boat of the Brazilian Navy

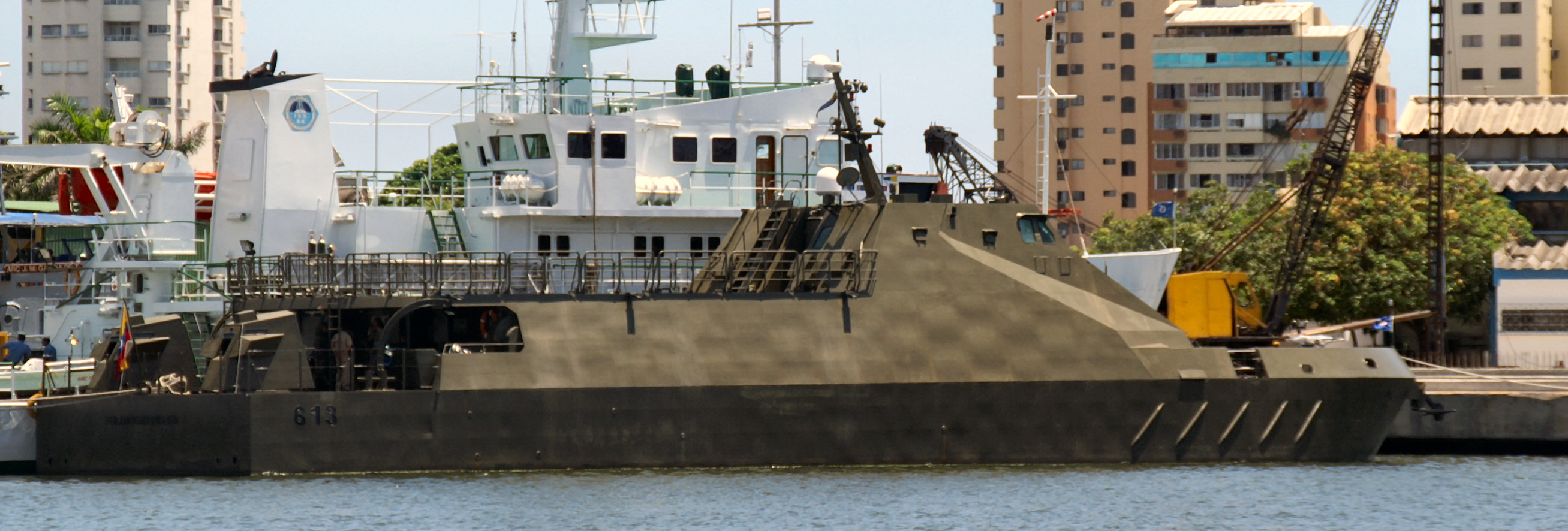
PAF-IV of the Colombian Navy

- Brazil
  - Brazilian Army, Brazilian Navy
    - LPR-40 riverine patrol boats
- Colombia
  - Colombian National Navy
    - OPV-80-class offshore patrol vessel
  - Colombian Naval Infantry
- Costa Rican Coast Guard
  - Maintenance work for Libertador Juan Rafael Mora Porras
- Guatemalan Navy
  - Golfo de Tribuga-class landing craft
  - Botes de Operación Fluvial de Bajo Calado - BOFBC
- Guyana
  - Botes de Operación Fluvial de Bajo Calado - BOFBC
- Honduran Navy
  - Golfo de Tribuga-class landing craft
  - SAFE BOATS 35MMI Multi Misión Interceptor
- Jamaica
- Netherlands
  - Royal Netherlands Navy
    - Maintenance work for HNLMS Pelikaan (A804)

== See also ==
- Indumil
