= Elsy =

Elsy is a name. Notable people with this name include:

== Given name ==
- Elsy Steinberg, birth name of Elaine Stewart (1930–2011), American actress and model
- Elsy Borders (1905–1971), English activist
- Elsy Jacobs (1933–1998), Luxembourgish road bicycle racer
- Elsy Rivas (born 1949), Colombian sprinter
- Elsy del Pilar Cuello (born 1959), Colombian judge

== Surname ==
- Hannah Elsy (born 1986), British rower
