= Counternarcotics and Transnational Threats Command (Colombia) =

- Comando Contra el Narcotráfico y las Amenazas Transnacionales
- Active: 26 February 2021 - Present
- Country: Colombia
- Branch: Army
- Type: Command
- Role: Air assault Airlift; Anti-tank warfare Artillery observer Bomb disposal Clandestine operation Close-quarters battle Counterinsurgency; Counternarcotics; Counter transnational threats Counter-sniper tactics Covert operation Force protection HUMINT; Intelligence assessment Jungle warfare Maneuver warfare Military communications Military engineering Military intelligence Mountain warfare Raiding; Reconnaissance; Screening; SIGINT; Special operations Special reconnaissance Support urban counterterrorism Tracking; Urban warfare
- Size: 7,000 troops
- Part of: Air Assault Division
- Garrison/HQ: Tolemaida Air Base

Commanders
- Current commander: Brigadier general Juan Carlos Correa Consuegra

The Counternarcotics and Transnational Threats Command (Spanish: Comando Contra el Narcotráfico y las Amenazas Transnacionales, CONAT) is the military command of the National Army of Colombia tasked with air assault operations in the event of an emergency threats requiring military force as a rapid deployment force (RDF), clandestine and covert operations, counterinsurgency in jungle and mountainous areas, counter transnational threats, crime suppression in hard-to-reach areas, maneuver warfare, providing assistance to counternarcotics efforts, providing security in areas at risk of attack or urban terrorism, and support urban counterterrorism.

The command is deployed to jungle and mountainous areas to counterinsurgency where the guerrillas of the National Liberation Army (ELN) have their base of operations.

== Background and establishment ==
The establishment of a military command specialized in the fight against drug trafficking was first envisaged in August 2020 by former Defence Minister Carlos Holmes Trujillo. The establishment of the new command was proposed in order to centralize efforts and actions of existing units.

The Counternarcotics and Transnational Threats Command was established on 26 February 2021 to replace the Special Counternarcotics Brigade and to support the larger Joint Task Force units. The Command is expected to reach the full operational capability in May 2021.

== Mission ==
The Counternarcotics and Transnational Threats Command has been established in order to carry out contrast to drug trafficking, to transnational threats linked to the illegal exploration of minerals, to the trafficking of species and of people, to terrorism.

According the National Army of Colombia, the command is in charge of coordinating interdiction operations, special operations against drug trafficking, including operations against drug traffickers by organized armed groups and related illegal economic activities.

== Organization ==
According to the National Army of Colombia, the Counternarcotics and Transnational Threats Command consists of six subordinate airmobile units:

- Three Special Brigades Against Drug Trafficking (Brigadas Especiales Contra el Narcotráfico): tasked with conducting unified land operations;
- Deployment Force Against Transnational Threats (Fuerza de Despliegue Contra Amenazas Transnacionales): tasked with combating extortion, kidnapping, arms, ammunition and explosives trafficking, and human trafficking;
- Brigade Against Illegal Mining (Brigada Contra la Minería Ilegal): tasked with fighting illegal mining enterprises;
- Intelligence Battalion Against Drug Trafficking and Transnational Threats (Batallón de Inteligencia Contra el Narcotráfico y Amenazas Transnacionales): tasked with information gathering activities.

On its establishment, the command is part of the Air Assault Division and it is led by Brigadier General Juan Carlos Correa Consuegra.

== Controversy ==
The left-leaning, weekly magazine Semanario Voz denounced the establishment of the Counternarcotics and Transnational Threats Command as a preparatory move in order to carry out an attack to Venezuela. This move, according to Semanario Voz, is inspired by the United States of America.

The establishment of the CONAT also drew criticism from Venezuela, with President of Venezuela Nicolas Maduro pledging to “respond forcefully” to any violation of Venezuelan sovereignty.

According to CONAT commander, Brigadier General Juan Carlos Correa Consuegra, the command operates directly and only in Colombian territory and respects the sovereignty of all nations.

Colombia Reports' editor-in-chief, Adriaan Alsema, criticized the establishment of the Counternarcotics and Transnational Threats Command as a move to revive the Plan Colombia and to undermine the Colombian peace process.

== See also ==
- Plan Colombia
