= Saint Thomas Aquinas University =

Private university in Bogotá, Colombia

Saint Thomas University
- Universidad Santo Tomás
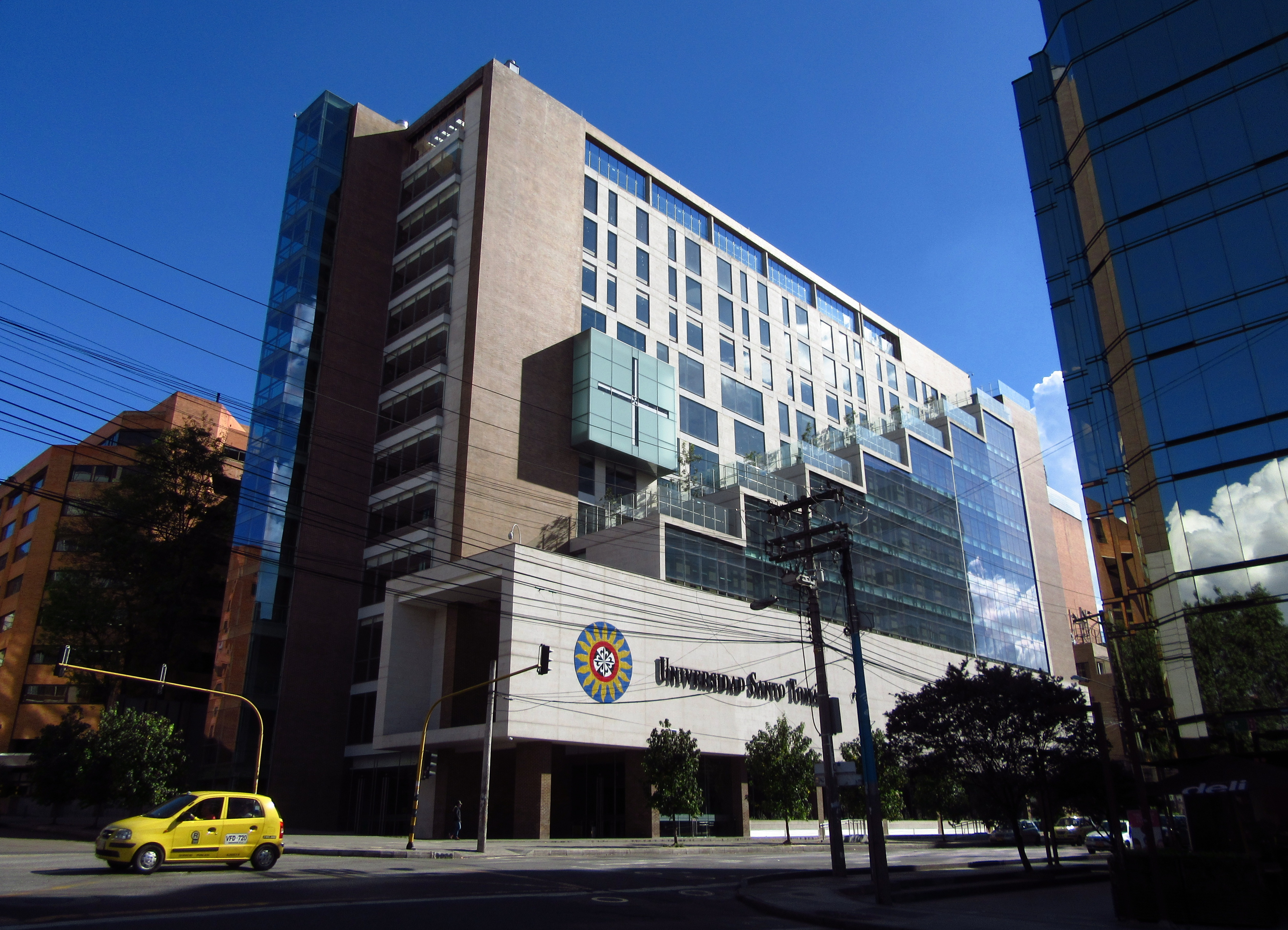
- Motto: Facientes Veritatem (Makers of the Truth)
- Type: Private
- Established: June 13, 1580; 446 years ago
- Affiliations: Catholic
- Principal: Father José Antonio Balaguera Cepedda O.P.
- Students: 22,115
- Location: Carrera 9 Nº 51-11 Sede Central, Bogotá, D.C., Colombia; 4°38′17″N 74°03′52″W
- Nickname: La Santoto
- Website: www.usta.edu.co

Saint Thomas University (Spanish: Universidad Santo Tomás) is a Roman Catholic university located in Bogotá, Colombia. It is the oldest Colombian university, founded in 1580 by the Dominican Order. It has campuses in Bucaramanga, Tunja, Medellín, and Villavicencio, and offers distance education.

== Symbols ==
The Flag: It is composed of five horizontal stripes, three green and two white interspersed, the shield of the University in the central part.

The Seal: It was elaborated to affirm the pontifical origin of the institution with the founding bull "Romanux Pontifex" of 1580, authentic mandate of the Pope Gregorio XIII and is used in certificates and diplomas issued by the University.

Shield: It is formed by the Cross of Calatrava in black and white in the center sixteen golden circular rays, symbol of the sun of Aquino, on a circular blue background and the Latin motto Facientes Veritatem, doers of the truth, in a red band.

The Hymn: It consists of eight verses, makes clear allusion to the humanist and vocational education of the university.

== Notable alumni ==
- Isabel del Carmen Agatón Santander (es), Colombian feminist poet, lawyer, writer and teacher
- Héctor Javier Alarcón Granobles, magistrate of the Colombian Supreme Court of Justice
- Rafael María Baralt, Venezuelan politician
- Francisco José de Caldas, hero of the independence of Colombia
- Doctor Fernando Castillo Cadena, magistrate of the Colombian Supreme Court of Justice
- Santiago Castro-Gómez, Colombian philosopher, professor at the Pontificia Universidad Javeriana and the director of the Pensar Institute in Bogotá
- Helga Díaz, Colombian actress
- Jorge García Usta, Colombian poet and writer
- Atanasio Girardot, hero of the independence of Colombia
- Luis Miguel Bermúdez Gutiérrez, Grand Teacher award 2017
- Mirtha Patricia Linares Prieto, president of the Jurisdicción Especial para la Paz (JEP)
- Pablo Montoya, Colombian writer
- Pablo José Montoya Campuzano, Colombian novelist, poet, essayist, translator, critic and professor of literature.
- Elsy del Pilar Cuello, Supreme Court judge
- Alexandra Moreno Piraquive, Colombian lawyer and politician
- Alejandro Ordoñez Maldonado (es), ambassador of Colombia to the OAS
- César Augusto Reyes Medina, magistrate of the Colombian Supreme Court of Justice
- Andrés Rosillo y Meruelo (es), hero of the independence of Colombia.
- José María Samper, Colombian politician
- Francisco de Paula Santander, hero of the independence of Colombia
- Didier Alberto Tavera Amado, Colombian lawyer and politician
- Camilo Torres Tenorio, hero of the independence of Colombia
- Tomás Alfonso Zuleta Díaz, Colombian singer and songwriter

== See also ==
- List of colonial universities in Latin America
