= Isabel Agatón Santander =

Colombian poet, lawyer, writer and feminist

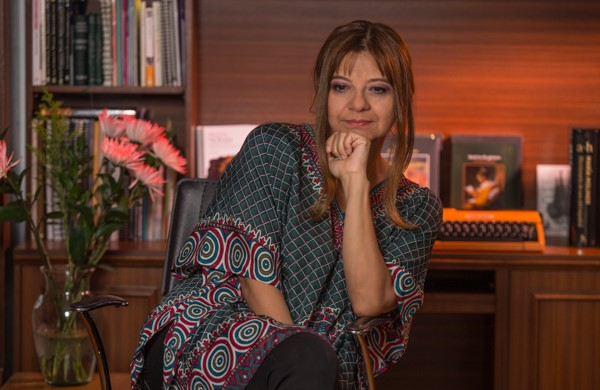
- Backcover photograph of Por fin el silencio
- Born: March 22, 1969 (age 56); Bogotá, Colombia
- Education: Universidad Santo Tomás
- Occupation(s): Lawyer, writer, poet
- Years active: 1991 – present

Isabel Agatón Santander (born March 22, 1969) is a Colombian poet, lawyer, writer and feminist. Promoter of the Rosa Elvira Cely Law (Law 1761 of 2015) which defines femicide as a crime in Colombia, she integrated the editorial commission of Law 1257 of 2008 about violence against women. She was a judge in the Tribunales de Conciencia de Justicia Para las Mujeres in Nicaragua (2015) and El Salvador (2014 and 2015) in which they tried cases of sexual violence and femicide convened by the Red Feminista frente a la Violencia contra las Mujeres (REDFEM) (Feminist Network Front against the Violence against Women) and the Red contra Violencia (Network against Violence) of the respective countries.

== Career ==
Isabel Agatón Santander obtained a master's degree in law from the Universidad Nacional de Colombia, specializing in Human Rights and Administrative Rights. She has been a teacher of Mastery and Specialization of General Matters in the School of General Studies at the Universidad Nacional de Colombia. She participated in the process of consulting and revision for the development of the Modelo de protocolo latinoamericano de investigación de las muertes violentas de mujeres por razones de género (femicidio/feminicidio) of the Office of the United Nations High Commissioner for Human Rights for Central America in 2013.

She is the cofounder and director of the Centro de Investigación en Justicia y Estudios Críticos del Derecho (Center of Investigation in Justice and Critical Studies of the Law), CIJUSTICIA, an organization awarded with the Orden a la Mujer y la Democracia Policarpa Salavarrieta por la Comisión de Equidad para la Mujer of the Congress of Colombia in March 2013, for the defense of women's rights in Colombia.

== Works ==
- Por fin el silencio. Antología poética (2018), poetry anthology, IAS Editora
- Si Adelita se fuera con otro: Del feminicidio y otros asuntos (2017), Editorial TEMIS
- Justicia de Genero: un asunto necesario (2013), Editorial TEMIS
- Astrimelias Amarillas o Veinte poemas de amor y un silencio deseperado (2007), IAS Editora
- Poemas a parte (2005), IAS Editora
- El tiempo de los girasoles (2003), IAS Editora

== Recognition ==
- One of the people who developed great changes in Colombia during the past 35 years (Revista Semana, 2017)
- Person of the year 2017 (El Espectador, Colombia)
- Person of the year 2017 (Caracol Radio, Colombia)
