= Jorge García Usta =

Colombian novelist (1960–2005)

- Born: January 13, 1960; Montería
- Died: December 25, 2005 (aged 45); Cartagena
- Education: Saint Thomas Aquinas University
- Partner: Rocío García
- Children: Alejandro García García (b. 1990); Esteban García García (b. 1997)
- Writing career
- Genres: novels, poetry, essays

Jorge García Usta (January 13, 1960 – December 25, 2005) was a Colombian novelist, poet, essayist and journalist.

== Biography ==
García was born in the San Jerónimo hospital of Montería as grandson of Syro-Lebanese immigrants, and was son of the physician José Antonio García Schotborgh and his wife Nevija Usta Zaruf, who lived in Ciénaga de Oro. When he was three years old, his father died in Puebla, Mexico, his mother died in 1988. In 1979 he matriculated at Universidad de Cartagena, where he lectured later, to study law, but soon changed to Saint Thomas Aquinas University, where he did his studies of philosophy and literature. In 1989 he married Rocío García.

García worked for several Colombian journals and was president of the Circle of Journalists in Cartagena (Spanish: Círculo de Periodistas de Cartagena and of the Cultural Foundation Héctor Rojas Herazo. In 1984 he was awarded with the national León de Greiff poetry award. Due to a cerebral disease he died in the hospital of Bocagrande.

== Selected works ==
- Noticias desde la otra orilla, poetry, 1985
- El libro de las crónicas, poetry, 1989
- El reino errante: poemas de la migración y el mundo árabes, poetry, 1991
- Monteadentro, poetry, 1992
- La tribu interior, poetry, 1995
- Noticias de un animal antiguo, poetry, 2001
