= National Army of Colombia =

- Ejercito Nacional de Colombia
- Coat of Arms of the National Army of Colombia
- Founded: 7 August 1819 (207 years, 2 months and 22 days)
- Country: Colombia
- Type: Army
- Role: Land warfare
- Size: 361,420 active personnel (Note: Figure as of 2020.); 1,687,163 reserve personnel (Note: Figure as of 2020.)
- Part of: Military Forces of Colombia
- Garrison/HQ: Comando del Ejército; Bogota D.C., Colombia
- Mottos: Patria, Honor, Lealtad "Homeland, Honor, Loyalty"
- Colors: Red with Army Crest
- March: Himno del Ejército "Army Anthem"
- Anniversaries: August 7 (Battle of Boyacá)
- Engagements: Colombian Independence War; Gran Colombia–Peru War; Ecuadorian–Colombian War; Thousand Days War; Leticia Incident; Korean War; Colombian Armed Conflict; Operation Traira; Catatumbo campaign
- Website: www.ejercito.mil.co

Commanders
- Commander-in-Chief: President Abelardo de la Espriella
- Commander: General José Bertulfo Soto Sánchez
- Notable commanders: Simon Bolivar, Francisco de Paula Santander, Gustavo Rojas Pinilla, Harold Bedoya Pizarro, Manuel José Bonnet; Rafael Reyes Prieto

Insignia
- Flag

The National Army of Colombia (Spanish: Ejército Nacional de Colombia) is the land warfare service branch of the Military Forces of Colombia. With over 361,420 active personnel as of 2020, it is the largest and oldest service branch in Colombia, and is the second largest army in the Americas after the United States and before Brazil.

It is headed by the Commandant of the National Army (Comandante del Ejército Nacional), falls under the authority of the Commandant General of the Military Forces (Comandante General de las Fuerzas Militares), and is supervised by the Ministry of National Defense, which answers to the President of Colombia.

The modern Colombian Army has its roots in the Army of the Commoners (Ejército de los Comuneros), which was formed on 7 August 1819 – before the establishment of the present day Colombia – to meet the demands of the Revolutionary War against the Spanish Empire. After their triumph against the Spanish, the Army of the Commoners disbanded, and the Congress of Angostura created the Gran Colombian Army to replace it. Throughout its history, the Colombian Army has seen action in several wars and civil conflicts, including the Gran Colombia-Peru War, the Ecuadorian–Colombian War, the Thousand Days War, and the Korean War. Since the mid-1960s, the Colombian Army has been involved in a low-intensity asymmetrical war known as the Colombian Armed Conflict.

== Mission ==
The mission statement of the Colombian Army is to conduct military operations oriented towards defending the sovereignty, independence, and territorial integrity (of the nation), and protecting the civilian population, and private and state resources, to contribute in generating an environment of peace, security, and development, that guarantees the constitutional order of the nation.

== History ==
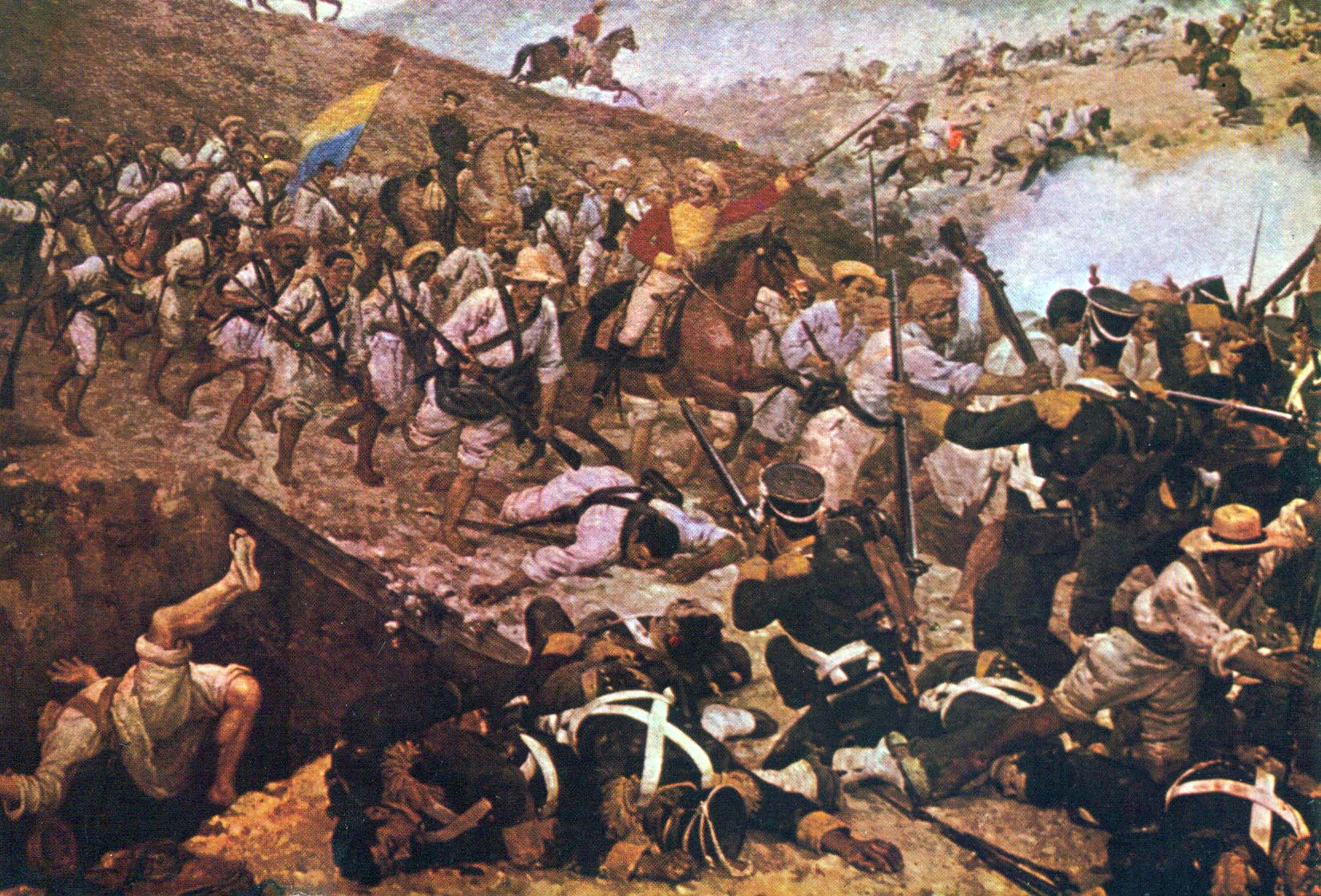
The Battle of Boyacá in 1819 was the decisive battle that ensured Colombia's independence from Spain and the establishment of Gran Colombia

The Colombian Army traces its history back to the Army of the Commoners – the revolutionary army made up of peasants, llaneros, and other such militiamen during the days of the Colombian War of Independence.

=== Pre-Hispanic ===
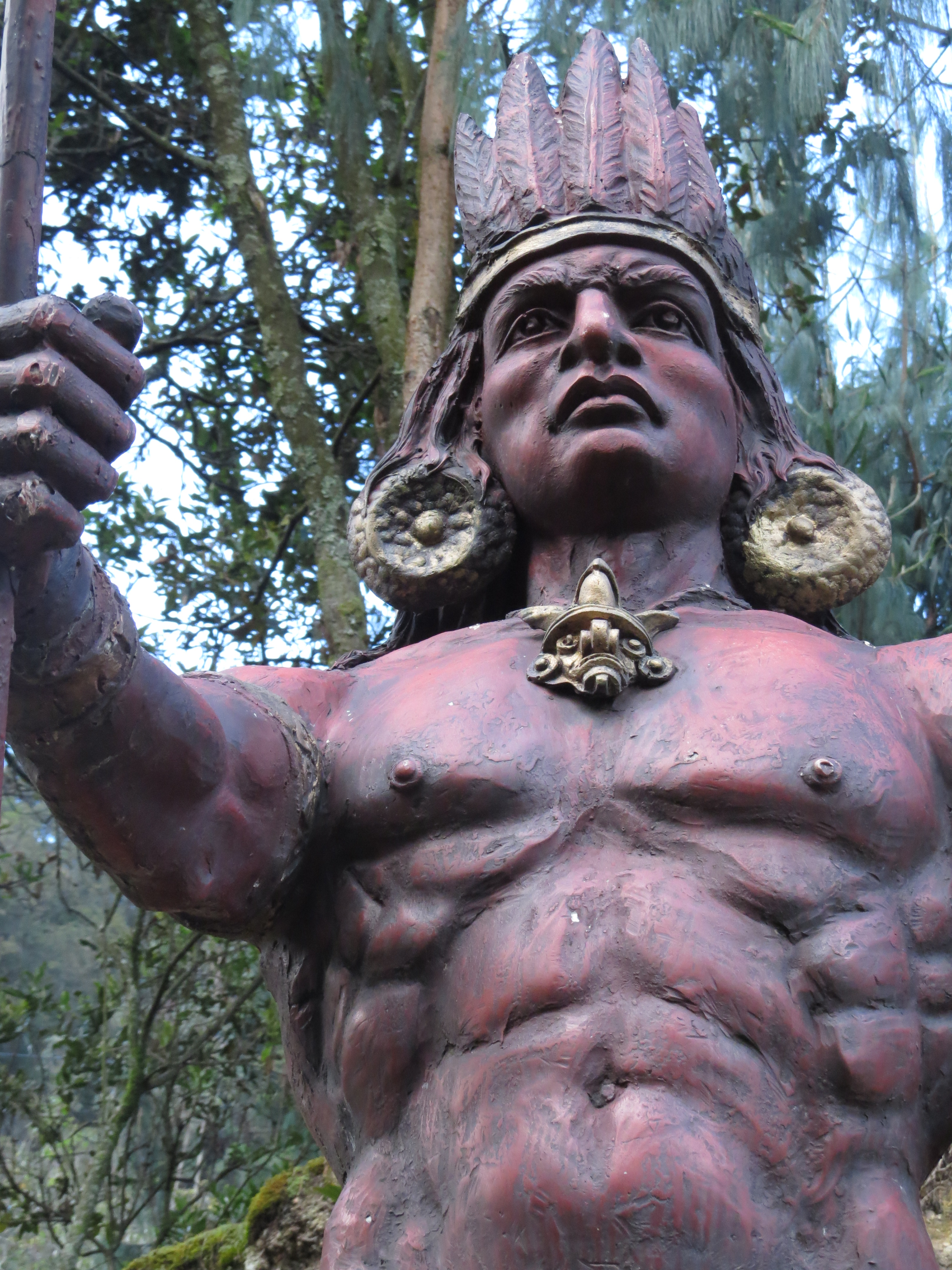
Statue of a Guecha Warrior in Colombia.

During Pre-Hispanic times, the Muisca army carried clubs, darts, spears, bows and arrows, and slingshots. Guecha warriors were allowed to wear feathered crowns and golden jewels, unlike the common man in the Muisca Confederation. The Muisca usually fought against other neighboring tribes, like in the Battle of Pasca, or the Southern Muisca against the Northern Muisca, like in the Battle of Chocontá. Army sizes ranged from around 100 to 60,000.

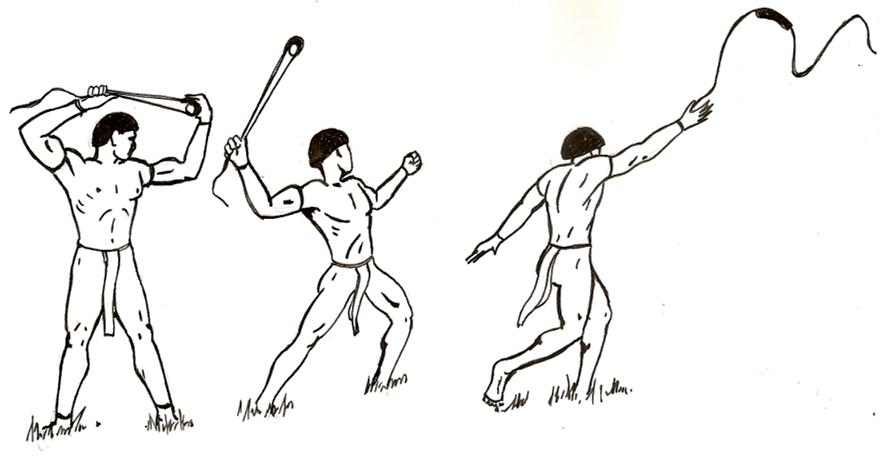
The warriors threw their stones with slings when hunting or battling

=== Independence ===
On 20 July 1810, following a long period of political instability within the Spanish Crown due to the Peninsular War, in the territory of present-day Colombia, many cities and provinces across the country set up their own autonomous juntas, that derived in the popular sovereignty and independence against the Spanish Empire. A period of nationwide instability and conflict known as the Foolish Fatherland broke out from 1810 to 1816, between federalists and centralists. Due to Colombia's challenging geography and the lack of communication between many provinces and cities, the juntas declared themselves sovereign from each other. This fragmentation prevented the proper establishment of a regular army, and it would take nine years before a truly national army would be formed. During this prolonged period of struggling consolidation, the Spanish Crown took advantage of the national disunity, and launched a military campaign in 1816, led by General Pablo Morillo to reassert the authority of the Spanish Empire over its previous holdings. The United Provinces of New Granada tried to resist with an army under the command of Antonio Baraya and Custodio García Rovira, but were defeated by the Spanish forces at the Battle of La Cuchilla del Tambo and the Battle of La Plata (1816) effectively reestablishing Spanish rule in New Granada. With New Granada once again under control of the Spanish, Morillo launched a campaign known as El Terror by executing many of the leaders of the independence movement – often in public squares – who supported Simón Bolívar's Guerra a muerte. The Gran Colombian Army was consolidated on August 7, 1819, following the defeat of the royalist army under command of Barreiro at the Battle of Boyacá against the Patriot army under the command of Simón Bolívar.

=== 19th Century and civil wars (1819–1903) ===
With independence gained after the defeat of the Spanish Royalist forces at the Battle of Boyacá in 1819, the republic of Gran Colombia was established by the Constitution of Cúcuta in 1821, with its capital in Bogotá. There upon the Gran Colombian Army was formed.

==== Gran Colombia – Peru war ====
In 1828 a war broke out with Peru and the Gran Colombian Army was called upon to defend the nation's sovereignty. The war lasted into 1829 with a Peruvian naval victory, but the Colombians were victorious on land with the crushing of the Peruvian invasion force at the Battle of Tarqui. The war ended in a stalemate.

==== Civil wars (1830–1903) ====
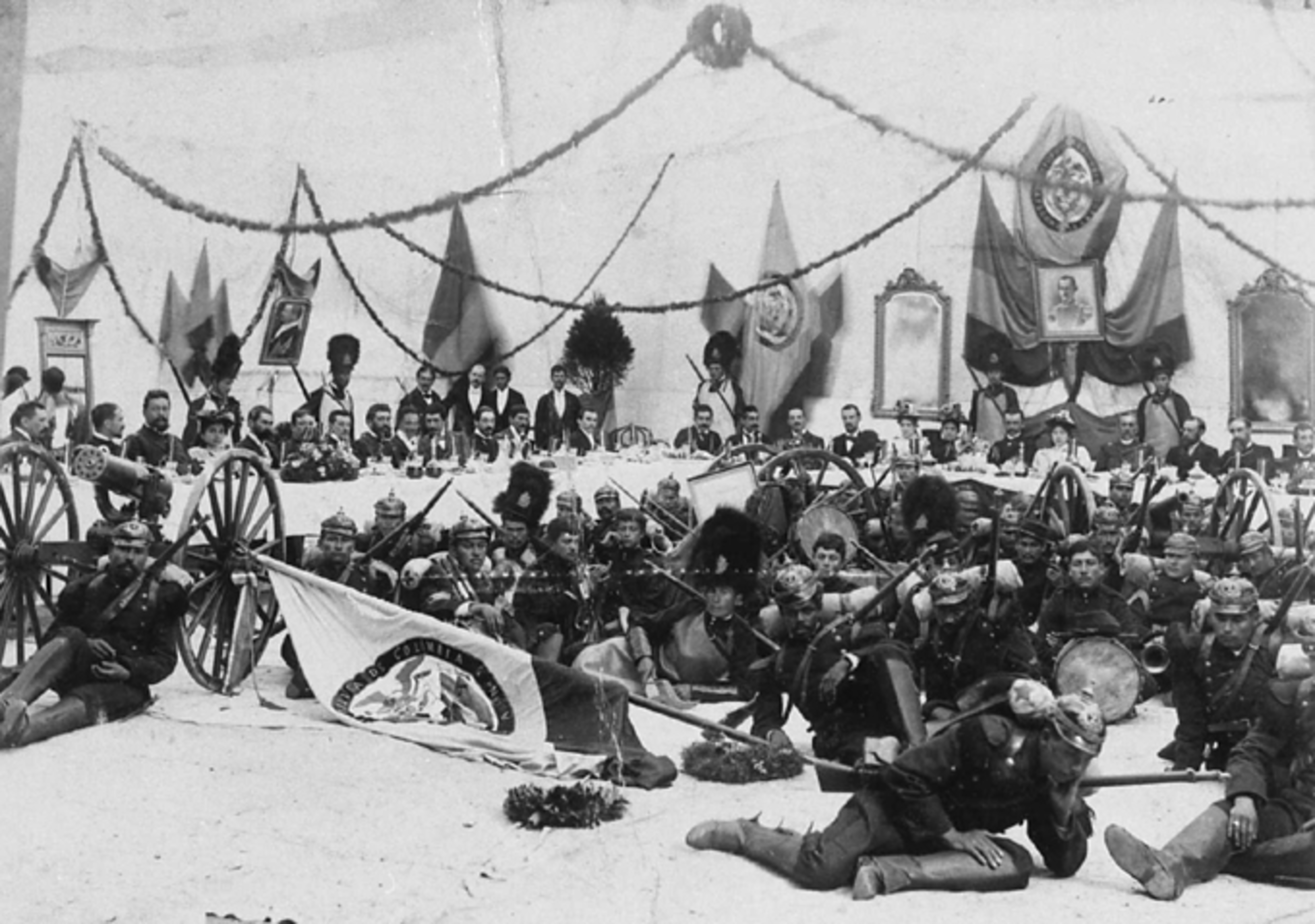
Colombian Troops in a banquet during the Thousand Days War

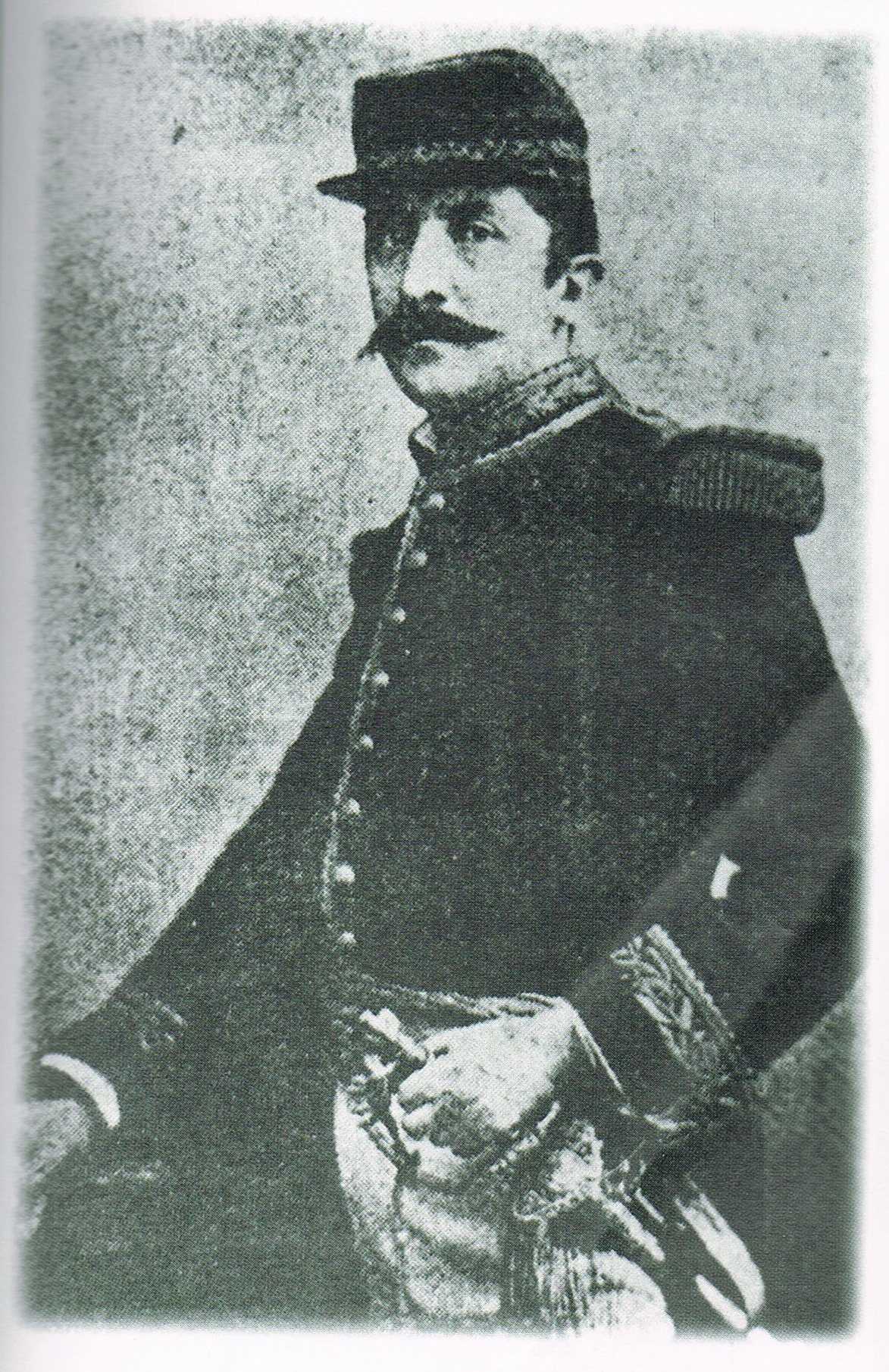
Future president of Colombia General Rafael Reyes Prieto in 1886

After the dissolution in 1830 of Gran Colombia and the death of Bolivar, the Army of the new New Granada had been involved in war and civil war without being able to progress or modernize. Its officers were not well trained or technically skilled. The government addressed this by founding and organizing military schools and colleges, but was hampered by the constant civil wars that financially drained the country's economy. In 1839 General Tomas Cipriano de Mosquera hired Italian Colonel Agustin Códazzi as an inspector of the army. As a consequence of these civil wars over partisan affairs, the chiefs and officers began to be involved in politics. The need to professionalize and retrain the army prompted the creation of a military school, which was created in 1887. In order to reorganize the army, the government hired a French military mission. Its mission was fruitful and the organization along French lines based on divisions, regiments and battalions was implemented in the country. Unfortunately another civil war, perhaps the most devastating of them all, the Thousand Days War, was declared on October 8, 1899, and did not allow the retraining and education of officers and commanders. This civil war lasted until 1903. With the ending of the Thousand Days War, General Rafael Reyes Prieto was elected President of Colombia with many ambitious plans to reorganize and professionalize the army. The first thing he did was to reduce troop numbers drastically: the army at the time had an estimated 80,000 troops who were poorly equipped, poorly trained, poorly dressed and very malnourished. Also the army lacked professionalism and sense of duty to the country and never acted as a national army, acting instead as militias and armed factions led by Commanders who had their own political agendas.

==== Military reform of 1907 ====
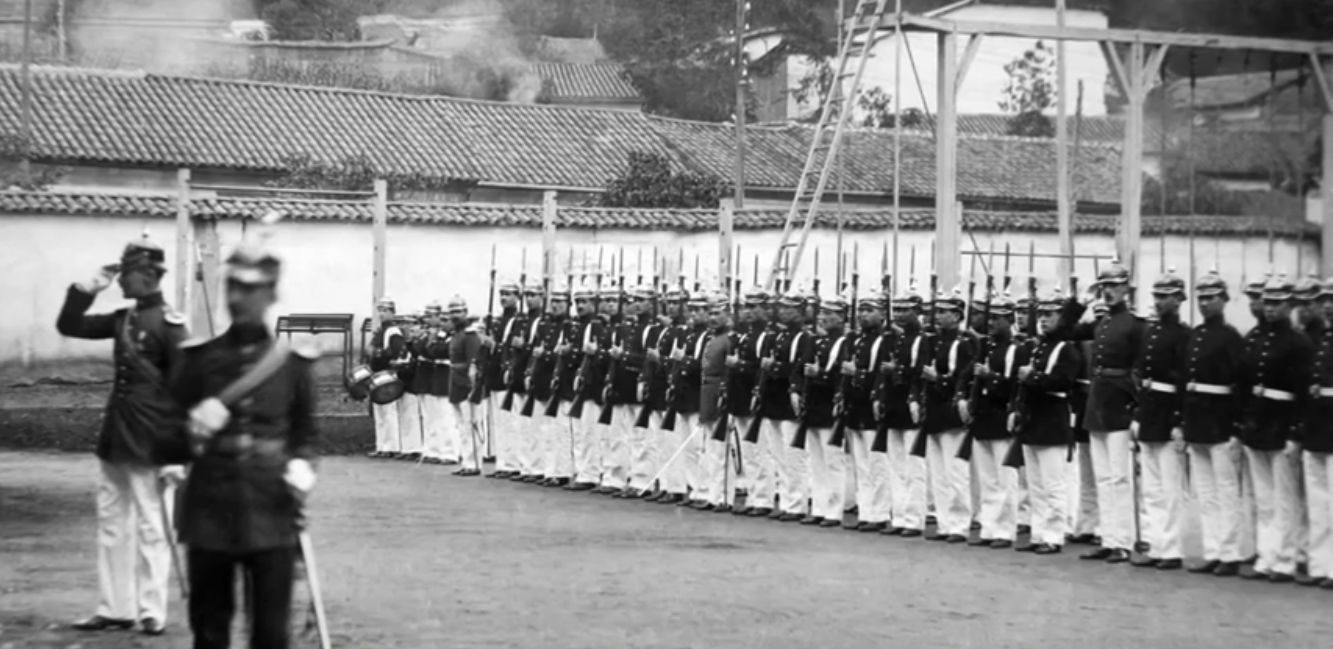
Colombian cadets circa 1910 wearing Prussian inspired uniforms introduced by the Chilean military mission

Current parade uniform used by the Colombian Military Academy with the distinctive Prussian "Pickelhaube", demonstrating the Chilean Military Mission's influence on the academy is still present

In 1907 a military reform was carried out by President Rafael Reyes Prieto right in the aftermath of the Thousand Days War which had devastated the country economically and morally. The ministry of war hired a Chilean military mission to advise the ministry on how to professionalize the army. This led to the creation of the Colombian Military School in June 1907. The Army was then dramatically reorganized under the guise of the Chilean military mission, the Chilean army which had adopted Prussian military doctrine and uniforms since 1886 did the same to the Colombian army as Colombian troops began using Prussian military uniforms and doctrine, which is still present today in the Colombian Military Academy with ceremonial uniforms being of Prussian influence and the use of Pickelhaube helmets. The Chileans reorganized the Colombian Army into Divisions made up of a divisional HQ, 3 Infantry regiments,1 Artillery regiment, and 1 Cavalry regiment each, meanwhile, military engineers were grouped with the Infantry regiments. This military reform allowed the Colombian army to become professionalized and a truly National army was established. The army remained under the influence of the Chilean military mission until the mission left in 1914. Colombia remained neutral during World War I but did watch how the conflict progressed and sent military attachés to Europe after the war to study new technological advancements in aviation, infantry, cavalry, engineering and training methods.

=== The Leticia Incident and the 1930s ===
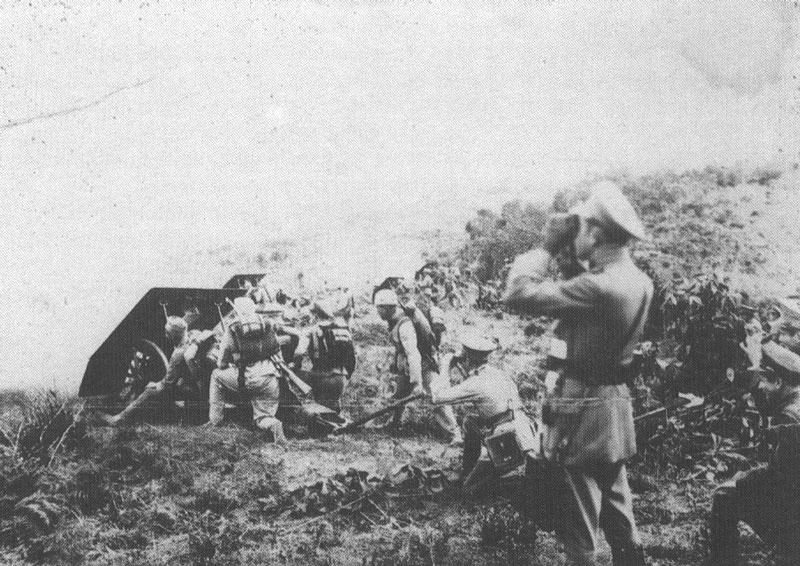
Colombian Army making maneuvers to counter Peruvian attack

In 1926 the Colombian Government hired another military mission, this time from Switzerland, to reorganize the army again. As a result of this new combined brigades were implemented.

In late 1932 an armed band of Peruvian civilians and soldiers (supposedly acting without Peruvian government approval) took the Amazonian town of Leticia and forced the Colombian residents to flee. The Peruvian President tried to disassociate himself from these actions, but popular opinion quickly forced him to support the seizure of Leticia. The Colombian government responded forcefully, sending an expeditionary force which defeated the Peruvians and retook Leticia. The war led to an explosion of Colombian patriotism. In the Battle of Güepí 1000 Colombian troops attacked 200 entrenched Peruvian troops and took control of the sector with the Peruvians abandoning their positions.

The League of Nations was asked to mediate with the support of Brazilian diplomats, and eventually oversaw the peaceful return of the area to Colombian control. The process generated an interesting historical precedent: for the first time ever, soldiers wore the armband of an international organization (the League of Nations) as they performed peacekeeping duties. The soldiers were Colombian, and the use of the League armbands was primarily a face-saving device to permit the Peruvians to leave without appearing to submit to the Colombians. Nevertheless, the use of these 75 Colombian soldiers as international peacekeepers was an antecedent of United Nations peacekeeping several decades later.

During the latter part of the 1930s, Colombia began buying more German war material and the German Stahlhelm helmet became the standard-issue helmet for all Colombian troops until the 1950s.

=== 1940s–1950s ===
On the outbreak of Second World War in September 1939, Colombia, in accordance with its international policy, declared itself a belligerent, as did many other Latin American countries, and received arms and equipment from the United States as part of the Lend Lease program. The first American military missions arrived in the country, and Colombian officials were sent to the United States to perfect their knowledge; as a result of these links a new doctrine was adopted in the military forces. After the war, the army continued to receive assistance from American missions, and officers attended courses in the United States. Political changes in the country starting in 1946 led up to the civil war known as la Violencia, which started with the El Bogotazo riots of April 9, 1948. The army then became involved in the restoration of public order.

=== Recent history ===
The Colombian Army is presently at war with leftist rebels of the FARC, ELN and EPL, as well as other minor rebellious groups. Members of the military have been accused or condemned of collaborating with the activities of right-wing paramilitaries, such as the AUC and others. The BBC and other sources have reported on cases of corruption within the military, as well as other scandals. However, the army has taken measures to become a transparent and professional fighting force.

On June 22, 2026, President Gustavo Petro announced Colombia’s largest military modernization package in decades, valued at over $12 billion (approximately 40 trillion Colombian pesos). Designed to shift the nation's military focus from internal security toward conventional territorial defense, the comprehensive plan spans all branches of the armed forces. The core of the package is a $4.3 billion contract with Sweden's Saab for 17 Gripen E/F fighter jets which are scheduled for delivery between 2026 and 2032 to replace the Air Force's aging 1980s-era IAI Kfir fleet, alongside 46 new helicopters and up to 94 naval patrol and coastal vessels.

The initiative heavily emphasizes domestic defense production and technology transfer. Land force upgrades include 127 tactical armored vehicles and 111,000 new rifles, centered around the 5.56mm Miranda rifle, a domestically designed weapon by state manufacturer INDUMIL intended to replace over 400,000 veteran Galil rifles starting in 2026. The plan also allocates roughly 1 trillion pesos for a "National Anti-Drone Shield" consisting of 17,000 communications and jamming units in response to recent insurgent attacks on military installations. However, while the Gripen deal represents a firm commitment, much of the remaining proposal remains an intention to be structured before the end of Petro's term, with long-term execution subject to future budget allocations and administrative shifts.

==== Plan Colombia and modernization ====
The United States government approved the Plan Colombia initiative in the late 1990s. Part of the resources provided by this initiative would be directed to the support of the Colombian Army by strengthening its combat and logistics capabilities. This Plan greatly benefited the Colombian Army. During the 1990s with the guerrillas gaining more money than ever due to controlling large portions of the drug trade, the FARC began changing their tactics and went from guerrilla warfare to a war of large movements and large attacks where large numbers of guerrillas would combine their forces to capture towns and cities. With the aid received from Plan Colombia, then commander of the armed forces General Fernando Tapias led an internal purification in the army that had the support of the other force commanders and the government. This process contributed to improving substantially the problematic relationship the country had previously had with the United States. This was the beginning of the modernization of the army: Colombian soldiers began receiving the training and technology to confront the guerrillas head-on. With the buying of American Black Hawk helicopters, they learned to deploy quickly into rugged guerrilla terrain. Technical equipment was improved drastically with the US providing satellite-guided bomb “kits” to the Colombian army which also made the Colombian army the first military force in South America to utilize these "smart bombs". With the aid of these bombs the army killed more than two dozen FARC commanders, including Mono Jojoy. With training improved and better equipment the Colombian people now have high regards for the army and internationally they are widely viewed as Latin America's best-prepared and most professional army.

==== Operation Jaque ====
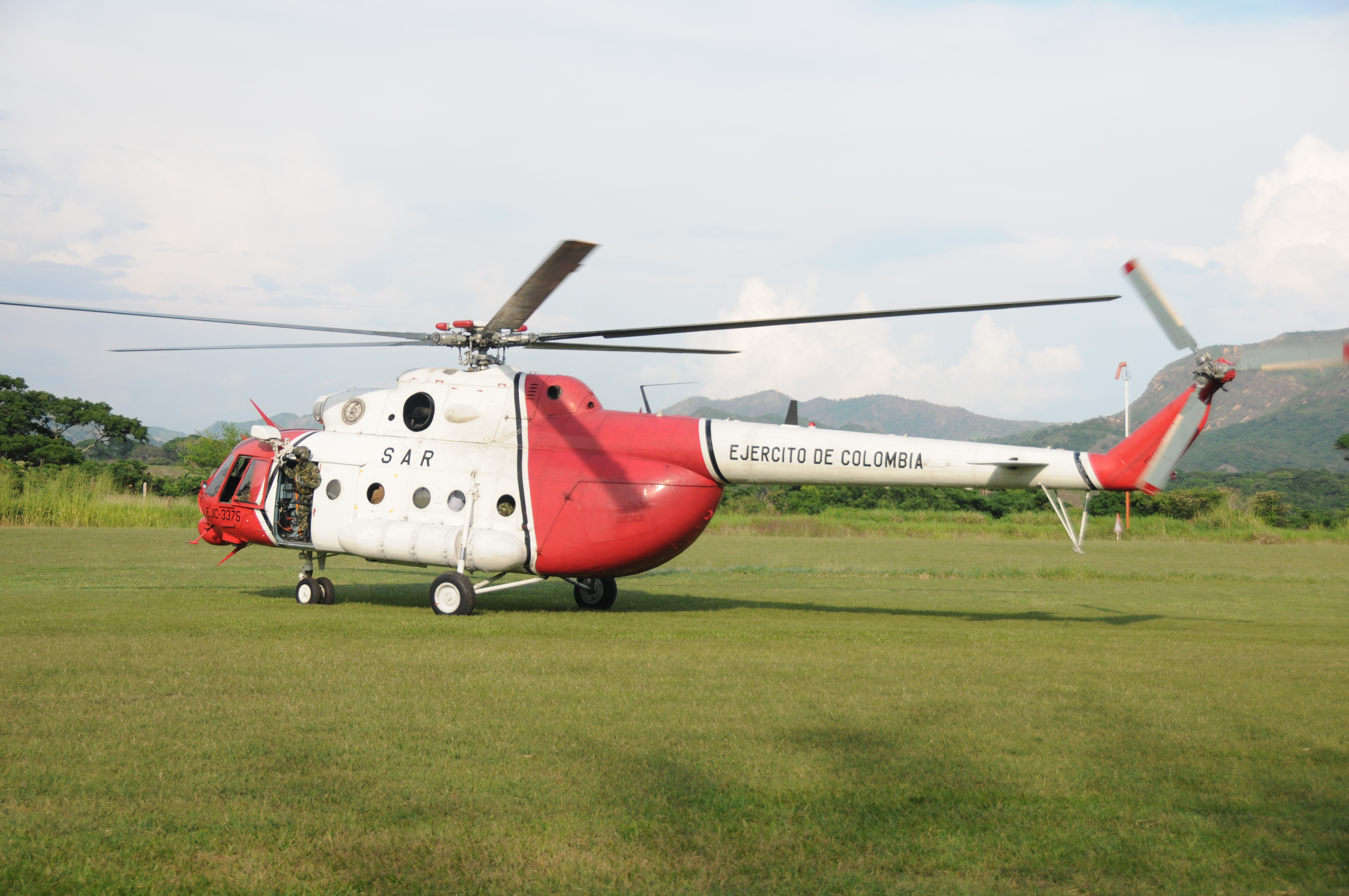
This Mi-17 was one of the two helicopters that participated in the Operation it has been given the name: Libertad Uno (Liberty One)

The Colombian Army carried out Operation Jaque, a military operation that resulted in the rescue of 15 hostages, including former Colombian presidential candidate Íngrid Betancourt. The hostages had been held by the FARC. The operation took place on July 2, 2008, along the Apaporis River in Guaviare Department. It was unprecedented in the army's history, in that the intelligence gathering for the operation involved the army placing a mole within the FARC itself for one year or more before the operation. The plan involved tricking FARC rebels into handing over the hostages by having Colombian soldiers pose as members of a fictitious non-government organisation that supposedly would fly the captives to a camp to meet rebel leader Alfonso Cano. Several aspects of the mission were apparently designed to mimic previous Venezuelan hostage transfers, including the actual composition of the group and the type and markings of the helicopters used. Two Mi-17 helicopters came to the landing area in Guaviare, where one, carrying Colombian agents wearing Che Guevara T-shirts, landed to pick up the hostages. The hostages were handcuffed and loaded aboard, and the local FARC commander César and an additional rebel also boarded the helicopters. They were then subdued by Colombian forces. Betancourt realised she was being rescued only when she saw her captor naked and blindfolded on the floor of the aircraft.

==== Lancero Course ====
One of the more demanding courses run by the Colombian Army is the Lancero School. This course – dedicated to counterinsurgency warfare – is held in Tolemaida, 150 miles (240 km) from Bogotá, where temperatures range between 85 and 100 degrees F. (29.5–38 degrees C.) throughout the year, with U.S. military instructors also playing a role. The course lasts 73 days and trains Bolivian, Ecuadorean, and Panamanian troops as well as Colombian soldiers; some French and American soldiers are also trained there. The course, founded in 1955, was based on the methodology of the United States Army Ranger School. Lethal techniques and live ammunition are used.

=== Overseas military operations ===
==== Korean War ====
Batallon Colombia ensign designed for the Korean War.

During the Korean War, some 4,314 troops of the Colombian Army (21% of the total force) served in the Colombian Battalion in the United Nations Command. The initial contingent of troops transported to Korea aboard the USNS Aiken Victory. Once in-country, the Colombian Battalion received training and then joined the American 21st Infantry Regiment on 1 August 1951. It was engaged in battle during Operation Nomadic, for which the battalion received a Presidential Unit Citation. In 1952, as the 21st Infantry Regiment redeployed, the Colombian Battalion was transferred to the 31st Infantry Regiment. The battalion was greatly involved in the Battle of Old Baldy. Colombian soldiers killed in action were sometimes cremated at the United Nations Cemetery in Tanggok and repatriated in 1954. Four different Colombian battalions rotated to Korea. Overall, the Colombian Army lost 141 soldiers by death and suffered 556 battle injuries.

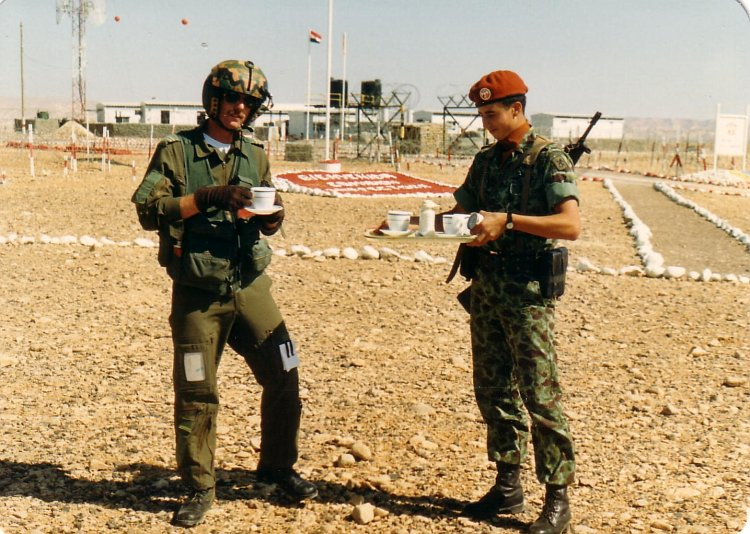
A Colombian MFO soldier hosts a Canadian helicopter pilot 1989. The Colombian is wearing the distinctive terracotta-colored beret that is unique to the MFO.

==== Sinai ====
The Colombian National Army deployed soldiers in the Sinai as part of the United Nations Emergency Force following the Suez Crisis in and until the Six-Day War in 1967. Since 1980 it has supplied one battalion ('COLBATT') to the Multinational Force and Observers there.

== Organization ==
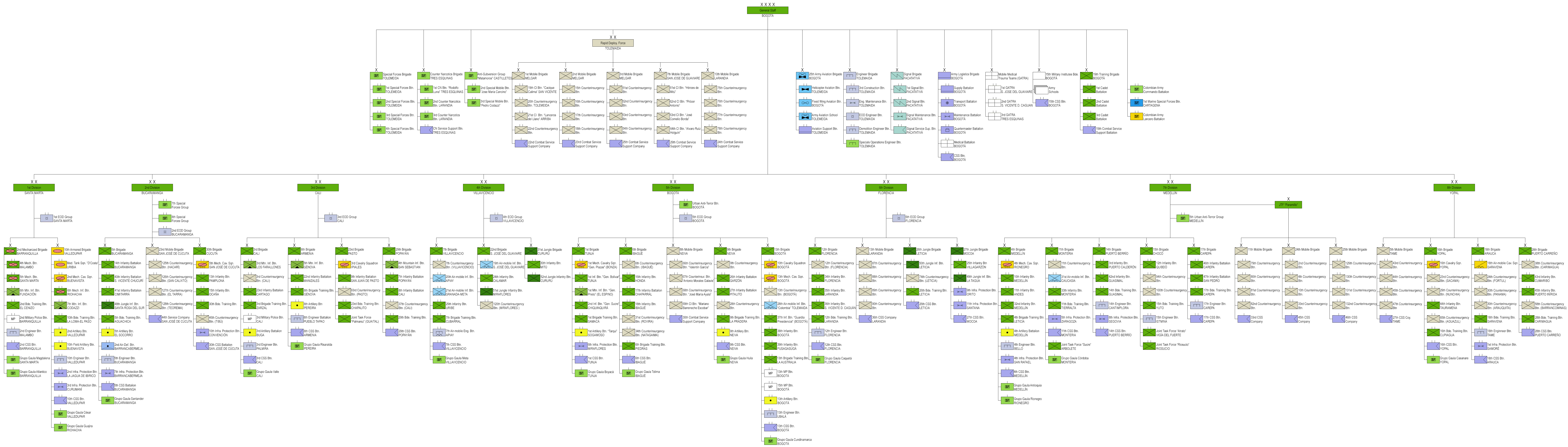
Structure of the Colombian National Army

=== Major units ===
==== Divisions ====
Colombian Army Divisions are static Regional Commands

- 1st Division (Santa Marta) – Its jurisdiction covers the Northern Region of Colombia in which there are the departments of Cesar, La Guajira, Magdalena, Sucre, Bolívar and Atlántico. 2nd Mechanized and 10th Armored brigades.
- 2nd Division (Bucaramanga) – Its jurisdiction covers the north eastern Colombia in which there are the departments of Norte de Santander, Santander and Arauca. 5th Infantry, 30th Infantry and 23rd Mobile brigades.
- 3rd Division (Cali) – Its jurisdiction covers the South West of Colombia in which there are the Departments of Nariño, Valle del Cauca, Cauca, Caldas, Quindio, Risaralda and the southern part of the Chocó. 3rd, 8th, 23rd and 29th Infantry brigades.
- 4th Division (Villavicencio) – Its jurisdiction covers the eastern region of Colombia in which there are the departments of Meta, Guaviare, and part of Vaupés. 7th Infantry, 22nd Infantry and 31st Jungle Infantry brigades.
- 5th Division (Bogota) – Its jurisdiction covers the Central Region of Colombia in which there are the departments of Cundinamarca, Boyaca, Huila and Tolima. 1st Infantry, 6th Infantry, 8th Mobile, 9th Infantry and 13th Infantry brigades.
- 6th Division (Florencia) – Its jurisdiction covers the southern region of Colombia in which there are the departments of Amazonas, Caquetá, Putumayo and southern Vaupés. 12th Infantry, 13th Mobile, 26th Jungle and 27th Jungle brigades.
- 7th Division (Medellin) – Its jurisdiction covers the western region of Colombia in which there are the departments of Cordoba, Antioquia, and part of the Chocó. 4th, 11th, 14th, 15th and 17th Infantry and 11th Mobile Brigades
- 8th Division (Yopal) – Its jurisdiction covers the northeastern region of Colombia: the Departments of Casanare, Arauca, Vichada, Guainía, and the municipalities of Boyaca of Cubará, Pisba, Paya, Labranzagrande and Pajarito. 16th, 18th, 28th, and the 5th Mobile Brigade.

==== Other units ====
- Mobile Medical Command with 3 Battalions
- Military Education and Training Command
- 19th Cadet Brigade with 3 battalions
- Army Aviation Division with 135 helicopters and aircraft.
- Army Special Forces Division

=== Combat arms ===
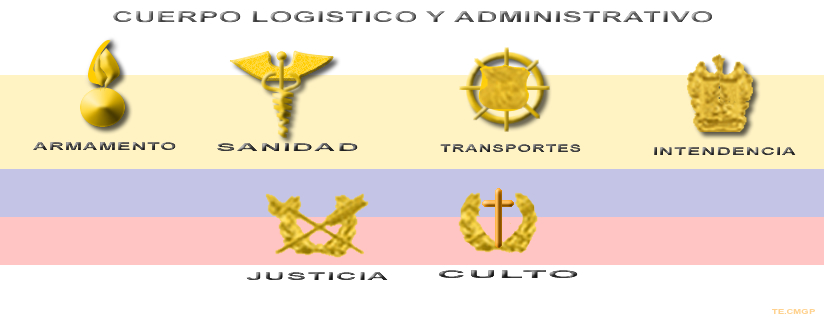
Logistic and administrative corp of Colombian Army

- Infantry (Infantería)
- Cavalry (Caballería)
- Artillery (Artillería)
- Engineers (Ingenieros)
- Intelligence (Inteligencia)
- Communications (Comunicaciones)
- Logistics and Administrative Corps (Cuerpo Logístico y Administrativo)
- Aviation (Aviación)

=== Special units ===
As a result of several iterative modernization efforts, the Colombian Army has also created several distinct brigades and special operations groups, whose tasks range widely, from Presidential guard duties, to Rapid Aerial Deployment, to Hostage Rescue, to Anti-narcotics operations, and more.

==== Presidential Guard ====
Presidential Guard emblem

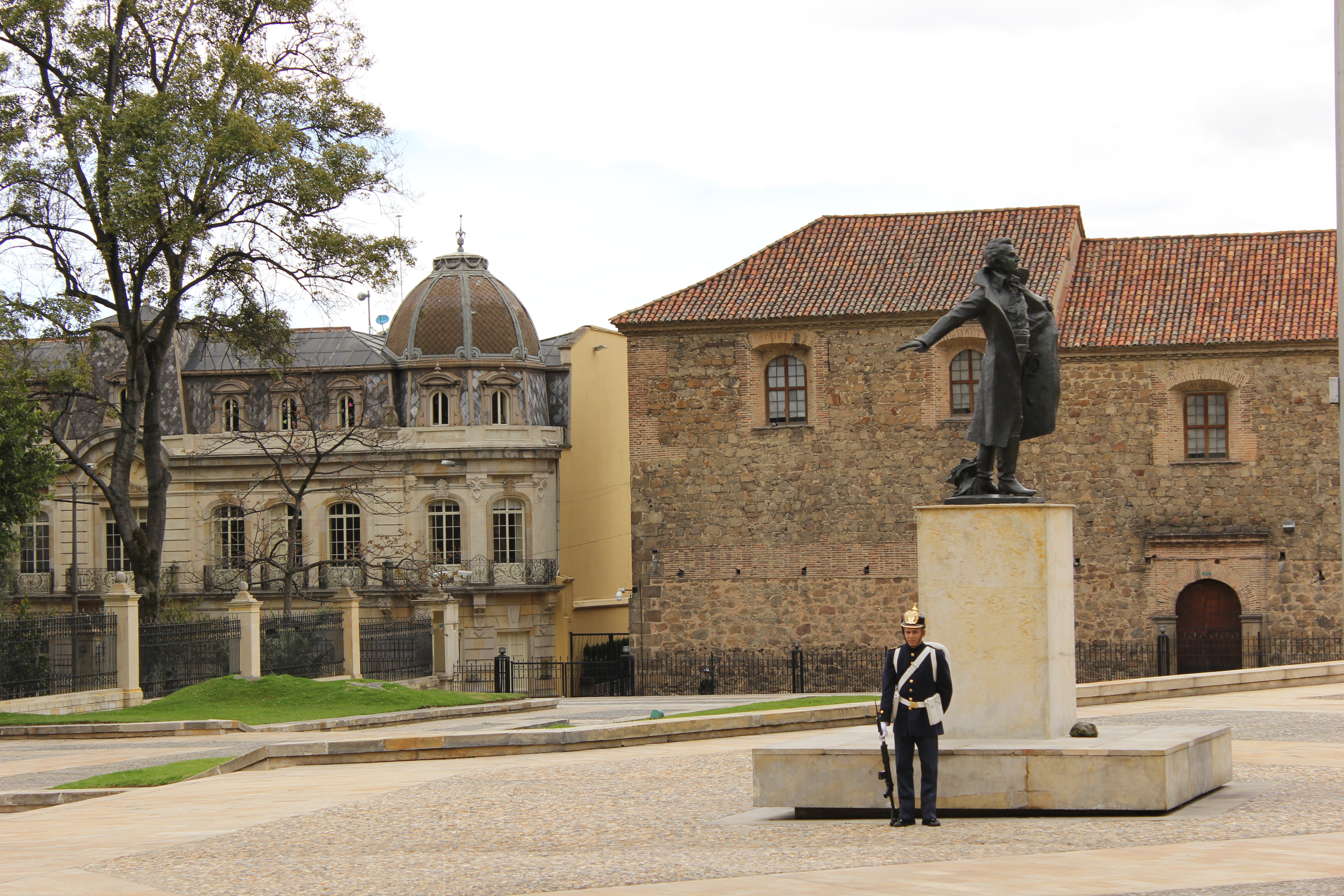
Guardsman at Narino Palace.

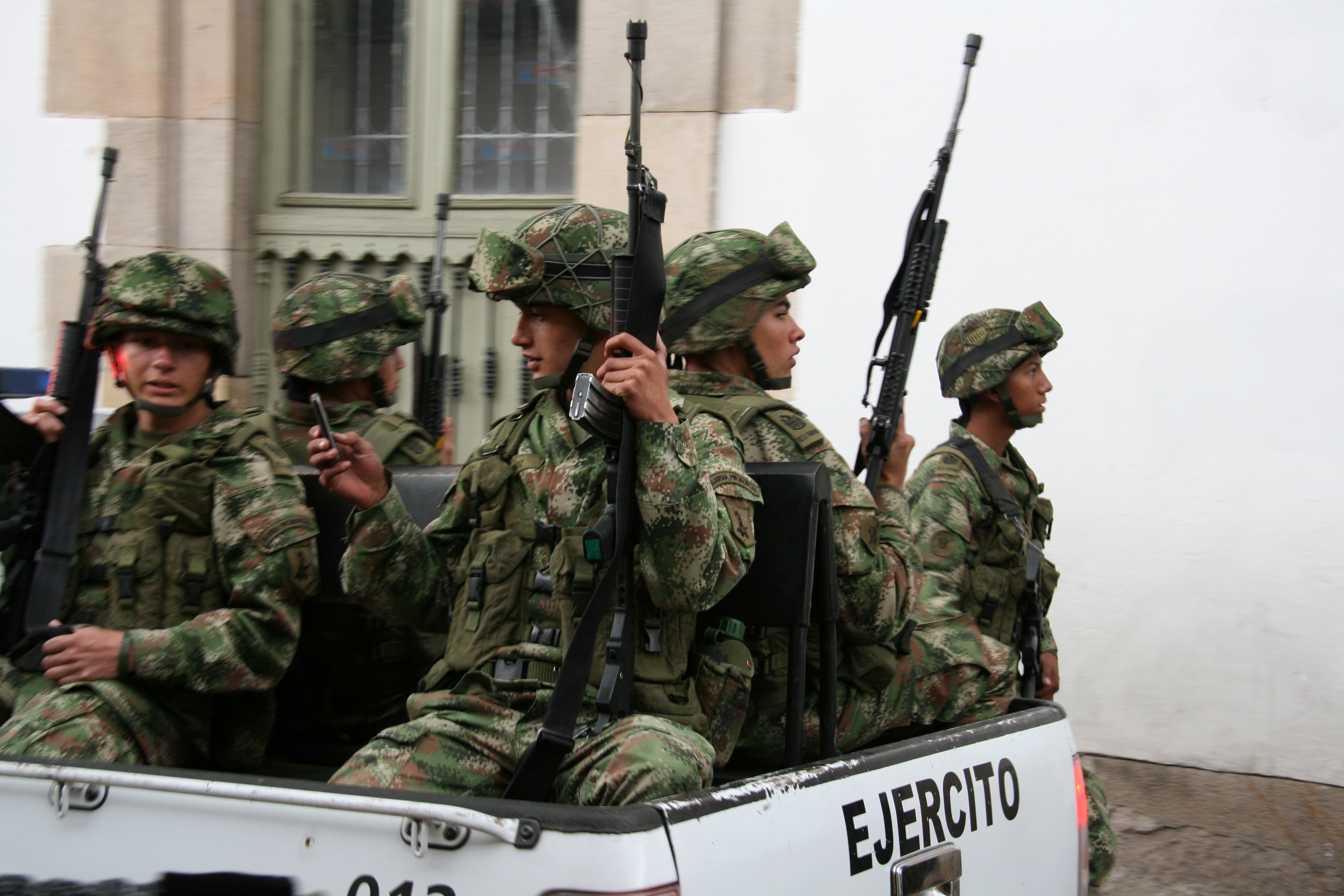
Guardsman in Zipaquira, 6 June 2013.

The Presidential Guard Battalion also known as 37th Infantry Presidential Guard Battalion is a unit of the Colombian Army and honor guard to the President of Colombia and the security detail for the President and his family in his official residence the Nariño Palace. The Battalion is made up of 9 companies, 4 of the companies represent the four traditional combat arms of the Colombian Army: Córdoba Company (Infantry), Rondon Troop (Cavalry), Ricaurte Battery (Artillery) and Caldas Company (Engineers).

The battalion had its origins in Simón Bolívar's Honor Guard, when he returned to Bogotá in 1814 he stayed in the San Carlos palace and was accompanied by his Honor Guard, which was distinguished from the other Units of the Bolívar's Patriot Army by the uniform that they wore, designed by Bolívar himself. On September 25 the commander of Bolívar's honor guard, Colonel Guillermo Fergusson an Irishman, sacrificed his life to save Simón Bolívar from an assassination attempt, in honor of his noble sacrifice the Presidential Guard Band and Corps of Drums which is its own company (the Fergusson Band) was named after him in his honor. The Battalion was re-established in 1927 by President Miguel Abadía Méndez, In 1948 during the infamous el Bogotazo a citywide street riot that almost destroyed all of the city center after infuriated supporters of liberal candidate for the presidency Jorge Eliecer Gaitán heard about his assassination that same day. The Presidential Guard was called up to protect the life of President Mariano Ospina Pérez and the lives of the members who were attending the 9th Pan-American Conference. When the infuriated crowds tried to take the Presidential Palace, the Battalion was able to defend it successfully, on that day Lieutenant Ruiz died on the steps of the palace entrance tying to defend it from the angry mobs.

The Battalion uses 2 dress uniforms, the honor guard wears a 19th-century uniform that was used by Simón Bolívar's Honor Guard, the color of this uniform is red and the uniform has 33 gold buttons, 11 buttons on each side. The 33 gold buttons represent the 33 battles that Bolívar fought in during his campaigns for South American Independence from Spain and, the 22 cords represent the 22 years that Bolívar had spent for fighting for independence. Worn with the uniform is a shako. The second uniform is based on 20th century Prussian military uniforms, it is black and the Pickelhaube helmet is worn, the Presidential Guard band and Corps of Drums also uses this uniform.

The Ricaurte Battery serves as the unit conducting 21-gun salutes during state visits and the Presidential inauguration.

==== Rapid Deployment Force ====
The Rapid Deployment Force (Spanish: Fuerza de Despliegue Rápido), also known as FUDRA, is the premier light infantry airborne division of the Colombian Army. Specializing in air assault operations, it carries the distinction of being the most logistically mobile infantry corps in the entire Colombian Armed Forces, and whose mission statement is to have the perpetual capability to respond to any crisis in any part of the country's national borders in rapid fashion.

Created on 7 December 1999 as part of a modernization effort of the armed forces during the Pastrana administration, its current function is to carry out pre-emptive offensive operations against insurgents and criminal groups.

It is considered an elite unit of the army, and was one of the key factors that led to FARC losing much of its territorial gains and logistical capabilities. Its greatest accomplishment was on the 23rd September 2010 – during Operation Sodoma – when the FARC's top military commander Jorge Briceño Suárez aka Mono Jojoy was successfully killed in action. At present, the Rapid Deployment Force is composed of 4 brigades; FUDRA No.1, FUDRA No.2, FUDRA No.3, and FUDRA No.4, with this latest one having been recently created.

==== GAULA groups ====
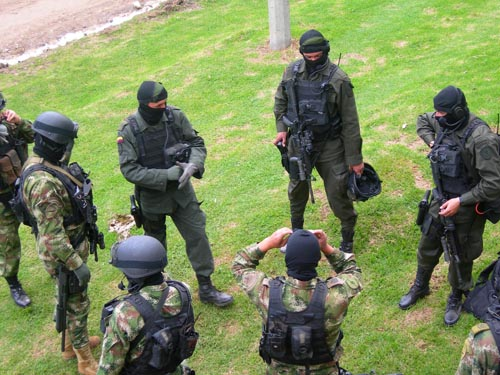
Members of the GAULA, prepare for a demonstration during a ceremony in Sibate, Colombia on Dec. 6, 2007.

GAULA is an acronym for Grupos de Acción Unificada por la Libertad Personal, i.e. Unified Action Groups for Personal Liberty, specialising in solving hostage-taking. These are elite units established in 1996 exclusively dedicated to the combating of kidnapping and extortion. They are composed of highly qualified personnel who conduct hostage rescues and dismantling of criminal gangs at the root of crimes which compromise the personal freedom of Colombians. There is an inter-institutional element in GAULA guaranteeing self-checking procedures, trained by staff of the Administrative Security Department, the Technical Investigation Corps (CTI) of the Criminal Investigation Bureau (Fiscalía) and military forces. Currently, the country has 16 GAULA of the Colombian National Army and 2 of the Navy.

==== Air Assault Aviation Division ====
The Colombian National Army Aviation or División de Aviación Asalto Aéreo del Ejército, is an aviation branch that works autonomously from the Colombian Aerospace Force. It is part of the Colombian Army and its main mission is to support the army's ground operations. This Unit was created on September 7, 2016, and it is managed by the Colombian Army. Over the years the Army Aviation has grown tremendously as it has become a fundamental part of the defense of the nation's borders and sovereignty. Within the Air Assault Division, a counter-guerilla warfare command has been established in 2021.

==== C-SAR ====
The Combat Search and Rescue Company or Compañía de Salvamento y Rescate en Combate (C-SAR) is a specialized unit within the Colombian National Army Aviation or División de Aviación Asalto Aéreo del Ejército that plans, directs and executes air combat search, rescue, evacuation, assistance and humanitarian support missions. C-SAR has eight groups distributed throughout the country, in the Mobility and Aviation Maneuver battalions, and two special combat rescue groups in the Tolemaida Fort, in addition, it is divided into four platoons: 'Alpha': jungle and mountain; ‘Bravo’: amphibian or water; 'Charlie': urban, and 'Asbre': support and service. Its emblem that is repeated among the rescue operations community is "Para que otros vivan" (So others may live).

==== Anti-Narcotics Brigade ====
- Anti-Narcotics Brigade (Brigada Anti-Narcoticos). This unit was specifically activated for operations against the trafficking of narcotics. It was created on December 8, 2000, and has its main headquarters in the Guaviare Department.

==== Special Forces Division ====
- (Commando Training Battalion) Batallón de Entrenamiento de Comandos
- (Special Forces Battalion No.1) Batallón de Fuerzas Especiales no.1 Juan Ruiz
- (Rural Special Forces Battalion No.2) Batallón de Fuerzas Especiales rurales no. 2 Francisco Vicente Almeida
- (Rural Special Forces Battalion No.3)Batallón de Fuerzas Especiales rurales no. 3 GR. Pedro Alcantara Herran y Zaldua
- (Rural Special Forces Battalion No.4) Batallón de Fuerzas Especiales rurales no. 4 CT. Jairo Ernesto Maldonado Melo
- (Special Forces Battalion No.5) Batallón de Fuerzas Especiales no. 5 MY. Francisco Garcia Molano
- (Urban Special Forces Group) Agrupación de Fuerzas Especiales Urbanas AFEUR
- (Urban Antiterrorist Special Forces Group: Alpha component) Agrupación de Fuerzas Especiales Antiterroristas Urbanas AFEAU componente Alpha

==== AFEAU unit ====
The Urban Counter-Terrorism Special Forces Group - Alpha, otherwise known as AFEAU (Spanish: Agrupación de Fuerzas Especiales Antiterroristas Urbanas) is an elite special operations unit within the Colombian Army, dedicated to performing high-value target acquisition or elimination, VIP protection, hostage rescue, quick reaction support, and counter assault operations within urban areas.

As the army component of the AFEAU special forces group, it answers directly to the General Command of the Armed Forces (Spanish: Comando General de las Fuerzas Armadas) and the Ministry of Defense. It is a special operations unit of the Colombian Army.

==== Military Police ====
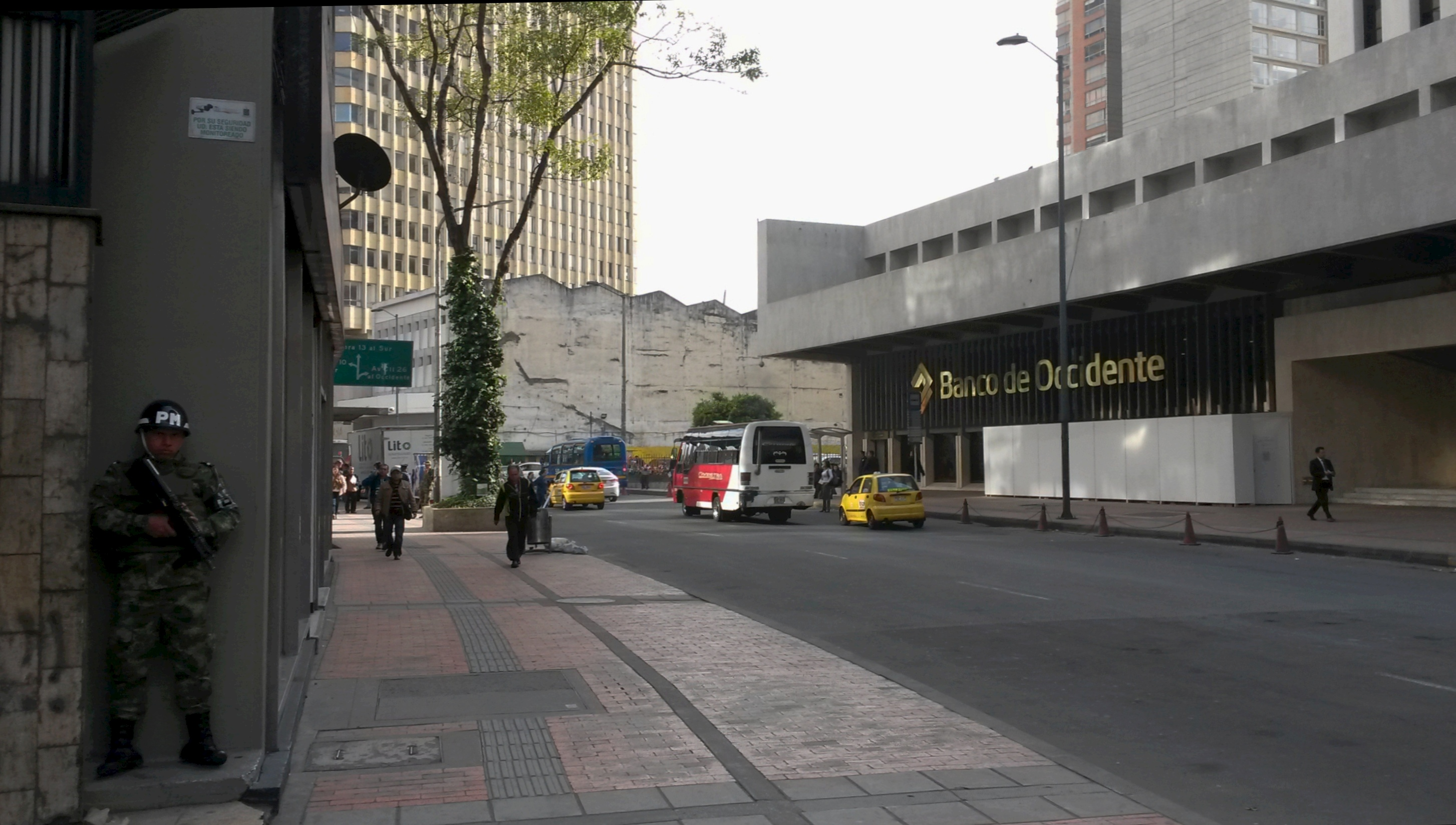
Military policeman standing guard near one of the entrances to the Centro Internacional Tequendama.

The Policía Militar (PM) are very common where they can be seen guarding closed roads, museums, embassies, government buildings, and airports. In the National Army of Colombia they are assigned to the 37 Military Police Battalions, wearing green uniforms with the military police helmet. These battalions also man the Army's different regional military bands and corps of drums.

== Schools and courses ==
=== Courses ===
- Arms and Services Capacitation and Specialization Courses
- Military Professorate
- Sports and Professional Achievements
- Combat Specialization Courses:
  - Lancero School
  - Counter-Guerrilla Course
  - Military Airborne School
  - Special Forces Course
  - Meritorious Conduct in Special Units Course
  - Intelligence School
  - Special Land Commandos Course
  - Urban Commando Course
  - Urban Counter-Guerrilla Course
  - Psychological Operations Course
  - Military Police Course

=== Military educational institutions ===
- Colombian Military Academy "General José María Córdova"
- Colombian Army NCO School "Sergeant Inocencio Chinca"
- Army School of Combined Arms (ESACE)
- Army Infantry School
- Army Cavalry School
- Army Artillery School
- Military Engineering School
- Army Communications School
- Army Logistics School
- Colombian Army Military Police School
- School of Civil-Military Relations
- Army Equestrian School
- Army Aviation School
- Army International Missions Support School
- Army Human Rights and International Rights School
- Army School of Languages

== Personnel ==
=== Rank and insignia ===
The ranks in the Military Forces of Colombia are regulated through the following applicable legislation: the Decree-Law 1790 of 2000, Law 1405 of 2010, and Law 1792 of 2016

The rank structure for closely parallels that of the United States military. There are nine officer ranks, ranging from the equivalent of second lieutenant to general. The army has nine enlisted grades, ranging from the equivalent of basic private to command sergeant major.

The tables below display the rank structures and rank insignias for the Colombian Army personnel. (Note: Colombia is not a member of NATO, so there is not an official equivalence between the Colombian military ranks and those defined by NATO. The displayed parallel is approximate and for illustration purposes only.)

==== Officers ====
Rank group	General / flag officers					Senior officers			Junior officers
Colombian National Army
Colombian National Army		General de ejército		Mayor general	Brigadier general	Coronel	Teniente coronel	Mayor	Capitán	Teniente	Subteniente
Abbr.	-	GR	-	MG	BG	CR	TC	MY	CT	TE	ST

==== Enlisted ====
Rank group	Senior NCOs							Junior NCOs		Enlisted
Colombian National Army												No insignia
Colombian National Army	Sargento mayor de comando conjunto	Sargento mayor de ejército	Sargento mayor de comando	Sargento mayor	Sargento primero	Sargento viceprimero	Sargento segundo	Cabo primero	Cabo segundo	Cabo tercero	Soldado profesional	Soldado
Abbr.	SMCC	SME	SMC	SM	SP	SV	SS	CP	CS	C3
English title	Joint Command Sergeant Major	Army Sergeant Major	Command Sergeant Major	Sergeant Major	First Sergeant	Sergeant First Class	Second Sergeant	First Corporal	Second Corporal	Third Corporal

=== Dragoons and soldiers ===
		SOLDIERS		
NATO Groups	OR-2	OR-1		
Colombia	(DGP) - DRAGONEANTE PROFESIONAL - Professional Dragoon	Dragoons (Regular Soldiers SL18 y Bachelors SL12)	Professional soldier with 6 years	
Grade	Dragoneante profesional	Dragoneante	Soldado profesional	Soldado
Abrev.	DGP	DG	SLP	SL18 / SL12

Dragoneante Profesional: (DGP) Professional Dragoon is the highest rank in the hierarchy of the professional soldier, after completing the leadership and command course in operations, it is the support of the command staff, whether officers or non-commissioned officers, it will be employed or assigned as a command replacement executor or Squad commander. The number in their rank insignia indicating the number of years they have served.

Soldado Profesional: (SLP) Professional Soldier is one who, after completing mandatory military service, decides to continue in the force by completing a process of military studies at the (ESPRO) School of Professional Soldiers, which upon completion decides to make this his profession. He receives a salary, seniority bonus, family allowance, and retires after 20 years of service. The number in their rank insignia indicating the number of years they have served.

Dragoneante regular: (DG) Regular Dragoons are Detached soldiers who, after following special training, obtains command over other soldiers of the same or lower seniority. These Dragooners are generally used as auxiliary support in I/R training and replacement companies.

Soldado: (SL18) Soldier is a Conscript soldier who performs mandatory military service according to the law. They provide service for 18 months and in the case of high school graduates (SL12) for 12 months

== Uniforms ==
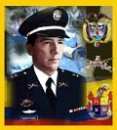
Historic uniform on LT Gómez Paris

Colombian army personnel wear a number of different uniforms for both cold and hot weather as follows:

Army officer uniforms included a full-dress uniform of blue coat and white trousers for a cold climate; a white full-dress uniform for a hot climate; several different dress uniforms for both hot and cold climates that consisted of some combination of blue and white coat and trousers with piping or fringe on the trousers to indicate branch of service; an olive-drab barracks uniform for a cold climate; a tan gabardine barracks uniform for a hot climate; and tan gabardine service and field uniforms for all climates.

Army enlisted uniforms consisted of an olive-drab dress uniform for a cold climate, a tan flannel dress uniform for a hot climate, and tan barracks and field uniforms for all climates.

=== Camouflage uniforms ===
Since 2006 the National Army of Colombia changed its uniform type from forest (woodland) to a modernized design, featuring a new digital camouflage pattern (pixel).

There are 2 types of camouflage, jungle camouflage that is used by most of the army and the desert camouflage that is used by troops in the department of La Guajira and the Colombia Battalion in the Sinai peninsula in the Multinational Force and Observers.

The changes provide greater comfort to the troops, while the material used allows even for the application of mosquito repellent to prevent mosquito bites and a high percentage of the concentration of bacteria and odors.

The design of camouflage texture, color and design is unique to the Colombian army. It is locally made and its distribution is controlled so that only Colombia's military forces can use it.

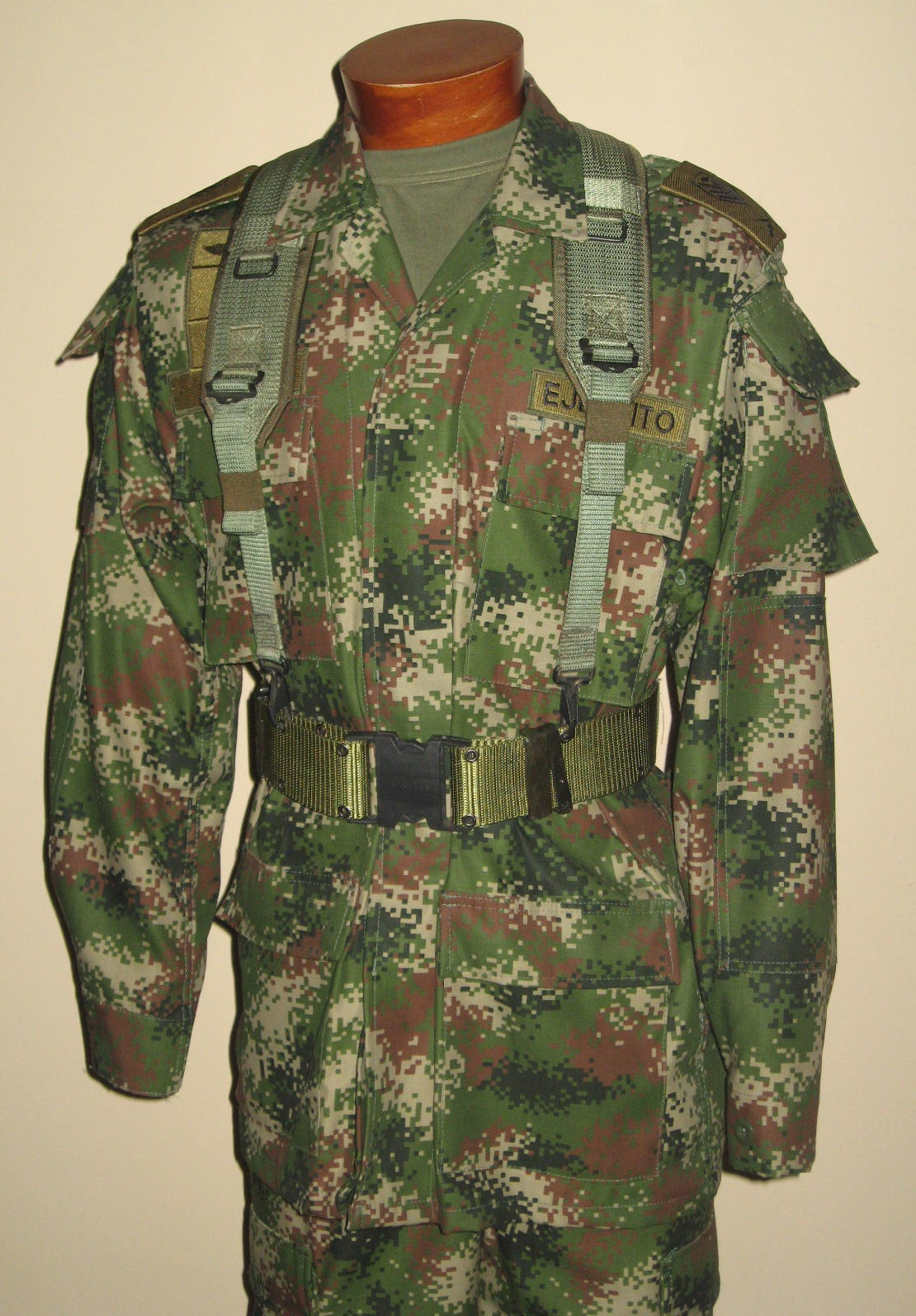
Image of modern camouflage currently worn by the Colombian army.

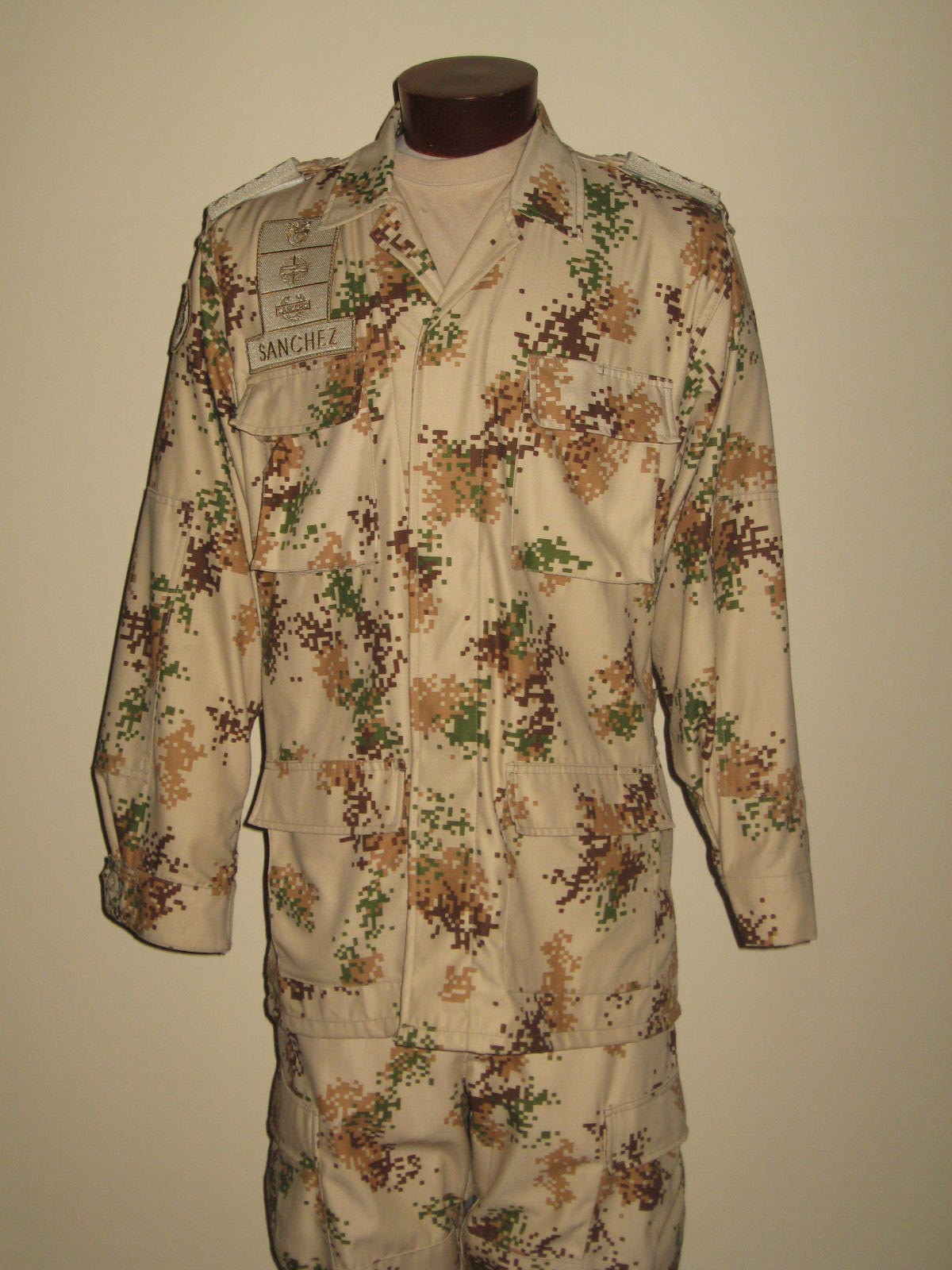
Camouflage for desert operations.

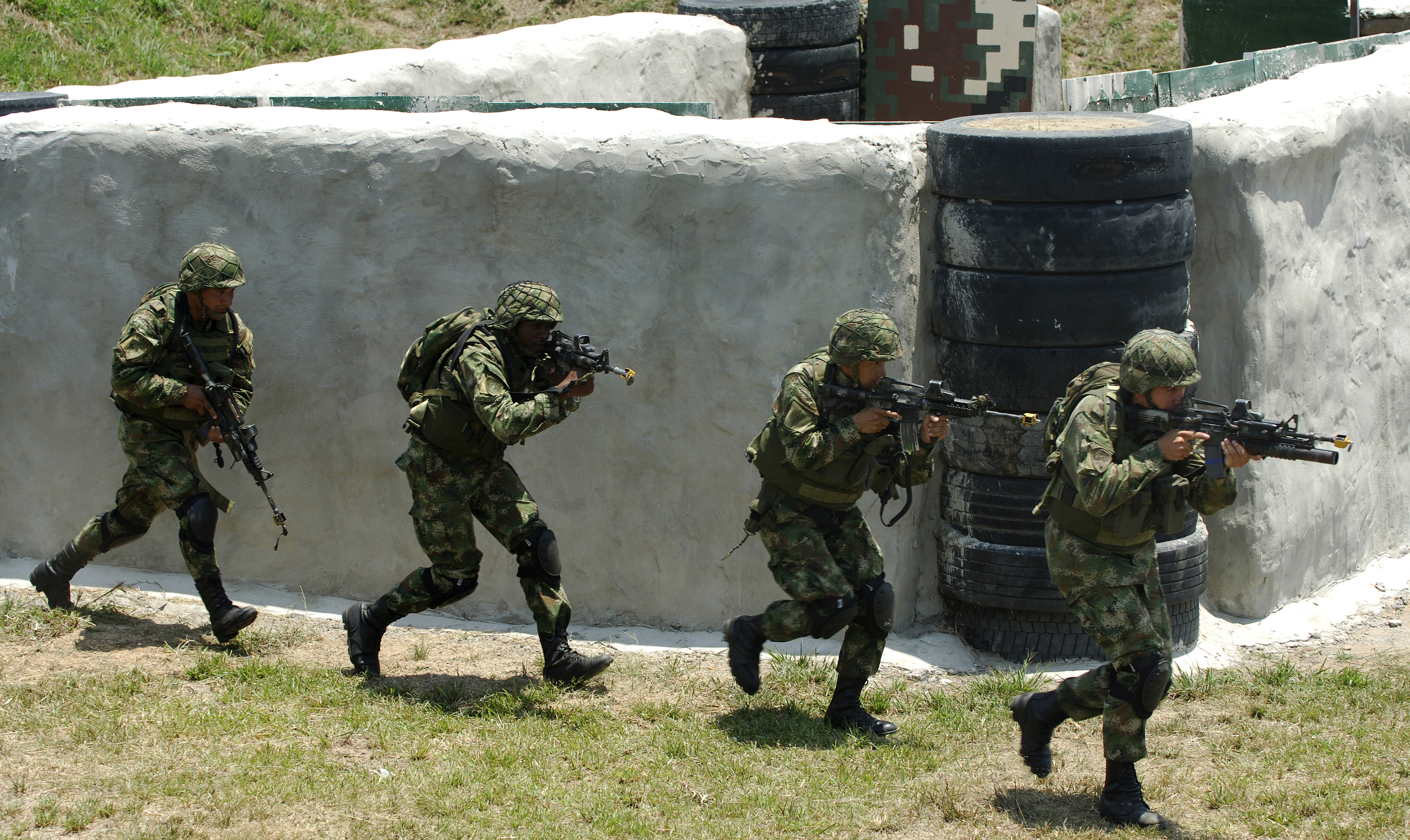
Special Forces wearing the new field uniform

== Equipment ==
The National Army of Colombia main standard-issue assault rifle had been the IMI Galil since 1994 which replaced the old G3 assault rifle of the National Army of Colombia and produced under license by INDUMIL and other rifles are the M16A2, Galil ACE, M4A1/M4 carbines, and the TAR-21 for their army, the main grenade in the National Army of Colombia is the M26 fragmentation hand grenade, the standard sidearms are the Cordova pistol, M1911 pistol, the Beretta M9 and the IWI Jericho 941.The standard-issue light machine gun is the IMI Negev and the General purpose variant, the Negev NG7 which uses a 7.62×51mm NATO other than the 5.56×45mm NATO of the light IMI Negev. Other machine guns include the Daewoo Precision Industries K3 adopted in 2006, M249 light machine guns, M2 Browning, the M60, FN MAG and the M1919 Browning machine gun. Submachine guns include the Uzi and the Heckler & Koch MP5.

== See also ==
- Military of Colombia
- Lancero
- Ranger
- Military ranks of the Colombian Armed Forces
- Colombian military decorations
