= Colombian National Army Aviation =

Aviation combat arms unit

The Colombian National Army Aviation is an aviation combat arms unit in the National Army of Colombia. Its history dates back to December 31, 1919, but was not fully developed until August 25, 1995, when this unit is officially activated under the name "Aviación Ejército" (Army Aviation). The Army Aviation was created to support ground operations from the air.

== History ==
Military aviation began in Colombia in 1919 with the creation of a military aviation school for the Colombian Army. Previously by Law 15 of 1916 of September 7 to commissions were sent overseas to study new technological advancements in aviation, infantry, cavalry, engineering and trains. Officers pertaining to the Colombian Army were also sent to take a course on flight training on techniques and tactics. The school is then created in Colombia along with the Colombian National Army Aviation as a fifth regiment by Law 126 of 1919 of December 31 authorized by President of Colombia, Marco Fidel Suárez. The unit was officially activated on February 15, 1921, in Flandes, Department of Tolima with the support of French mission led by Lieutenant Colonel Rene Guichard. The Aviation School initially had 3 Caudron G.3 E-2, 3 Caudron G.4 A-2 and four Nieuport Delage 11 C-1. The school was closed due to financial hardships on 1922.

== Order of Battle ==
25th Army Aviation Brigade

- Army Aviation Operational Command (AAF Fuerte Tolemaida)

Army Aviation Airfield "TG. General Gustavo Rojas Pinilla"

- 2nd Air Assault Aviation Battalion operating UH-60L
- 3rd Equipment and Troop Transport Aviation Battalion operating Ми-17-1В/МД/B5
- 4th Reconnaissance and Escort Aviation Battalion operating UH-1N
- 5th Aerial Movement Aviation Battalion operating UH-1H-II
- Special Operations Aviation Battalion
- Aviation Training Battalion
- Aviation Maintenance Battalion
- 25th Aviation Support and Service Battalion

Army Aviation Base Bogotà, El Dorado I.A.P.

- 1st Aircraft Aviation Battalion operating AN-32A, C212-100, Ce208B, RC695/A and various Beech aircraft types
- Army Aviation School
- Aviation Logistics and Service Battalion

Army Aviation

- Detachment of 2nd AAABn operating UH-60L
- Detachment of 4th REABn operating UH-1N
- Detachment of 5th AMABn operating UH-1H-II
- 6th Mobility and Manoeuvre Battalion operating helicopters detached from the parent units

Army Aviation Base San José del Guaviare

- Detachment of 2nd AAABn operating UH-60L
- Detachment of 4th REABn operating UH-1N
- Detachment of 5th AMABn operating UH-1H-II
- 4th Mobility and Manoeuvre Battalion operating helicopters detached from the parent units

Army Aviation Base Tumaco

- Detachment of 2nd AAABn operating UH-60L
- Detachment of 4th REABn operating UH-1N
- Detachment of 5th AMABn operating UH-1H-II

Batallón de Movilidad y Maniobra No. 1 Forward Operating Base Buena Vista

- 1st Mobility and Manoeuvre Battalion operating helicopters detached from the parent units

Forward Operating Base Saravena

- 5th Mobility and Manoeuvre Battalion operating helicopters detached from the parent units

== Aircraft inventory ==
While reliant on the Colombian Aerospace Force for heavier air support, the Army maintains a fleet of 163 aircraft, including 141 helicopters.

Fixed Wing	Origin	Type	Version(s)	In service	Notes
Gulfstream Turbo Commander	United States	Transport	Commander 1000	2	
Beechcraft King Air	United States	Transport	90; 200; 350	4	
Beechcraft Super King Air	United States	Electronic warfare	200; 350	4	
Cessna 208 Caravan	United States	Utility		5	
Aero Commander 500	United States	Utility	Rockwell 685 Commander	2	
Antonov An-32	Ukraine	Transport		2	

Helicopters	Origin	Type	Version(s)	In service	Notes
UH-1 Iroquois; UH-1N Twin Huey	United States	Utility helicopter	UH-1H; UH-1N	64	
Mil Mi-17	Russia	Transport helicopter		20	One lost on 25 February 2013 and in 2024
Sikorsky UH-60 Black Hawk	United States	Transport/ Combat helicopter	UH-60L; S-70i	53; 7	Including the 15 from Plan Colombia. All S-70i helicopters used by the Special Operations Aviation Battalion. 1 UH-60 lost in February 2024.

== See also ==
- Army aviation
