= Patricia Linares =

Colombian jurist

Patricia Linares is a Colombian lawyer and judge. She served as the Founding President of the Special Jurisdiction for Peace (SJP) from November 4, 2017 until November 4, 2020. In 2020, she was voted Colombia Reports' personality of the year for her "ability to fence off attacks and deescalate tensions" at the SJP.
