= Manuel José Bonnet =

- Born: June 25, 1936; Ciénaga
- Died: June 15, 2018 (aged 81); Hospital Militar de Bogotá
- Military career
- Allegiance: Colombian
- Branch: National Army of Colombia
- Commands: National Army of Colombia
- Other work: Professor of political science at Del Rosario University, Ambassador of Colombia in Greece and philosopher

Manuel José Bonnet Locarno (25 June 1936 – 15 June 2018) was a Colombian military officer, Commander of the National Army of Colombia between December 1996 and July 1997, under the presidency of Ernesto Samper. Born in Ciénaga (Magdalena department), Bonnet also was Commandant during Toma de Miraflores. He was a distinguished intellectual, professor of political science at Del Rosario University, Ambassador of Colombia in Greece and philosopher.

In 2010, he was appointed acting governor of Magdalena by President Juan Manuel Santos in replacement of Governor-elect Omar Díazgranados, who was dismissed for irregularities in hiring, until 2012. He testified at the Inter-American Court of Human Rights about the Mapiripán Massacre.

General Manuel José Bonnet died of cancer on the morning of Friday, June 15, 2018 at the Hospital Militar de Bogotá. The funeral took place the following day.
