= Lancero =

Colombian Army special forces course

Lancero School
- Escuela Militar de Lanceros
- The Lancero insignia, worn on completion of the course
- Active: 1955–present
- Country: Colombia
- Branch: Colombian National Army
- Type: Military training school
- Role: Small-unit leadership and irregular-warfare training
- Garrison/HQ: Tolemaida, Tolima

Commanders
- Notable commanders: Hernando Bernal Duran

Lancero (English: Lancer) is a military course and qualification of the Colombian National Army, run at the School of Lanceros (Escuela Militar de Lanceros) in Tolemaida, Tolima, Colombia. Established in 1955 with help from US Army Rangers, it trains small-unit leaders for irregular and counterinsurgency warfare; the United States and other foreign militaries also send personnel to the course.

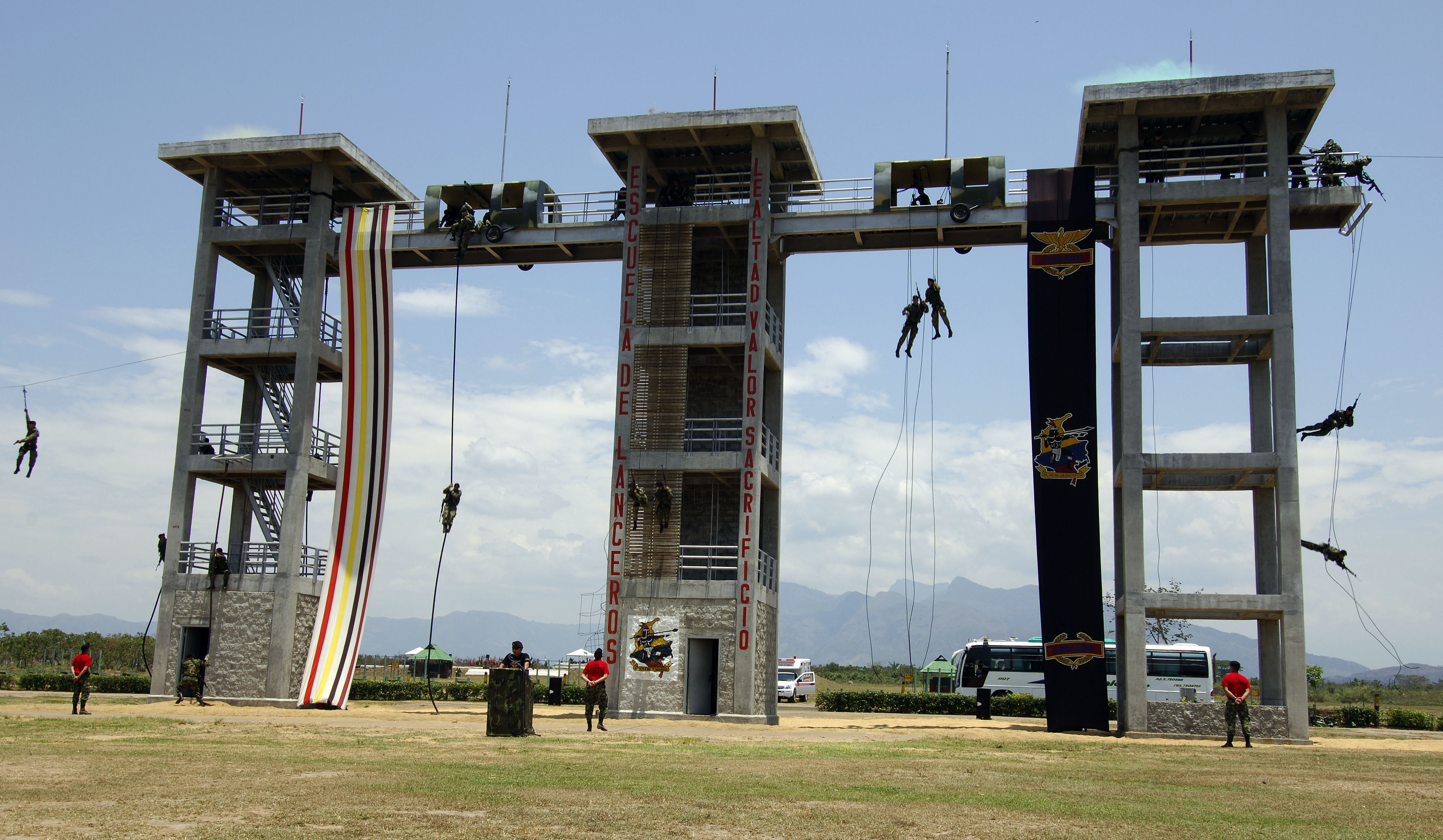
The jump tower at the Tolemaida base

The Colombian Army has been in conflict with rebel guerrillas since the 1960s, which led the government and its armed forces to develop courses aimed specifically at training soldiers and officers for that kind of warfare. The name Lancero honors a unit of lancers that fought for Simón Bolívar in the war of independence and showed particular bravery at the Battle of Vargas Swamp.

== History ==
The Lancero School (Escuela Militar de Lanceros) was established in 1955, when two US Army Ranger officers, among them Captain Ralph Puckett, developed a Ranger-style training program for the Colombian Army. The course was based on the Fort Benning Ranger Course and adapted to Colombian conditions; its techniques were taught to officers and NCOs of the army and to some personnel of the Naval Infantry before spreading across the armed forces. The army's focus on this kind of training grew through the early 1960s as it confronted irregular conflict with armed peasants in the mountains.

In 1959, Captain Hernando Bernal Duran raised the first Lancer companies of the National Army, modeled on the US Army Rangers and the Korean War Ranger Companies and drawing on lessons from Colombia's earlier deployment to the Korean War. The new companies were more agile and flexible, and were attached to units facing the most active opposition; in 1959 the school created the Compañías de Lanceros (Lancero Companies) as a more agile and flexible formation within the army.

In 1966 the school was tasked with running an Extraordinary NCO Course (Curso Extraordinario de Suboficiales), and in 1969 it introduced a dedicated counter-guerrilla course (Curso de Contraguerrilla) under its commander, Major Carlos Narváez Casallas.

Since then the course has trained soldiers, army officers and police officers for asymmetric warfare against an enemy that hides among the civilian population. It has become known among military personnel internationally for its focus on guerrilla rather than conventional warfare.

== Foreign participation ==
International personnel also attend the course. United States special forces soldiers, including members of the 7th Special Forces Group, have earned the Lancero qualification, and the course has drawn personnel from several other Latin American armies. In November 2023, paratroopers of the US 173rd Airborne Brigade graduated from the school, described as a historic first. The Lancero badge is one of a number of foreign badges authorized for wear on the Canadian Armed Forces uniform.

== Lancero and Lanza ==
A founding principle of the course is that each aspirant chooses a partner, a Compañero de Lanza ('lance companion'), and the two are trained to work in close cooperation.

== See also ==
- United States Army Rangers
- Lance
- Fire and maneuver
