= 3rd Division (Colombia) =

Colombian National Army division

The 3rd Division (Spanish: Tercera División del Ejército Nacional de Colombia) is a Colombian National Army division based in the city of Cali consisting of four brigades: the 3rd Brigade based in Cali, the 8th Brigade based in Armenia, the 23rd Brigade based in Pasto and the 29th Brigade based in Popayán. The division is also supported by the 3rd Explosive Ordnance Disposal Group based in Cali.

As of December 2023 the commander is general Giovani Rodríguez. The Division has fought against the Revolutionary Armed Forces of Colombia remnant groups and suffered an injured soldier in fighting in Buenos Aires, Cauca in February 2024.

== Units ==
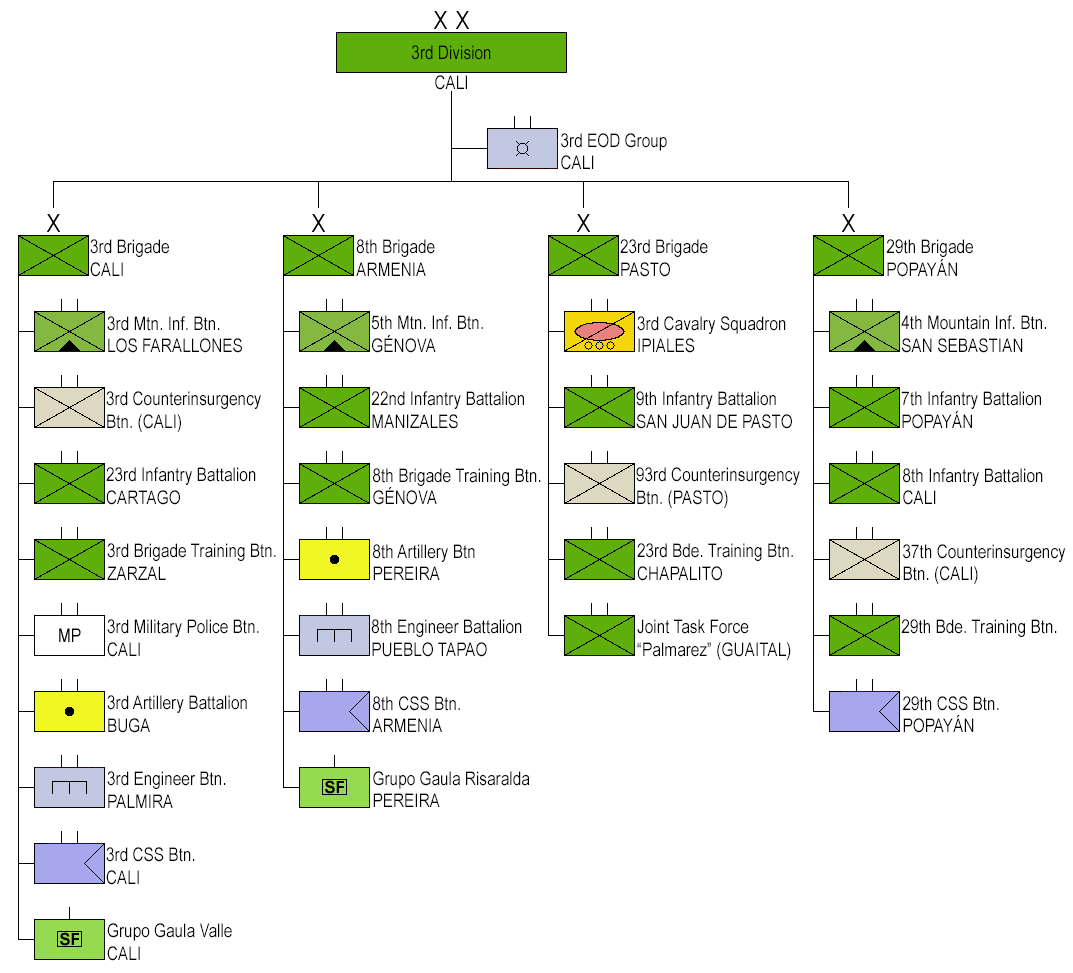
Structure of the 3rd Division of the Colombian National Army.

=== 3rd Brigade ===
- 3rd Brigade HQ (Cali)
  - 3rd Mountain Infantry Battalion (Los Farallones)
  - 3rd Counterinsurgency Battalion (Cali)
  - 23rd Infantry Battalion (Cartago)
  - 3rd Brigade Training Battalion (Zarzal)
  - 3rd Military Police Battalion (Cali)
  - 3rd Artillery Battalion (Buga)
  - 3rd Engineer Battalion (Palmira)
  - 3rd Combat Service Support Battalion (Cali)
  - Gaula Group “Valle” (Cali)

=== 8th Brigade ===
- 8th Brigade HQ (Armenia)
  - 5th Mountain Infantry Battalion (Génova)
  - 22nd Infantry Battalion (Manizales)
  - 8th Brigade Training Battalion (Génova)
  - 8th Artillery Battalion (Pereira)
  - 8th Engineer Battalion (Pueblo Tapao)
  - 8th Combat Service Support Battalion (Armenia)
  - Gaula Group “Risaralda” (Pereira)

=== 23rd Brigade ===
- 29th Brigade HQ (Pasto)
  - 3rd Cavalry Group (Ipiales)
  - 9th Infantry Battalion (San Juan De Pasto)
  - 93rd Counterinsurgency Battalion (Pasto)
  - 23rd Brigade Training Battalion (Chapalito)
  - Joint Task Force “Palmares” (Guaital)

=== 29th Brigade ===
- 29th Brigade HQ (Popayán)
  - 4th Mountain Infantry Battalion (San Sebastián)
  - 7th Infantry Battalion (Popayán)
  - 8th Infantry Battalion (Cali)
  - 37th Counterinsurgency Battalion (Cali)
  - 29th Brigade Training Battalion
  - 29th Combat Service Support Battalion (Popayán)

=== Divisional Support ===
- 3rd Explosive Ordnance Disposal Group (Cali)
