= Coney Hall =

Area of Greater London, England

Coordinates: 51.3699°N 0.0016°E

- Location within Greater London
- OS grid reference: TQ394653
- London borough: Bromley
- Ceremonial county: Greater London
- Region: London
- Country: England
- Sovereign state: United Kingdom
- Post town: WEST WICKHAM
- Postcode district: BR4
- Dialling code: 020
- Police: Metropolitan
- Fire: London
- Ambulance: London
- UK Parliament: Beckenham and Penge
- London Assembly: Bexley and Bromley

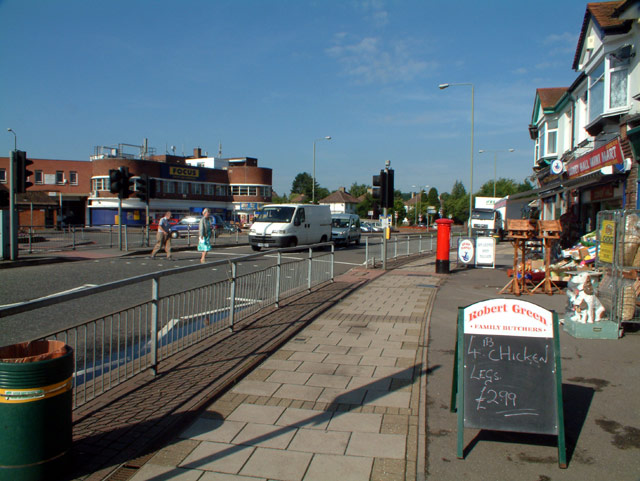
The main shopping district on Glebe Way.

Coney Hall is an area of Greater London, within the London Borough of Bromley, Greater London and formerly in the historic county of Kent. It is located south of Hayes, west of Keston, north of Nash, and east of West Wickham of which it is usually considered a part. The Prime Meridian passes through Coney Hall.

== History ==
Coney Hall Farm was first mentioned in the 17th century, when its lease stated that the tenant had the sole right to catch coneys (rabbits) on nearby Jackson’s Heath.

Coney Hall is one of many owner-occupied estates arising during the inter-War housing boom; it was built in the 1930s on hilly farmland south-east of West Wickham by the developers Morrell Brothers, who purchased Coney Hall Farm following the death of its owner Sir Henry Lennard in 1928. In the previous decade, Lennard's opposition to road developments adjacent to West Wickham Common and Hayes Common had left the area accessible only by steep and narrow lanes. In Coney Hall's early days London Transport refused to provide a bus service, and a free private coach service connected the estate to the nearest railway station, Hayes. The quality of the new houses was not always that high, with a mortgage strike by Elsy Borders of 81 Kingsway in 1937 sparking sympathy strikes elsewhere, and contributing ultimately to an improvement in the legal standing of mortgage payers. During World War II Canadian troops were billeted at Coney Hall.

The area contains typical suburban architecture of two-storey houses with polygonal bay windows and half-timbered gables. It is centred on a bend on Glebe Road, east of Coney Hall roundabout, with a smaller row of shops on Addington Road.

== Transport ==
=== Rail ===
The nearest National Rail station is Hayes station.

=== Buses ===
- 119 to Bromley or to Purley Way via West Wickham & Croydon. 24 Hour service. Operated by Go Ahead London for TfL.
- 138 to Bromley. Operated by Go Ahead London for TfL.
- 246 to Bromley or to Westerham via Biggin Hill. Operated by Go Ahead London for TfL.
- 314 to Eltham via Bromley or to New Addington. Operated by Stagecoach London for TfL.
- 353 to Ramsden Estate via Orpington or to Forestdale. Operated by Go Ahead London for TfL.

== Public spaces and sport ==
- The Assembly Halls (Community centre)
- Coney Hall Recreation Ground (tennis courts, table tennis courts, traffic park, multi-use games area, playground, skatepark and green space)
- Well Wood (woods and green space). 41.61 acres (16.84 ha) The Well Wood consists of ancient semi-natural woodland with oak, ash, hazel, yew, sweet chestnut, field maple, hawthorn, Douglas fir and larch, containing masses of wood anemones and wood sorrel, followed by a carpet of bluebells; it is frequented by bats, badgers, foxes, owls, woodpeckers, buzzards and many other birds.

The local football club - Coney Hall FC - formed in 1973 and reached the Combined Counties League, winning the Division One championship in 2004/05. The club folded in 2016, but a new Coney Hall FC was subsequently formed to play youth football.

Layhams Road runs south from Coney Hall towards the North Downs, and is a popular cycling route.

== Gallery ==
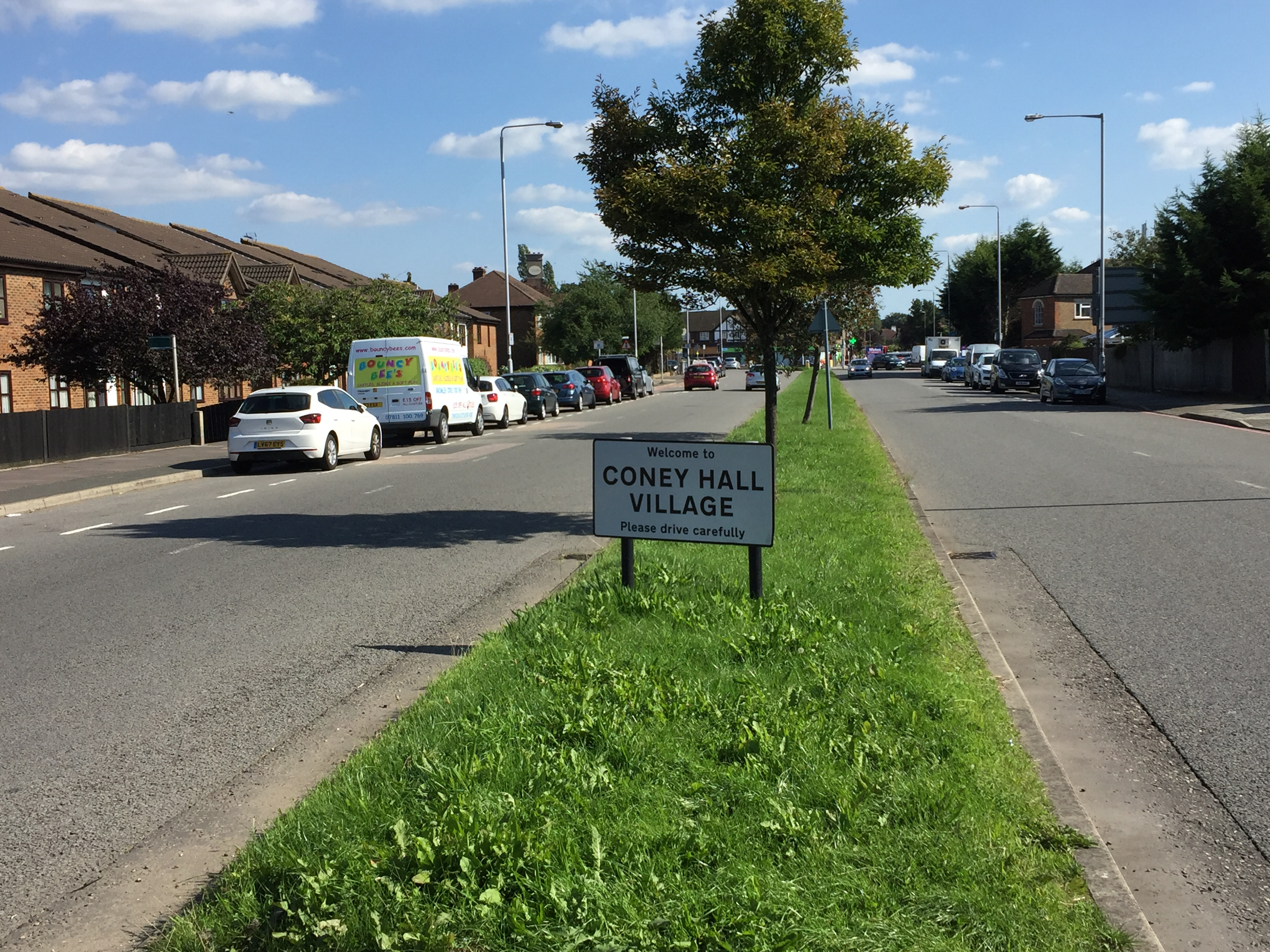
Welcome sign on Glebe Way

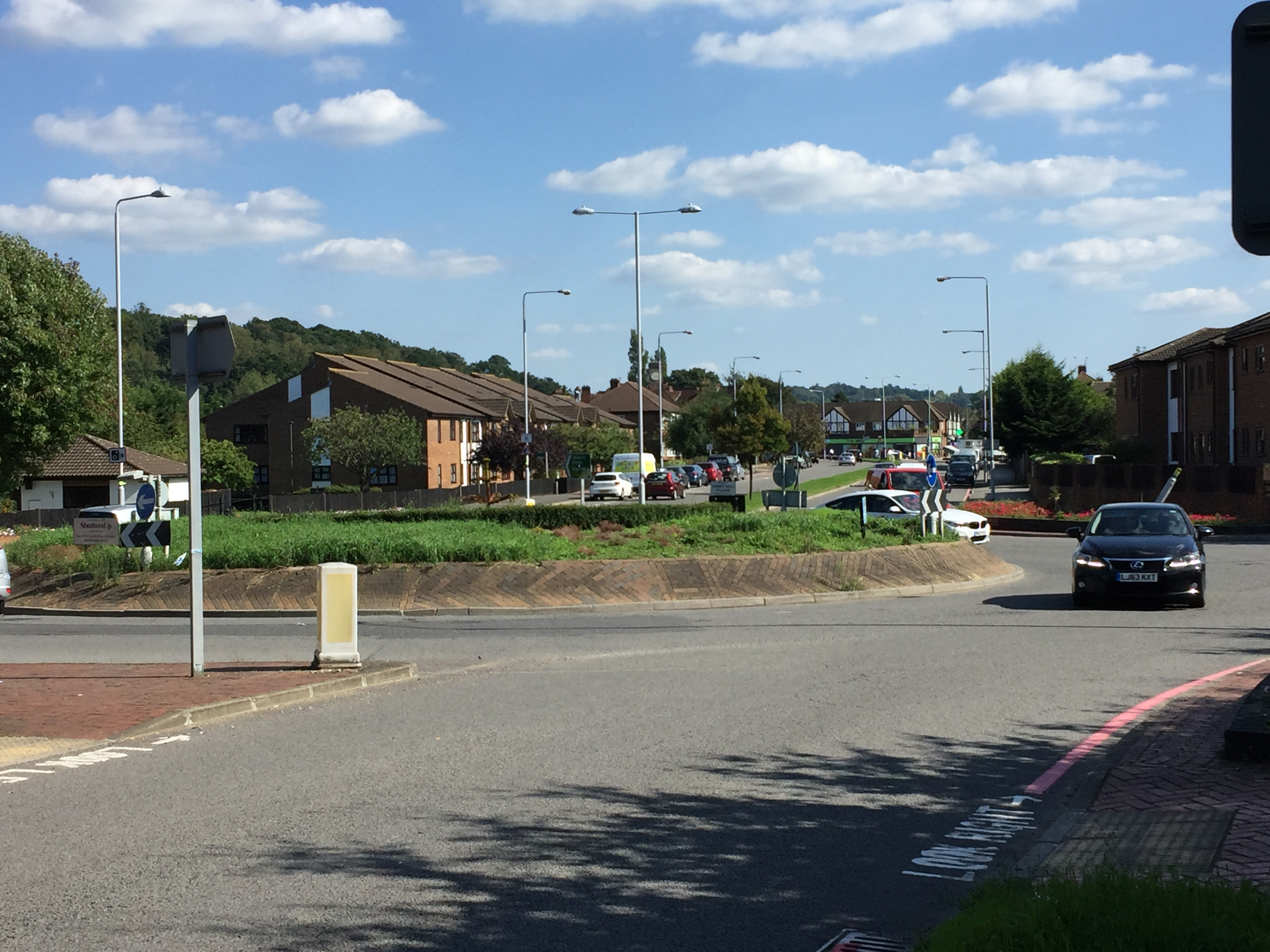
Coney Hall roundabout

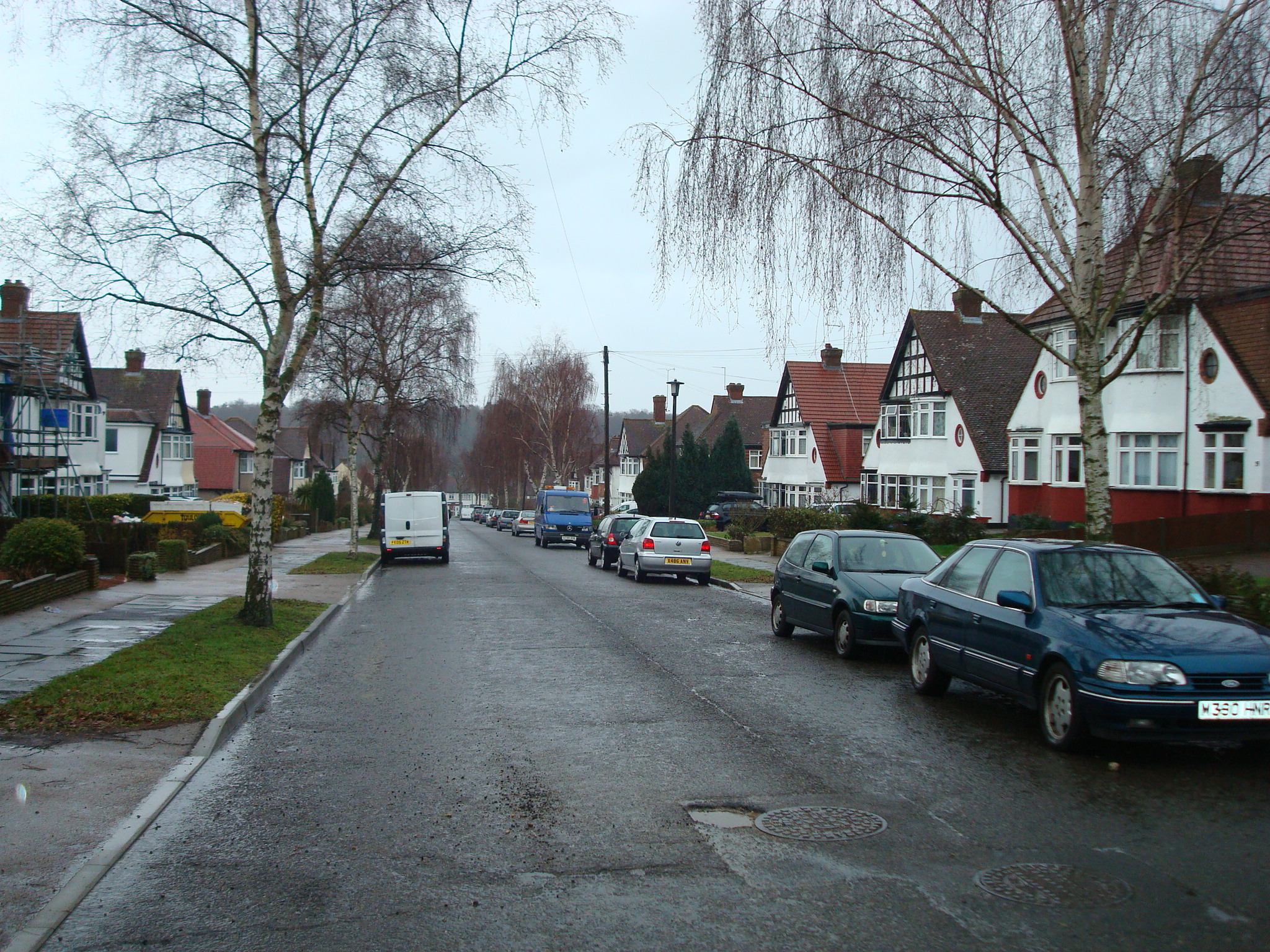
Typical housing in Coney Hall

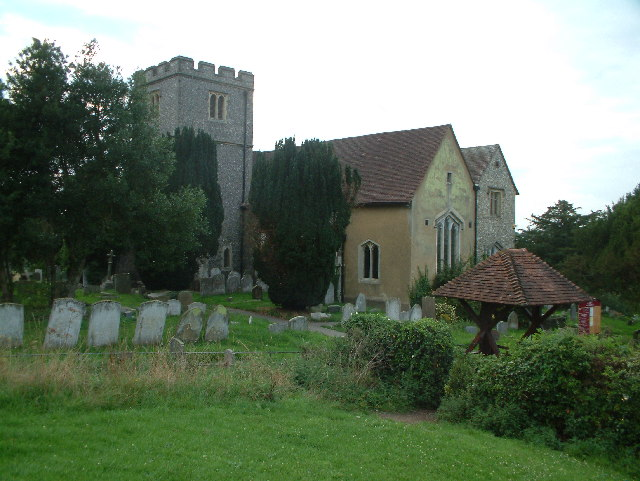
St John's Church
