= Elsy Borders =

British campaigner for building standards

- Elsy Borders, from a 1939 British Pathé newsreel film.
- Born: Elsy Florence Eva Kreher; 14 January 1905; Lambeth
- Died: 14 August 1971 (aged 66); Exeter
- Occupation: Activist for housing reform

Elsy Florence Eva Borders, née Kreher, (14 January 1905 – 14 August 1971) was a campaigner for building standards who led a large mortgage strike in England in the 1930s.

== Early life ==
Elsy Kreher was born in 1905, in Lambeth, the daughter of John Engelbert Kreher and Edith Eliza Morley Kreher. Her father was a waiter.

== Career ==
In 1937, Elsy Borders and her husband withheld payments and sued the building society that held the mortgage on their newly built semi-detached house on the Coney Hall estate near West Wickham in Kent, for misrepresenting the house's "slap-dash" workmanship. She studied law at the London School of Economics, in order to represent herself in court in 1938. "Not the least occasion for the notoriety of the Borders case," commented an American observer, "was the fact that Elsie Borders herself must be a picturesque character, the wife of a taxi-cab operator, who acted as her own counsel in the case and apparently her own press agent. She proved to be a good one in both cases." "'Portia' Borders became the heroine of thousands of Britons who pay high rents for grimy kennels or find their shiny new houses falling apart," explained Time magazine in 1939. She appealed the case up to the House of Lords, but it was finally lost in 1941.

In a related case, Borders successfully represented her husband in a libel case brought by the housing society.

Elsy Borders was a member of the Communist party, and helped to form the Federation of Tenants’ and Residents’ Association (FTRA). They led a mortgage strike in England, joined by 3,000 home-owners. The FTRA held its first national convention in 1939, in Birmingham. That year, an amendment to the Building Societies Act, introduced by Ellen Wilkinson, addressed some of the FTRA's concerns; however, the Act's final revision increased protections for the building societies.

In July 2024 a play written by Stephen Wyatt about Borders story was broadcast on BBC Radio 4. Anne-Marie Duff portrayed Elsy Borders.

== Personal life ==
Elsy Kreher married James Walter (Jim) Borders in 1926; her husband was a London cabby. They had a daughter, Pamela, born in 1930. The couple jokingly called their house "Insanity", and themselves "the Borders of Insanity." The Borders moved away from London in 1940, and divorced in 1944. Elsy and her daughter moved to Exeter during World War II. Elsy Borders died in 1971, aged 66 years, in Exeter.
