= Elsy del Pilar Cuello =

Judge of Supreme Court of Colombia

Elsy del Pilar Cuello Calderón (born in Bogotá, 13 June 1959) is a former Supreme Court Judge of the Corte Suprema de Justicia of Colombia.

Elsy del Pilar Cuello Calderón is a lawyer graduated from the Universidad Santo Tomás in Bogotá, Colombia. Since 1990 she has been a Court Judge. She was part of the Labor Cassation Chamber of the Supreme Court of Colombia. Mrs. Cuello is also part of the National Commission of Gender for the judicial Branch (Comisión Nacional de Género de la Rama Judicial), which was created in February 2008. This commission determines the rules for gender equity in the judicial branch of Colombia.

Elsy del Pilar Cuello has been elected twice as Supreme Court Judge of Colombia. The first time was in June 2004 for a three-month period and later on June 5, 2007, for the regular term of eight years.
