= Colombia Reports =

Colombian online newspaper in English

- Website type: News
- Available in: English
- Founded: 2008; 18 years ago
- Headquarters: Medellín, Colombia
- Founder: Adriaan Alsema
- Key people: Adriaan Alsema, Editor-in-Chief; Jenifer Rivera, coordinator
- Employees: <10
- Website: colombiareports.com
- Advertising: Yes
- Registration: Optional
- Launched: 2008; 18 years ago
- Current status: Active

Colombia Reports is a Colombian online newspaper in English, founded in 2008 by Dutch journalist Adriaan Alsema and headquartered in Medellín. The organization claims to be independent and not affiliated with any political or social organization.

== History ==
The site started "as a weblog just to bring Colombian news in English in a way it wasn’t being brought." Alsema stated in a 2009 interview that "even though Colombia is one of the most important countries for U.S. foreign policy in Latin America, the information available to those that don’t speak Spanish was very limited."

On February 26, 2014, Colombia Reports received angel funding from GITP Ventures in order to more aggressively expand the company's offerings in the marketplace. GITP Ventures and Colombia Reports parted ways on February 9, 2016, with Alsema stating in an editorial "that running a news website almost automatically creates conflicts with the economic interests of investors".

In April 2015, Colombia Reports' editor-in-chief Adriaan Alsema published a series of articles claiming that between 2003 and 2007, US military personnel and contractors had sexually abused many Colombian children. By June 2015, it was discovered that the source for these articles was faulty and Alsema was forced to retract those stories, expressing regret that he "felt responsible for having spread an urban myth".

The website switched to a voluntary reader contribution model on May 17, 2017, in order to finance the website.

== Editorial board ==
Alsema uses crowd sourcing for his editorial board, using a Facebook page where people can suggest edits. This ensures that the public assists in the fact-checking of the articles as well as the fact that spelling errors are quickly updated.
