= Military ranks of the Colombian Marine Infantry =

Coat of arms of the Colombian Marine Infantry

This is the Marine Infantry section of the Military ranks of the Colombian Armed Forces.
In Colombia, the Marine Infantry is a part of the Colombian Navy and not a full service branch on its own. Being tasked with amphibious and riverine and littoral operations, the MI presents a somewhat odd combination of ranking names derived from the Army, combined with naval insignias.

The tables below display the rank structures and rank insignias for the Colombian Marine Infantry personnel.

== Officers ==
	Ranks and Insignias - Colombian Marine Infantry										
NATO code (Note: Colombia is not a member of NATO, so there is not an official equivalence between the Colombian military ranks and those defined by NATO. The displayed parallel is approximate and for illustration purposes only.)	OF-10	OF-9	OF-8	OF-7	OF-6	OF-5	OF-4	OF-3	OF-2	OF-1	
Colombia	No equivalent										
(in Spanish)	-	General	Teniente General	Mayor General	Brigadier	Coronel	Teniente Coronel	Mayor	Capitán	Teniente	Subteniente
Abbr.	-	GR	TG	MG	BG	CR	TC	MY	CT	TE	ST
(in English)	-	General	Lieutenant General	Major General	Brigadier General	Colonel	Lieutenant Colonel	Major	Captain	Lieutenant	Second Lieutenant

== Non-Commissioned Officers and Infantrymen ==
	Ranks and Insignias - Colombian Marine Infantry									
NATO code	OR-9		OR-8	OR-7	OR-6	OR-5	OR-4	OR-3	OR-2	OR-1
Colombia										No Insignia
(in Spanish)	Sargento Mayor de Comando Conjunto	Sargento Mayor de Comando	Sargento Mayor	Sargento Primero	Sargento Vice Primero	Sargento Segundo	Cabo Primero	Cabo Segundo	Cabo Tercero	Infante Regular
Abbr.	SMCCCIM	SMCCIM	SMCIM	SPCIM	SVCIM	SSCIM	CPCIM	CSCIM	C3CIM	-
(in English)	Joint Command Sergeant Major	Command Sergeant Major	Sergeant Major	First Sergeant	Sergeant First Class	Second Sergeant	First Corporal	Second Corporal	Third Corporal	Private

== See also ==
- Military ranks of the Colombian Armed Forces
- Colombian Marine Infantry
