= USS Rockville =

US/Columbian vessel

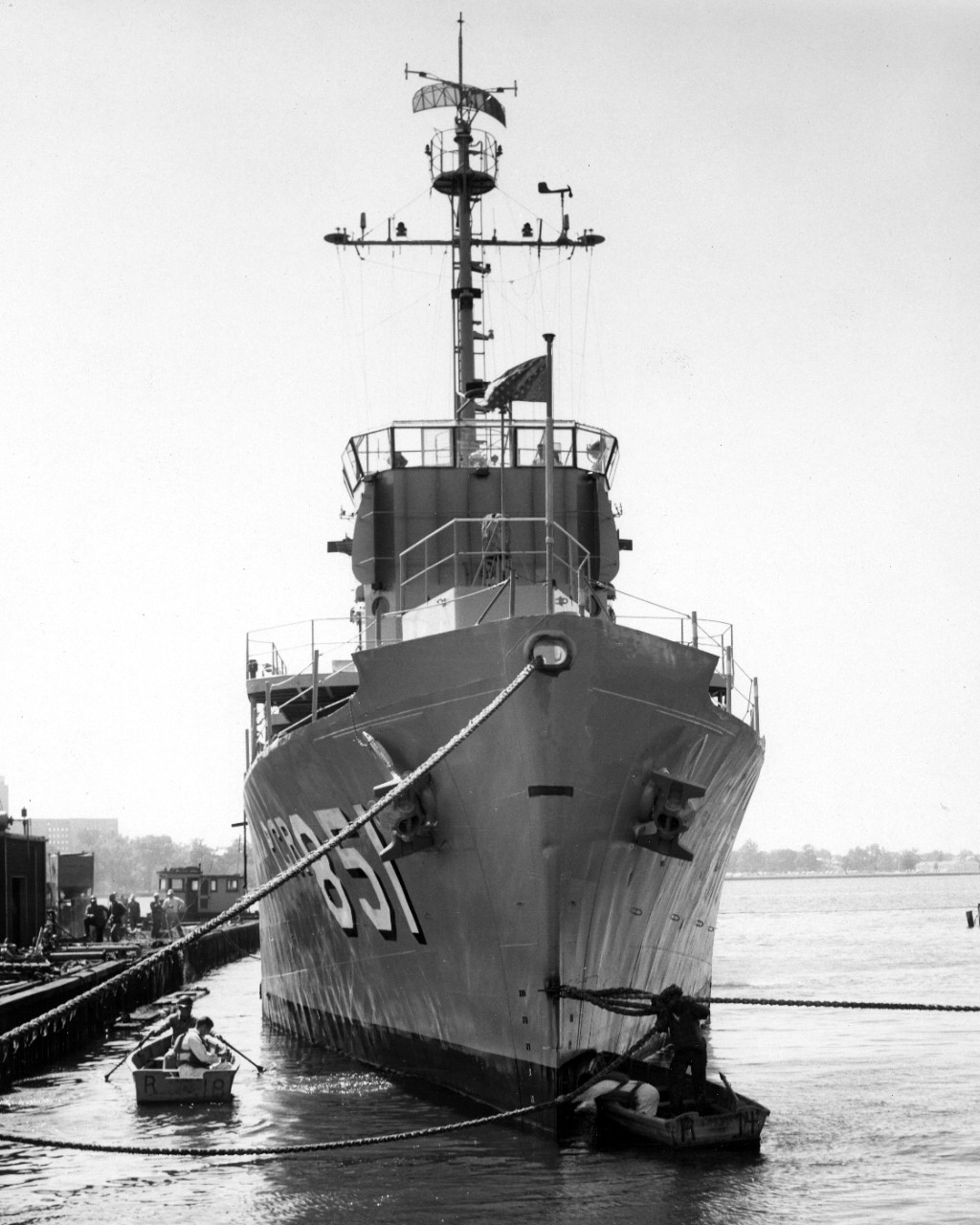
- USS Rockville seen in port sometime in the 1960s.

History

United States
- Name: Rockville
- Namesake: Rockville, Connecticut; Rockville, Maryland
- Operator: United States Navy
- Ordered: June 1943
- Builder: Pullman Standard Car Company, Chicago, Illinois
- Laid down: 18 October 1943
- Launched: 22 February 1944
- Commissioned: 15 May 1944
- Decommissioned: 12 April 1946
- Recommissioned: 22 November 1950
- Decommissioned: 21 December 1968
- Renamed: 15 February 1956
- Reclassified: 15 October 1951
- Stricken: 21 December 1968
- Home port: 1951: Washington, D.C.
- Honours and awards: 3 battle stars
- Fate: Transferred to Colombian Navy
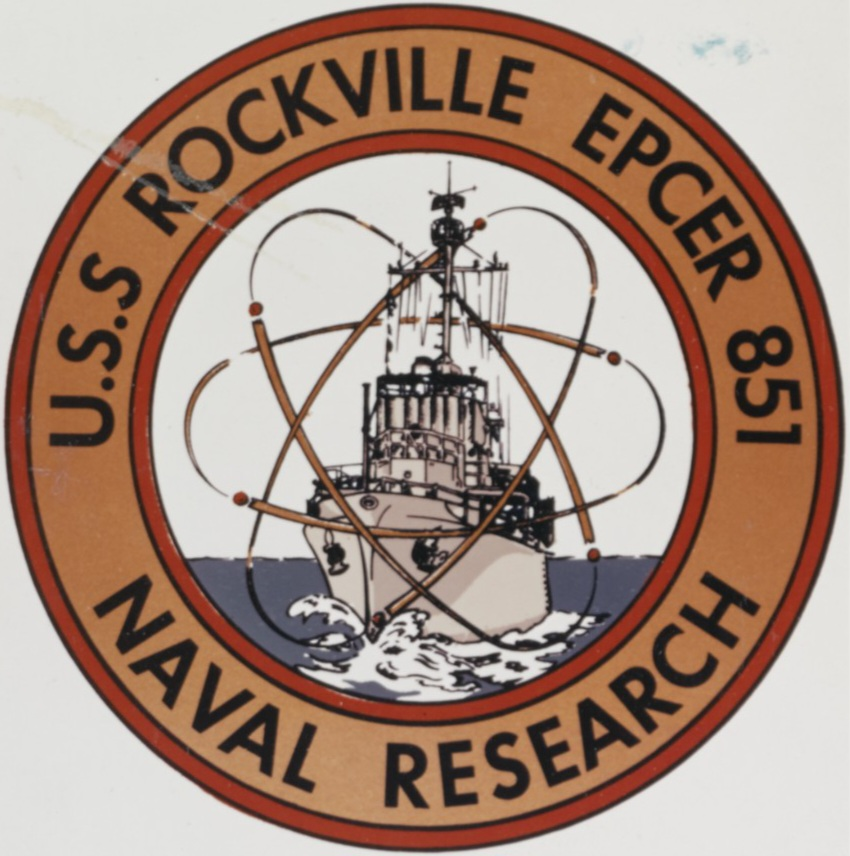
- Badge

History

Colombia
- Name: ARC San Adres (BO 151)
- Acquired: 5 June 1969
- In service: Colombian Navy: 1969-1986
- Fate: Transferred to Colombian Coast Guard

General characteristics
- Class & type: PCE-842-class patrol boat
- Type: 1944: patrol craft escort rescue 1951: experimental patrol craft escort rescue
- Displacement: 903 Long tons
- Length: 184 ft 6 in (56.24 m)
- Beam: 33 ft 1 in (10.08 m)
- Draft: 9 ft 5 in (2.87 m)
- Propulsion: 2 × 6-cylinder, 300 hp (220 kW) General Mortors 12-278A diesel engines providing 2,000 bhp via two shafts
- Speed: 16.4 knots at trial
- Range: 3,500 nmi (6,500 km; 4,000 mi) At max. speed: 2,500 nmi (4,600 km; 2,900 mi)
- Boats & landing craft carried: One whaleboat
- Capacity: 57 patients
- Complement: 1944: 98 crewmembers and 11 medical staff; 1951: 5 officers, 55 enlisted, 12 research staff; 1973: 60; 1979: 50
- Sensors & processing systems: 1961: SPS-5B radar
- Armament: At launch: 1 3" naval gun, 2 40mm., 6 20mm., 2 depth charge projectors, 2 depth charge tracks 1951: None
- Notes: Medical facilities: A surgery, X-ray equipment, 65 hospital beds, accommodations for 57 patients

USS Rockville (EPCER-851), also named USS PCE(R)-851, PCER-851 and ARC San Andres (BO 151), was a PCE-842-class patrol craft of the United States Navy, Colombian Navy, and Columbian Coast Guard. Throughout her service, she served as a hospital ship, survey ship, evacuation ship, and research ship between 1943 and 1986.

== Design and construction ==
USS Rockville was laid down as USS PCER-851 on 18 October 1943 as one of thirteen Patrol Craft Escort Rescue (PCER) ships by the Pullman Standard Car Company of Chicago, Illinois. She was launched on 22 February 1944 and commissioned on 15 May 1944 as a medical rescue ship.

PCER ships was a variation of the PCE-842-class patrol craft, designed to focus in personnel transport and medical evacuation. The class was originally planned to serve as Convoy Rescue Transports (designated as APR), however the idea was abandoned before construction started.

As a medical ship, she was built with an onboard surgery, pharmacy, 65 hospital beds and equipped with x-ray devices with accommodations for 57 patients. The added facilities were crewed by an additional 11 medical staff, bringing the total crew of the ship to 107. The space was facilitated by a longer forecastle that extended for most of the ship's length. The added weight was compensated with less anti-aircraft and anti-submarine weapons compared to the standard PCE-842 design.

A common criticism of the design was the lack of long range surface detection equipment, which forced the crew to manually watch for aircraft. This became exceptionally problematic after the first appearances of kamikazes. The problem was also compounded by the lack of a short range radio, meaning the ship was not able to get any warnings of incoming aircraft from nearby units. This also had the effect of having the crew feel like they were alone in the ocean as they at times had no communication with other vessels.

== Service history ==
=== World War II ===
==== Atlantic service ====
After her commissioning, PCER-851 reported with Task Group 26.1 on 10 July 1944 at Bermuda, where she patrolled the area for the next month. In that time, she escorted allied submarines from Norfolk, Virginia to the British West Indies and transferred the captured crew of U-505 to Newport News, Virginia.

==== Pacific service ====
On 20 August, PCER-851 left the Atlantic, reporting to the US Pacific Fleet on 15 September at Pearl Harbor, Hawaii. Here, she was loaded with additional medical equipment and boarded by additional medical personnel. The following day the ship sailed West, arriving at Milne Bay, New Guinea sometime in October. After her arrival she traveled to Manus before joining Task Force 79.11.3 at Leyte Gulf to escort transports. Afterwards, the ship idled off the coast before the commanding officers of PCER-851 and PCER-852 went ashore and explained the purpose and capabilities of their ship to the beach-master. The ships were then ordered to receive casualties from Dulag Beach on the 20th to 25th in support of an amphibious landing as a part of a "casualty care" mission. After the first few boatloads of wounded were on board, the vessel received a message from a liberty ship requesting assistance. Instead of sending the ship's whaleboat to ferry men ship to ship, PCER-851 pulled up alongside the transport, taking onboard several P-38 Army pilots shot down by friendly fire. This tactic would become standard for all other rescues when weather allowed. On the 25th she was instructed to join Task Group 78.2 off Tacloban. In the afternoon shrapnel detonated one of the ship's 20mm magazines, injuring four.

For the next month she would continue to serve as a part of the casualty care mission near Leyte Gulf. After the Battle off Samar, she handled the injured and survivors of Taffy 3 after the Navy was made aware of her nearby presence. PCER-851 and sister ship PCER-852 began operating in coordination with each other, sharing men and supplies while anchoring together to combine anti-air capabilities. Here, she received the injured and dead from USS Montpelier, USS New Orleans, and USS Lamson, as well as numerous other naval and merchant ships.

The ship accompanied forces going to Ormoc Bay in December before joining Task Group 78.3 as a rescue and evacuation ship during the Mindoro amphibious assaults on15 December. By this time, she was the only rescue ship in the Philippine Islands. PCER-851 suffered a friendly waterline shell hit en route to Mindoro before shooting down a Japanese aircraft, and later on aided in firefighting and survivor rescue. Minor damage was also sustained while pulling alongside the burning USS LST-472. She returned to Leyte the same day before making for Hollandia, New Guinea, where she would remain until February for repairs. On February 3 the ship left for Saipan and arrived eight days later in preparation for the Iwo Jima landings. On February 15 she made for the Volcano Islands to screen the approach, before she focused on beach patrols after arriving at Iwo Jima. On 1 March the ship departed to return to Leyte, escorting a tank landing ship.

PCER-851 left Leyte for Okinawa on 27 March as part of the Southern Attack Force together with Destroyer Squadron 60 with the purpose of screening for the main invasion force. Her low speed made it difficult to follow the force, so she was reassigned to escort a crippled dock landing ship which fell behind the main force.

At 0610 on 1 April about ten miles off Hagushi Beach, a Zeke kamikaze took the crew by surprise before diving on the ship and barley overshooting, crashing astern. The type of ship and the large amount of kamikazes led to a different approach to dealing with the threat. Kamikazes would often follow the tracer fire of ships at dark, so the commander ordered that no guns would be fired at incoming aircraft to deny them a path of approach. To decrease the human loss of attacks, the crew was spaced out above the waterline and below deck when an aircraft was spotted. To further bolster anti-air capabilities, the ship's gunnery officer was traded medical whiskey for single and twin 50 caliber machine guns with aviation personnel.

She would continue patrolling duties until the 6th, where she rescued survivors and bodies from kamikaze damaged ships, including USS LCS-82, Maryland, Laffey, Morrison and Ingraham. The fact that the rescue ships were not designed to come along other ships became apparent when half of the port stanchions and gun tub supports were ripped off when pulling away from the burning Laffey. Due to the damage, 4x4 wood planking was used to shore up the gun platforms until they could be properly tended to by a repair ship.

PCER-851 left the island chain on 28 June, where she docked at Saipan on 4 July and escorted USS Rockwall to Pearl Harbor, arriving on the 19th. The ship underwent repairs at Pearl until mid-August when the war ended. In total, she earned three battle stars during the conflict.

=== Peacetime Service ===
==== East Coast service ====
In mid-October, PCER-851 left Pearl Harbor for the US East Coast, arriving at Norfolk in late November. In January 1946 the ship sailed to New London, Connecticut for operations with the Underwater Sound Laboratory. She left in March before going to Boston, Massachusetts on March 19. On 12 April the ship was decommissioned and entered service as a Naval Reserve training ship to drill reserve sailors of the 1st Naval District until 1950. In June 1950 she was placed in reserve as a commissioned ship. On 22 November 1950 the PCER was recommissioned and served the rest of the year in New England.

On 15 October 1951, she was re-designated as EPCER-851 (experimental patrol craft escort rescue) for use out of Washington DC with the Naval Research Laboratory. At some point with the designation, she was disarmed. Her complement would also change to 5 officers, 55 enlisted, and 12 technical/scientific personnel. She conducted a variety of experiments with the laboratory, including sonar effectiveness, acoustic surveys, and oceanic mapping.

On 15 February 1956 the ship was renamed Rockville after small towns in Connecticut and Maryland, followed by being fitted with an electronics laboratory and workshop. The Rockville conducted sonar testing from the Caribbean to Newfoundland until January 1965. She was later stationed out of Norfolk to continue her mission with members of the Western Electric Company on board.

In 1968 the United States Congress passed the Revenue and Expenditure Control Act of 1968, which reduced the US Navy's budget by US$913 million. To cut costs, the US Atlantic Fleet placed Rockville and 54 other vessels into reduced operational status. In the same year Rockville was ordered inactive, decommissioned and struck from the Navy list on 21 December 1968.

==== Colombian service ====
On 5 June 1969, Rockville was transferred to the Colombian Navy as a survey ship under the name ARC San Andres (BO 151). She was transferred to the Colombian Coast Guard in the 1980s. Sometime later in the 1980s she was once again retired. She was no longer listed as being a part of the Colombian Navy in 1986, and in 1986 ARC San Andres (BO 154) was commissioned into the Navy as a replacement for BO 151.
