= Captain Luis F. Gómez Niño Air Base =

Captain Luis Francisco Gómez Niño Air Base Apiay Air Base
- IATA: API; ICAO: SKAP

Summary
- Airport type: Military
- Operator: Colombian Aerospace Force
- Location: Apiay / Villavicencio, Colombia
- Built: 1933
- In use: 1933-Present
- Commander: Brigadier General Alejandro Vélez Ospina
- Occupants: Combat Air Command No. 2
- Elevation AMSL: 1,211 ft (369 m)
- Coordinates: 04°04′34″N 073°33′46″W
- Website: Colombian Air Force website

Map
- Location of airport in Colombia

Runways
Direction	Length		Surface
Direction	m	ft	Surface
10/28	2,501	8,204	Asphalt
- Source: DAFIF, Aeronáutica Civil

Captain Luis Francisco Gómez Niño Air Base Spanish: Base Aérea Capitán Luis Francisco Gómez Niño (IATA: API, ICAO: SKAP), also known as Apiay Air Base (Base Aérea de Apiay), is a Colombian military base assigned to the Colombian Aerospace Force (Fuerza Aeroespacial Colombiana or FAC) Combat Air Command No. 2 (Comando Aéreo de Combate No. 2 or CACOM 2). It also hosts members of the Colombian Army and Colombian Navy. The base is located in Apiay, near the city of Villavicencio, in the Department of Meta in central Colombia, by the steps of the Andes mountain range and the plains of the Colombian Llanos.

The base also hosts members of the United States Military under a cooperation program under Plan Colombia intended to help the Colombian military with the eradication of illegal drug trade and the illegally armed groups in the Colombian armed conflict.

Apiay has served as base for operations such as Plan Patriota which included operations such as Operation JM. The base received the name as a tribute to Captain Luis Francisco Gómez Niño.

== History ==
The current Combat Air Command No. 2 (Comando Aéreo de Combate No. 2) was established in 1933, in the jungle, with the name San José del Guaviare Air Base (Base Aérea San José del Guaviare). In December 1947 it moved to the village of Apiay, 12 kilometres (7.5 mi) from Villavicencio, to become the Apiay National Airfield (Aeródromo Nacional de Apiay), an auxiliary to Madrid Air Base. In 1956 it was equipped with AT-6 Texan and T-34 Mentor aircraft, to provide training to pilots recently graduated from the Military Aviation School (Escuela Militar de Aviación). In 1959 the unit was elevated to a main base with the assignment of B-26 aircraft moved from the Palanquero Air Base, changing its name to Comando Aéreo de Bombardeo. In 1961 it received the name Luis Francisco Gómez Niño Air Base as a tribute to Captain Luis Francisco Gómez Niño (1896–1934), a Colombian military aviator, founder of Colombian aviation, hero of the Colombian-Peruvian War and decorated with the Grand Cross of Boyacá.

In 1972, the base receives its first jet aircraft, T-33 and T-37, brought from the Combat Air Command No.1, and becoming the headquarters of Combat Air Command No.2.

Today, the air base has responsibility for over 600.000 km^{2} It houses personnel from the Colombian Army and Navy. From there, air and joint operations are coordinated, enabling rapid deployment to the eastern part of the country, a historically sensitive area due to its size and proximity to neighboring countries. Its location, between the Eastern Cordillera and the plains, facilitates both strategic operations and specialized training. Apiay Air Base is a site of international cooperation, particularly with the United States. Within the framework of Plan Colombia, the base has hosted U.S. Army personnel participating in training programs, knowledge exchange, and support for operations against drug trafficking and illegal armed groups operating in the region.

== Facilities ==
Located in the Meta Department, near Villavicencio and at the gateway to the Eastern Plains, this base becomes the closest Colombian military point to the border with Venezuela, which positions it as a key axis for the defense of sovereignty and national security. The air base resides at an elevation of 1,227 feet (374 m) above mean sea level. It has one runway designated 10/28 with an asphalt surface measuring 8,204 by 164 feet (2,501 m × 50 m).

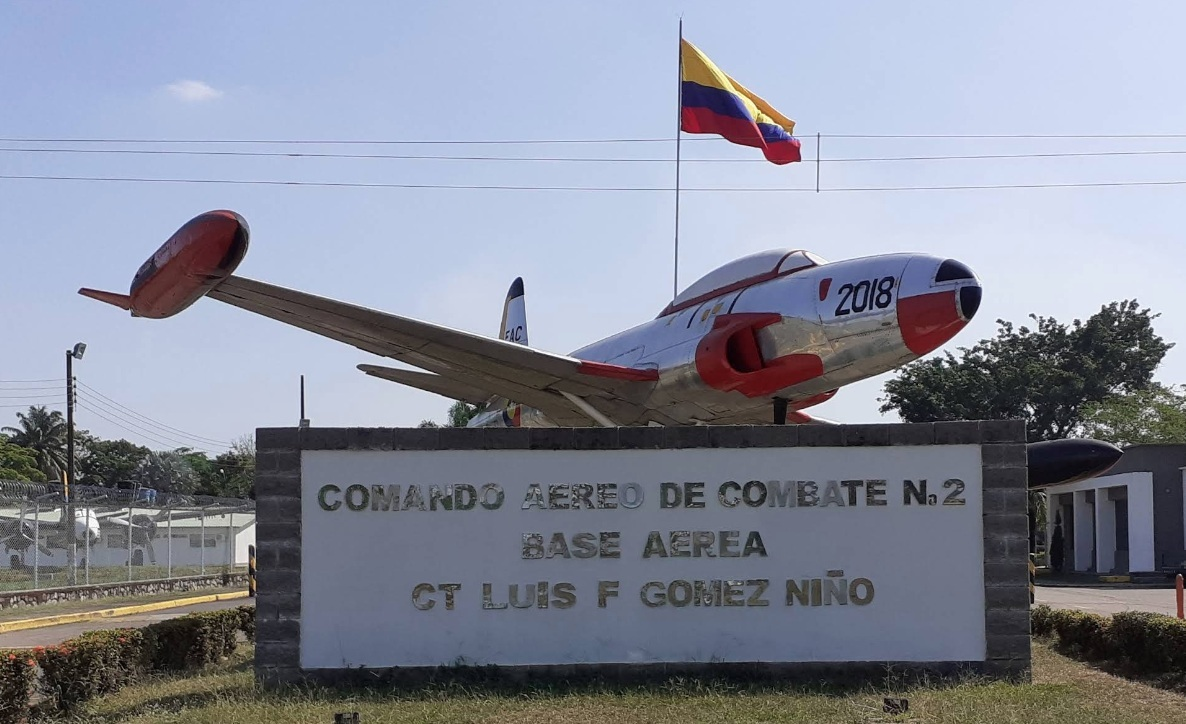
Entrance to air base

== Accidents and incidents ==
- On 8 September 1969, Douglas C-47 FAC-685 of SATENA crashed near Apiay Air Force Base killing all 32 people on board. The aircraft was operating a domestic scheduled passenger flight from Monterrey Airport to Apiay.
