= ARC San Andres =

ARC San Andres may refer to the following ships of the Colombian Navy:

- ARC San Andres (BO 151), a survey ship in the Colombian Navy, formerly USS Rockville, a PCE-842-class patrol vessel in the US Navy
- ARC San Andres (BO 154), a survey ship commissioned to replace San Andres (BO 151)
- ARC San Andres (PO-45), a buoy tender in the Colombian Navy, formerly USCGC Gentian
