= Operation JM =

- Part of Colombian armed conflict and the war on terror
Date	April 2004 – December, 2006
Location	Colombia
Result	Inconclusive: Main objective of Colombian military not accomplished.; FARC was weakened.; 356 guerrilla base camps destroyed.; The Colombian military confiscated 285 rifles, 232 small arms, 57 mortars, 4,162 grenades, 685,542 projectiles of different calibers, 30 tons of explosives of different types and some 4,528 IEDs.

Belligerents
Colombia	FARC

Commanders and leaders
(Colombia) General Gilberto Rocha	Mono Jojoy

Units involved
National Army of Colombia	unknown

Strength
18,000 soldiers	4,350 guerrillas

Casualties and losses
137 killed 1,300 wounded (from combat and illnesses)	233 killed 202 captured 52 surrendered
- 10,000 removed from the service in 2006 combat wounds and leishmaniasis related.

Operation JM (Spanish: Operación JM) was a military operation by the Military of Colombia Joint Task Force OMEGA intended to capture or kill the leaders of the Revolutionary Armed Forces of Colombia guerrilla (FARC), as part of the Plan Patriota. The operations began in April 2004 and after some 30 operations concluded without the main objective being accomplished in December 2006. However, the Colombian military achieved numerous military advances in a region that had been dominated by the guerrillas.

== 2004 ==
Military operations started in April 2004 in the jungle area known as Llanos del Yarí and in the area of the former El Caguan demilitarized zone, between the Departments of Meta, Caqueta and Guaviare. The objective of the first operation was to capture or kill FARC guerrilla leader aka "Mono Jojoy" believed to be the military commander of the FARC, and other three members of the secretariat or higher command of the FARC that were believed to be in the area. According to the Colombian military "Mono Jojoy" managed to evade the operation, but 17 of his men were killed and his main camp site was destroyed.

== 2005 ==
In 2005 land mines and leishmaniasis took a big toll in the Colombian military, some 10,000 soldiers were terminated from the service, this adding to the number of combat casualties suffered.

== 2006 ==
On November 20, 2006, the Joint Task Force OMEGA engaged in combat operations against members of the Southern Bloc of the FARC-EP near the town of Cartagena del Chaira. General Gilberto Rocha announced that three soldiers and 11 rebels were killed.

== Results ==
The main objective of the operation was not accomplished but major advances against the guerrilla were accomplished. Initially the theater of operations covered a total area of 85,000 km² where some 150 thousand civilians live and approximately 4,350 members of the FARC operated. By the end of the operation the Colombian military calculated that there were 2,525 guerrillas still operating in the area. The Colombian military also destroyed some 35,000 h of illegal crops and by the end of operations there were some 15,000 h left to destroy. The Colombian Army also neutralized mobility corridors and road networks that the FARC had set up in the region and recovered fluvial navigation in the Guayabero, Caguan River, Vaupes and Yari rivers. There were also 137 members of the Colombian military killed in action and some 1,300 wounded.
