= Escuela Superior de Guerra =

Escuela Superior de Guerra may refer to:

- Escuela Superior de Guerra (Argentina)
- Escuela Superior de Guerra (Colombia)

== See also ==
- Escola Superior de Guerra, Brazil
