= Fuerte Militar Larandia =

Coordinates: 1°28′44″N 75°29′12″W

The Larandia Army Post is Colombian Military base located in Caqueta, southern Colombia shared by the Colombian National Army, the Colombian National Police, the Colombian Air Force and a small number of United States Military and US civilian personnel giving support and training to Colombian personnel. This Forward Operating Location (FOL) is primarily used since the year 2000 for counter-narcotics operations as established in the Plan Colombia and as training and base facility for helicopters and fumigation aircraft that support the OMEGA combined task force Army unit, spearhead unit that led the Plan Patriota.
