= Seventh Guerrilla Conference of the FARC-EP =

The Seventh Guerrilla Conference of the FARC-EP, was a 1982 meeting of FARC leadership which resulted in a major shift in FARC's strategy.

== Background and resolutions ==
FARC had historically been doing most of its fighting in rural areas, and was limited to small-scale confrontations with Colombian military forces. By 1982, increased income from the "coca boom" allowed them to expand into an irregular army, which would then stage large scale attacks on Colombian troops.

They also began sending fighters to Vietnam and the Soviet Union for advanced military training. They also planned to move closer to middle-sized cities, as opposed to only remote rural areas, and closer to areas rich in natural resources, in order to create a strong economic infrastructure.

== Name change ==
It was also at this conference that FARC added the initials "EP", for "Ejército del Pueblo" or "People's Army", to the organization's name.
