= CIAC =

CIAC may refer to:

== Athletic conferences ==
- Carolinas Intercollegiate Athletic Conference, southeastern United States
- Connecticut Interscholastic Athletic Conference
- Central Intercollegiate Athletic Conference, Kansas and Missouri

== Other uses ==
- Clark International Airport Corporation, Pampanga, Philippines
- Colombian Aeronautical Industry Corporation, or CIAC for its acronym in Spanish
- Community in a Cube, a housing development in Middlesbrough, United Kingdom
- Computer Incident Advisory Capability, at the United States Department of Energy
- CRACK International Art Camp, Rahimpur, Kushtia, Bangladesh
