= Joint Task Force OMEGA =

Joint Task Force OMEGA was named after omega Greek letter meaning "the end" in allusion to the possible end of the armed conflict

Joint Task Force OMEGA (Spanish: Fuerza de tarea conjunta OMEGA) is a joint task force involving the Military of Colombia in support of Plan Patriota (Now replaced by Plan Consolidación) assembled with the main purpose of capturing the leaders of the Revolutionary Armed Forces of Colombia (FARC).

== Mission ==
Its purpose is to conduct military operations, planning, developing and implementing assault operations, surveillance, interdiction, security and support, combating and neutralizing the narco-terrorist organizations, with an emphasis on neutralizing their leaders, their logistics infrastructure, economic base, and precipitate the military defeat of their armed paramilitaries.

== Organization ==
The JTF OMEGA was formed by the best 15,000 soldiers in the military of Colombia selected from the Army, Air Force and Navy. The task force headquarters is located in the Military Fort Larandia in the Department of Caqueta.

=== Field units ===
Field units of the Task Force consist of eight brigades as follows:

- Mobile Brigades 1, 2 and 3 which make up the Rapid Deployment Force (Fuerza de Despliegue Rápido or "FUDRA"), these units are based in La Macarena in the Department of Meta;
- Mobile Brigade No. 6 based in Cartagena del Chairá, Department of Guaviare
- Mobile Brigade No. 7 based in Calamar, Department of Guaviare
- Mobile Brigade No. 9 based in San Vicente del Caguán, Department of Guaviare
- Mobile Brigade No. 10 based in Miraflores, Department of Guaviare
- Mobile Brigade No. 22 based in Peñas Coloradas, Department of Caqueta.

Apart from the land component, the JTF has a river component located in Tres Esquinas, Department of Caqueta, and an aviation component in the bases of Larandia and Apiay.

== Operations ==
Operations left 137 members of the Colombian military killed in action and 1,300 wounded. After the end of Plan Patriota, The Joint Task Force OMEGA was renamed to OMEGA Campaign on December 10, 2006, to support the Plan Consolidación.

== Commanders ==
- General Reinaldo Castellanos (????-2004)
- General Carlos Alberto Fracica (2004–2005)
- General Gilberto Rocha (2005–2006)
- General Alejandro Navas (2006–2008)
- General Javier Alberto Florez Aristizabal (2008–present)

== Guerrilla infiltration scandal ==
During an operation on July 15, 2007, in the jungles of Colombia by the Colombian National Army soldiers of the 17th Counter-Guerrilla Battalion 2nd Mobile Brigade, localized a FARC campsite in the village of Montañitas, in the municipality of Mesetas, Meta Department and after a confrontation with members of FARC's 42nd Front, soldiers found on the body a guerrilla named José Nerup Reyes Peña (the presumed leader of that front), hard discs and USB drives containing information about members of the FARC guerrilla infiltration in the JTF OMEGA. The hard drive contained detailed maps outlining anti-guerrilla operations by Omega.
