= Military ranks of the Colombian Armed Forces =

The military ranks of the Colombian armed forces consist of the list and ordering of the different military ranks, for the Officers, Non-commissioned officers (NCOs) and soldiers, seamen and airmen ("other ranks") of the Military Forces of Colombia. The ranks are visually represented by insignias placed on the uniforms, usually at the shoulders, sleeves and shirt collars.

A literal translation from Spanish to English may be misleading as the rank names do not necessarily follow the customary order used in anglophone military ranks in all cases. Furthermore, Colombia is not a member of NATO, so there is not an official equivalence between the Colombian military ranks and those defined by NATO. The displayed parallel is approximate and for illustration purposes only.

== Applicable law ==
The ranks in the Military Forces of Colombia are regulated through the following applicable legislation: the Decree-Law 1790 of 2000, Law 1405 of 2010, and Law 1792 of 2016

In terms of protocol, the established order for the forces is Army, Navy, Air Force, Police, as established by the Military Rules of Protocol (Reglamento de Protocolo Militar FFMM)

== Army ==
Coat of arms of the Colombian National Army

The Colombian Army is the largest of the three service branches of the Military Forces of Colombia, tasked with defending sovereignty and law and order across the national territory. The tables below display the rank structures and rank insignias for the Colombian Army personnel.

=== Officers ===
Rank group	General / flag officers			Senior officers			Junior officers
Colombian National Army
Colombian National Army	General de ejército	Mayor general	Brigadier general	Coronel	Teniente coronel	Mayor	Capitán	Teniente	Subteniente
Abbr.	GR	MG	BG	CR	TC	MY	CT	TE	ST
'"3B" Uniform sample
Service branch				Cavalry	Infantry	Engineers	Communications	Cavalry	Artillery
Camouflage Fatigues sample
Service branch				Cavalry	Infantry	Engineers	Artillery	Communications	Logistics (Armory)

=== Enlisted ===
Rank group	Senior NCOs							Junior NCOs		Enlisted
Colombian National Army												No insignia
Colombian National Army	Sargento mayor de comando conjunto	Sargento mayor de ejército	Sargento mayor de comando	Sargento mayor	Sargento primero	Sargento viceprimero	Sargento segundo	Cabo primero	Cabo segundo	Cabo tercero	Soldado profesional	Soldado
'"3B" Uniform sample												No Insignia

Soldier types

- Soldado: Conscripted soldier serving for a period of 22 months mandatory service (Note: In 2010, the Constitutional Court (Spanish: Corte Constitucional) on grounds of discrimination and protection of equal rights, issued an order to the Military Forces to stop the classification of conscripts into "regular", "peasant" and "baccalaureate" (Spanish: "regular", "campesino" y "bachiller"), and to standardize the terms and conditions for all conscripts to 22 months.).
- Soldado Profesional: Regular soldiers that stay in the army after completing their 22 months' mandatory conscription service, making it a permanent career. The number in their rank insignia indicating the number of years they have served.

==== Additional ranks ====
Dragoneantes are soldiers who have gained recognition through their achievements and have special training. They have a certain degree of authority over regular soldiers.

Rank group	Dragoneante				Alumno
Insignia
Insignia	Dragoneante mayor de escuela	Dragoneante mayor de batallón	Dragoneante mayor de compañía	Dragoneante	Alumno tercer nivel	Alumno segundo nivel	Alumno primer nivel

== Navy ==
Coat of arms of the Colombian Navy

The Colombian Navy (Spanish: Armada de la República de Colombia) is the maritime service branch of the Military Forces of Colombia, responsible for security and defense in both the Atlantic (Caribbean) and Pacific seas of Colombia, the extensive network of rivers inside the country, and a few small land areas under its direct jurisdiction. The tables below display the rank structures and rank insignias for the Colombian Navy personnel.

=== Officers ===
Rank group	General/flag officers			Senior officers			Junior officers
Colombian National Navy
Colombian National Navy	Almirante	Vicealmirante	Contralmirante	Capitán de navío	Capitán de fragata	Capitán de corbeta	Teniente de navío	Teniente de fragata	Teniente de corbeta
Abbr.	ALM	VALM	CALM	CN	CF	CC	TN	TF	TK

=== Enlisted ===
Rank group	Senior NCOs						Junior NCOs		Enlisted
Colombian National Navy
Colombian National Navy	Suboficial jefe técnico de comando conjunto	Suboficial jefe técnico de comando	Suboficial jefe técnico	Suboficial jefe	Suboficial primero	Suboficial segundo	Suboficial tercero	Marinero primero	Marinero segundo
Abbr.	SJTCC	SJTC	SJT	SJ	S1	S2	S3	MA1	MA2

== Marine Infantry ==
Coat of arms of the Colombian Marine Infantry

In Colombia, the Marine Infantry is a Corps depending on the Colombian Navy and not a full service branch on its own. Being tasked with amphibious and riverine and littoral operations, the MI presents a combination of ranking names derived from the Army, combined with naval insignias. The tables below display the rank structures and rank insignias for the Colombian Marine Infantry personnel.

=== Officers ===
Rank group	General/flag officers					Senior officers			Junior officers
Colombian Naval Infantry
Colombian Naval Infantry		General		Mayor general	Brigadier general	Coronel	Teniente coronel	Mayor	Capitán	Teniente	Subteniente
Abbr.	-	GR	-	MG	BG	CR	TC	MY	CT	TE	ST	-

=== Enlisted ===
Rank group	Senior NCOs						Junior NCOs		Enlisted
Colombian Naval Infantry										No insignia
Colombian Naval Infantry	Sargento mayor de comando conjunto	Sargento mayor de comando	Sargento mayor	Sargento primero	Sargento vice primero	Sargento segundo	Cabo primero	Cabo segundo	Cabo tercero	Infante regular
Abbr.	SMCCCIM	SMCCIM	SMCIM	SPCIM	SVCIM	SSCIM	CPCIM	CSCIM	C3CIM	-

== Aerospace Force ==
Coat of arms of the Colombian Air Force

The Colombian Aerospace Force is the service branch of the Military Forces of Colombia tasked with the protection and defense of the Colombian sovereign airspace. The tables below display the rank structures and rank insignias for the Colombian Aerospace Force personnel.

=== Officers ===
Rank group	General/Flag/Air officers			Senior officers			Junior officers
Colombian Aerospace Force
Colombian Aerospace Force	General del aire	Mayor general del aire	Brigadier general del aire	Coronel	Teniente coronel	Mayor	Capitán	Teniente	Subteniente
Abbr.	GR	MG	BG	CR	TC	MY	CT	TE	ST
"3B" Uniform sample

=== Enlisted ===
Rank group	Senior NCOs						Junior NCOs		Enlisted
Colombian Aerospace Force
Colombian Aerospace Force	Técnico jefe de comando conjunto	Técnico jefe de comando	Técnico jefe	Técnico subjefe	Técnico primero	Técnico segundo	Técnico tercero	Técnico cuarto	Aerotécnico
Abbr.	TJCC	TJC	TJ	TS	TP	T2	T3	T4	AT	-

== 2010-2016 ranks ==
Rank group	General / flag officers				Senior officers			Junior officers
Colombian National Army
Colombian National Army	General de Ejercito	Teniente General	Mayor General	Brigadier General	Coronel	Teniente Coronel	Mayor	Capitán	Teniente	Subteniente
Colombian National Navy
Colombian National Navy	Almirante	Almirante de Escuadra	Vicealmirante	Contralmirante	Capitán de Navío	Capitán de Fragata	Capitán de Corbeta	Teniente de Navío	Teniente de Fragata	Teniente de Corbeta
Colombian Naval Infantry
Colombian Naval Infantry	General	Teniente General	Mayor General	Brigadier	Coronel	Teniente Coronel	Mayor	Capitán	Teniente	Subteniente
Colombian Aerospace Force
Colombian Aerospace Force	General del Aire	Teniente General del Aire	Mayor General del Aire	Brigadier General del Aire	Coronel	Teniente Coronel	Mayor	Capitán	Teniente	Subteniente

== Pre 2010 ranks ==
Rank group	Senior NCOs						Junior NCOs		Enlisted
Colombian Aerospace Force										No equivalent
Colombian Aerospace Force	Técnico Jefe de Comando Conjunto	Técnico Jefe de Comando	Técnico Jefe	Técnico Subjefe	Técnico Primero	Técnico Segundo	Técnico Tercero	Técnico Cuarto	Aerotécnico	No equivalent

== See also ==
- Ranks of the Colombian National Police
