= USS LST-738 =

Tank landing ship

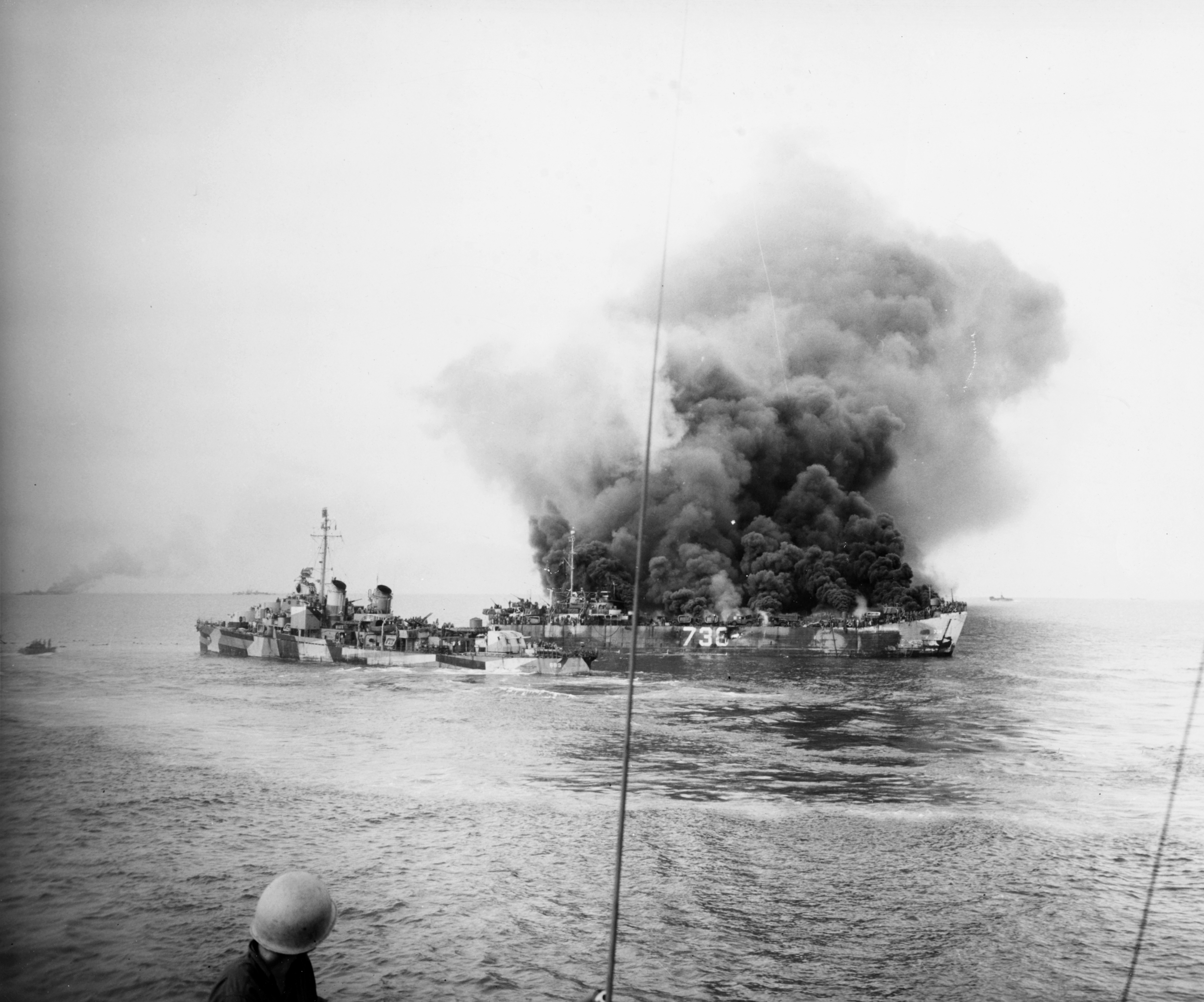
- LST-738 burning after she was hit by a kamikaze off the Mindoro landing beaches, 15 December 1944. USS Moale (DD-693) is nearby. Note the hole in LST-738's starboard side, just forward of the large "738" painted there. Smoke in the left distance may be from LST-472, which was also hit by the kamikaze attack.

History

United States
- Builder: Dravo Corporation, Neville Island
- Laid down: 20 February 1944
- Launched: 1 April 1944
- Commissioned: 9 May 1944
- Stricken: 19 January 1945
- Honours and awards: 2 battle stars (World War II)
- Fate: Sunk in action, 15 December 1944

General characteristics
- Class & type: LST-542-class tank landing ship
- Displacement: 1,780 long tons (1,809 t) light; 3,640 long tons (3,698 t) full
- Length: 328 ft (100 m)
- Beam: 50 ft (15 m)
- Draft: Unloaded : 2 ft 4 in (0.71 m) forward; 7 ft 6 in (2.29 m) aft; Loaded : 8 ft 2 in (2.49 m) forward; 14 ft 1 in (4.29 m) aft
- Propulsion: 2 × General Motors 12-567 diesel engines, two shafts, twin rudders
- Speed: 12 knots (22 km/h; 14 mph)
- Troops: Approximately 130 officers and enlisted men
- Complement: 8-10 officers, 89-100 enlisted men
- Armament: 1 × single 3"/50 caliber gun mount; 8 × 40 mm guns; 12 × 20 mm guns

USS LST-738 was an LST-542-class tank landing ship built for the United States Navy during World War II.

LST-738 was laid down on 20 February 1944 at Pittsburgh, Pennsylvania by the Dravo Corporation of Neville Island; launched on 1 April 1944; sponsored by Mrs. John S. Mason; and commissioned on 9 May 1944.

== Service history ==
During World War II LST-738 was assigned to the Asiatic-Pacific theater and participated in the Leyte landings in October 1944 and the Mindoro landings in December.

On 15 December 1944, while off the southern tip of Mindoro, she was hit by a Japanese kamikaze plane and set ablaze. After attempts to control the fires were unsuccessful, LST-738 was abandoned and sunk by the guns of other ships of the invasion fleet.

USS LST-738 earned two battle stars for her World War II service.

== The attack ==
On 15 December 1944, LST-738 was one of thirty LSTs in Task Unit 78.34, under the command of Captain Richard Webb. The Task Unit was operating in support of the landings at Mindoro, scheduled for that day. A group of approximately ten Mitsubishi A6M 'Zeke', Nakajima Ki-44 'Tojo' and Ki-43 'Oscar' single seat fighters, and Nakajima B5N 'Kate' three seat torpedo bombers began their attack on the Task Unit shortly after 09:10, as the LSTs were positioning for their landings. Ships within range opened fire, shooting down several of the attackers. Two Kates that survived the initial anti-aircraft fire made a run on LST-738 at a low altitude. Anti-aircraft fire from LST-738 and USS Moale (DD-693) hit both planes, but they continued in spite of the damage. The first Kate crashed onto LST-738 amidships, just above the waterline. There was an explosion from the plane's bombs, and a fire from the plane's wreckage. The second Kate dove for LST-738's bridge, but missed and was shot down by Moale, crashing to the port of LST-738.

Damage control parties went to work fighting fires, but the crash had damaged LST-738's fire mains making the fires hard to control. The commanding officer ordered the army troops on board to abandon ship.

LST-738's crew flooded her magazines, which made fire fighting even more difficult. In her hold were drums of aviation gas and a load of oxygen bottles, a certain combination for massive explosions if the fire reached them. A second explosion ripped through the ship, and most of the crew abandoned ship. At that time, Captain J. T. Barnett, the Pharmacist Mate, and a radioman last of the crew still aboard. The Captain destroyed the IFF radar and the SOS radar, then ordered the radioman to the stern and to abandon ship.

A third explosion then threw the Captain and Pharmacist Mate to the bridge deck. The Captain then determined that all hope was lost and that if Moale was to come alongside, it would not help save the ship. The Captain waited to see if Moale wished to come alongside, but a fourth explosion threw him to the deck. Moale backed off rapidly.

The water around LST-738 was covered in oil, and was burning, and a few personnel were observed working hard to swim away. After the Pharmacist Mate jumped over the side, both sides of the ship, the Captain checked for personnel hanging on lines. Several were observed and were ordered away from the ship. The Captain, the last man on board, then went over the side.

The fourth blast had put a hole in Moale's bow, killing one of her men and wounding ten others. As for LST-738's crew, no one had died, but several men were injured in the crash, fire and explosions. LST-738 was abandoned as a burning hulk. The next morning she was sunk by destroyer USS Hall (DD-583) at 12°19′N 121°05′E.
