= USS LST-472 =

LST-1-class tank landing ship

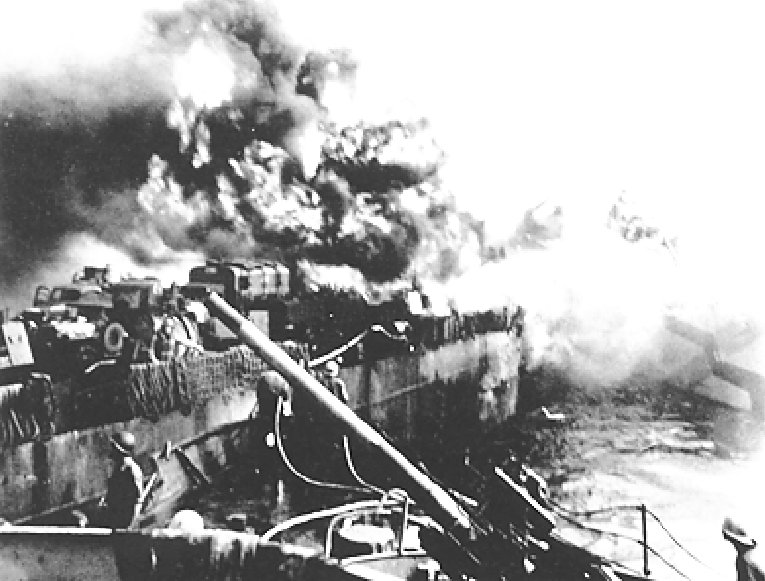
- USS LST-472 after Kamikaze attack at Mindoro Island, 19 December 1944.

History

United States
- Name: LST-472
- Ordered: as a Type S3-M-K2 hull, MCE hull 992
- Builder: Kaiser Shipbuilding Company, Vancouver, Washington
- Yard number: 176
- Laid down: 31 October 1942
- Launched: 7 December 1942
- Commissioned: 13 March 1943
- Stricken: 19 January 1945
- Identification: Hull symbol: LST-472; Code letters: NGDC
- Honors and awards: 6 × battle stars
- Fate: Sunk in action, 21 December 1944

General characteristics
- Class & type: LST-1-class tank landing ship
- Displacement: 4,080 long tons (4,145 t) full load; 2,160 long tons (2,190 t) landing
- Length: 328 ft (100 m) oa
- Beam: 50 ft (15 m)
- Draft: Full load: 8 ft 2 in (2.49 m) forward; 14 ft 1 in (4.29 m) aft; Landing at 2,160 t: 3 ft 11 in (1.19 m) forward; 9 ft 10 in (3.00 m) aft
- Installed power: 2 × 900 hp (670 kW) Electro-Motive Diesel 12-567A diesel engines; 1,700 shp (1,300 kW)
- Propulsion: 1 × Falk main reduction gears; 2 × Propellers
- Speed: 12 kn (22 km/h; 14 mph)
- Range: 24,000 nmi (44,000 km; 28,000 mi) at 9 kn (17 km/h; 10 mph) while displacing 3,960 long tons (4,024 t)
- Boats & landing craft carried: 2 or 6 x LCVPs
- Capacity: 2,100 tons oceangoing maximum; 350 tons main deckload
- Troops: 16 officers, 147 enlisted men
- Complement: 13 officers, 104 enlisted men
- Armament: Varied, ultimate armament; 2 × twin 40 mm (1.57 in) Bofors guns; 4 × single 40 mm Bofors guns; 12 × 20 mm (0.79 in) Oerlikon cannons

Service record
- Operations: New Georgia Campaign; New Georgia-Rendova-Vangunu occupation (4 July 1943); Treasury-Bougainville operation; Occupation and defense of Cape Torokina (10–13 November, 3–4 December 1943); Bismarck Archipelago operations; Green Island landing (15–19 February 1944); Hollandia operation (21–28 April 1944); Western New Guinea operations; Toem-Wakde-Sarmi area operation (26–28 May 1944); Biak Islands operation (6–10, 12–16 June 1944); Noemfoor Island operation (2–4, 6–11 July 1944); Cape Sansapor operation (4–10, 12–18 August 1944); Morotai landing (15 September 1944); Luzon operation; Mindoro landings (12–18 December 1944)
- Awards: Combat Action Ribbon; Navy Unit Commendation; American Campaign Medal; Asiatic–Pacific Campaign Medal; World War II Victory Medal; Philippine Republic Presidential Unit Citation; Philippine Liberation Medal

USS LST-472 was a United States Navy LST-1-class tank landing ship used in the Asiatic-Pacific Theater during World War II. As with many of her class, the ship was never named. Instead, she was referred to by her hull designation.

== Construction ==
LST-472 was laid down on 31 October 1942, under United States Maritime Commission (MARCOM) contract, MC hull 992, by Kaiser Shipyards, Vancouver, Washington; launched 7 December 1942; sponsored by Mrs. Frank C. Huntoon; and commissioned on 13 March 1943.

== Service history ==
During World War II, LST-472 was assigned to the Asiatic-Pacific theater and participated in the following operations: the consolidation of the southern Solomons in June 1943; the New Georgia Campaign, the New Georgia-Rendova-Vangunu occupation in July 1943; the Treasury-Bougainville operation, the Occupation and defense of Cape Torokina in November and December 1943; the Bismarck Archipelago operations, the Green Island landing in February 1944; the Hollandia operation in April 1944; Western New Guinea operations, the Toem-Wakde-Sarmi area operation in May 1944, the Biak Islands operation in June 1944, the Noemfoor Island operation in July 1944, the Cape Sansapor operation in August 1944, and the Morotai landing in September 1944; and the Luzon operation, the Mindoro landings in December 1944.

LST-472 was sunk during action with the enemy off Mindoro Island, Philippines, on 21 December 1944, and struck from the Navy list on 19 January 1945.

The wreck is located at 12°19′N 121°05′E

== Honors and awards ==
LST-472 earned six battle stars and the Navy Unit Commendation for World War II service.

== See also ==
- List of United States Navy LSTs
- List of United States Navy losses in World War II

== Notes ==
Citations

== Bibliography ==
Online resources

- "LST-472". Dictionary of American Naval Fighting Ships. Naval History and Heritage Command. 3 August 2015. This article incorporates text from this source, which is in the public domain.
- "Kaiser Vancouver, Vancouver WA". ShipbuildingHistory.com. 27 November 2010.
- "USS LST-472". NavSource. 31 October 2014.
- Helgason, Guðmundur. "USS LST 472 (LST 472)".
