= CIAC (company) =

Colombian aerospace company

Colombian Aeronautical Industry Corporation
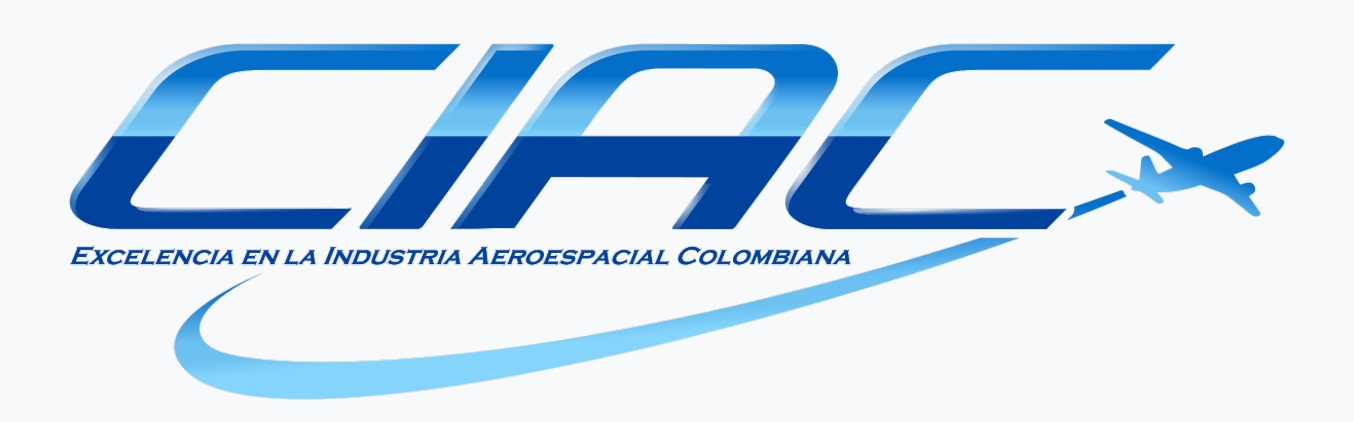
- Native name: Spanish: Corporación de la Industria Aeronáutica Colombiana (CIAC)
- Company type: State-owned company
- Industry: Aerospace and Defense
- Founded: May 9, 1956; 70 years ago
- Headquarters: Bogotá, Colombia
- Area served: Worldwide
- Products: Military aircraft Aircraft Component; Aircraft Services; Defense; Engineering
- Parent: Ministry of Defense of Colombia (89%)
- Website: ciac.gov.co

The Colombian Aeronautical Industry Corporation (Spanish: Corporación de la Industria Aeronáutica Colombiana), is a Colombian aerospace company involved in aircraft design.

== History ==
The CIAC, since its establishment on 9 May 1956, has operated as a state-owned enterprise first as a stand-alone entity and later absorbed by the Ministry of National Defense of Colombia in 1966.

== Services ==
- Engineering work packages; design, development, testing
- Manufacturing subcontracts
- Aircraft Maintenance Repair and Overhaul (MRO)
- Engine Maintenance and Overhaul (MRO)

== Facilities ==
The CIAC operates hangars located on the premises of El Dorado International Airport, in Bogotá, and on Major Justino Mariño Cuesto Air Base in Madrid, Cundinamarca, where it mainly serves the Colombian Aerospace Force.

Together with Sikorsky-Colombia, CIAC manages the only Black Hawk Flight Simulator Center in Latin America, at the Tolemaida Air Base, where personnel from the Military Forces of Colombia, the National Police of Colombia, and the Brazilian Armed Forces train to operate the Sikorsky UH-60 Black Hawk helicopter.

== Products ==
=== Aircraft ===
- CIAC T-90 Calima, license built Lancair Legacy for the Colombian Aerospace Force

=== UAVs ===
- ART Quimbaya
- UAV Coelum

=== Others ===
- Airbus Defence and Space; Co-development of the SIRTAP unmanned aircraft system
- Embraer; Subcontractor for the Embraer EMB 314 Super Tucano
- Honeywell; as Authorized Warranty and Repair Station
- Sikorsky Aircraft; as subcontractor supplying parts and flight simulator training for Sikorsky UH-60 Black Hawk helicopters

== Development projects ==
CIAC, jointly with Airbus Defence and Space, is developing a high-performance ISR unmanned aerial system which is projected to have its maiden flight in late 2025. The SIRTAP has been in development since 2019 and it is expected to be incorporated into the Spanish Air and Space Force by 2026. The CIAC has previously developed other UAVs, including the indigenous ART Quimbaya and the Coelum, which has assisted in the development of the project with Airbus.

== See also ==
- COTECMAR
- INDUMIL
