= Colombian Naval Infantry =

- Infanteria de Marina de Colombia
- Coat of Arms of the Colombian Naval Infantry
- Founded: September 17, 1810 - Foundation of Colombian Armada, March 8, 1940 First official battalions.
- Country: Colombia
- Branch: Colombian Navy
- Type: Marines
- Role: Amphibious warfare
- Size: 22,000 (2020)
- Garrison/HQ: Colombian Ministry of Defense, Coveñas & Cartagena
- Motto: Voluntas Omnia Superat - Willpower overcomes everything
- Colors: Scarlet & Blue
- Anniversaries: January 10
- Engagements: Battle of Lake Maracaibo, Thousand Days War (Civil war), War Against Peru, Korean War, Colombian Armed Conflict

Commanders
- Current commander: Major General Luis Gomez Vazquez
- Notable commanders: José Prudencio Padilla

Insignia
- Flag

The Colombian Naval Infantry, also referred to as Colombian Marines (Spanish: Infantería de Marina Colombiana), is the marine force of the Colombian National Armada. The 53,123-member Colombian Marine Infantry is organized into a single division with four brigades (one amphibious assault brigade and three riverine brigades), each with several battalions plus numerous small security units.

== History ==
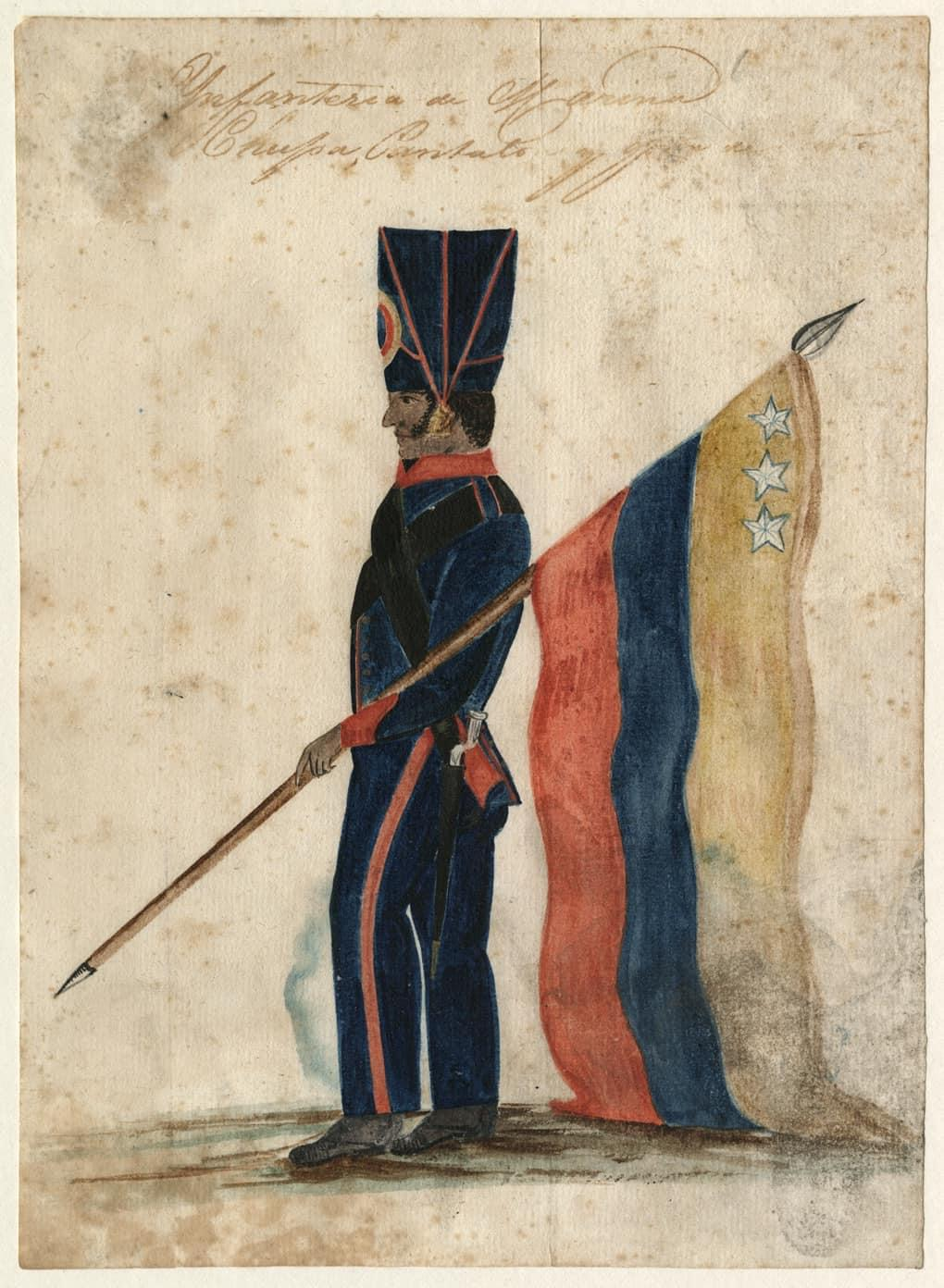
A standard-bearer of the Marine Infantry battalion of the Gran Colombian Navy in 1823.

The Naval Infantry is a constituent part of the Navy whose origins date back to the wars of independence. Today's Colombian Marines trace their heritage and military traditions from the Gran Colombia Marine Corps raised in 1822, by orders of Major General and Vice-president Francisco de Paula Santander, with Captain Diego Antonio García, who was appointed commander of the 6th Marine Company raised that year, being appointed Commandant that October.

Reactivated by an order from President Dr. Alfonso López Pumarejo on January 12, 1937, The Colombian Marines started out as a 120-strong Marine Company, located at the Cartagena Naval Base.

On March 8, 1940, the 1st Marine Battalion was raised, with three companies to cover Bolivar, Putumayo and the San Andres Islands, then in 1943 was assigned to Buenaventura, Barranquilla, Puerto Leguizamo and the eastern plains.

In 1944, a heavy weapons company was raised and the battalion was moved to facilities adjacent to the San Pedro Claver convent in Cartagena. With the advent of La Violencia, in 1952 the Marines were reassigned to the Eastern Naval Force due to the appearance of subversives in this area, and in a year, with the transfer of personnel from the National Army of Colombia, the number of personnel serving increased.

In July 1955, thanks to the instruction of officers and NCOs in the United States in the United States Naval Academy, The Basic School of the United States Marine Corps and the United States Marine Corps School of Infantry and the U.S. mission of the United States Marine Corps aimed for this effort, the Naval Infantry began training and forming its personnel for amphibious warfare operations.

On April 9, 1956, the Marine Corps Basic and Formation School was opened, headquartered at first in Turbaco (Bolivar), then moved to Carne (Cartagena) and is today currently located in Covenas.

By 1957, the Marine Fluvial Commands were officially raised with the first unit being called "Flotilla Avispa", and thus its formal foundation marked a new chapter in the Naval Infantry history, as the Fluvial Commands were mandated to secure the nation's inland waters.

On July 3, 1958, the Colombian Naval Academy had its first 8 Marine Second Lieutenants commissioned.

In 1964, the Marine Infantry Directoriate of the Navy was established and became the Naval Infantry Command in 1967, the very same year that, led by CPT Jaime Arias Arango and with the advice of the then Commandant, COL Jorge Sánchez, the Marine Amphibious Commando specialty arm was officially introduced into the service.

=== Dates of importance to the Naval Infantry ===
The Naval Infantry Training Base, based in Covenas, began its work in 1975, with its mission of training men and women to join the ranks of the Naval Infantry and to prepare to perform its duties of defending the territorial and maritime integrity of the Colombian nation through basic military training through its Instruction Battalions before moving to the regular units of the Naval Infantry nationwide.

Since January 15, 1984, the Naval Infantry is a designated principal combatant command of the Navy, with its primary responsibility being amphibious and seaborne defense of the maritime and land territories of the Republic. Its motto is "La Voluntad Todo Lo Supera" ("Will Surpasses Everything").

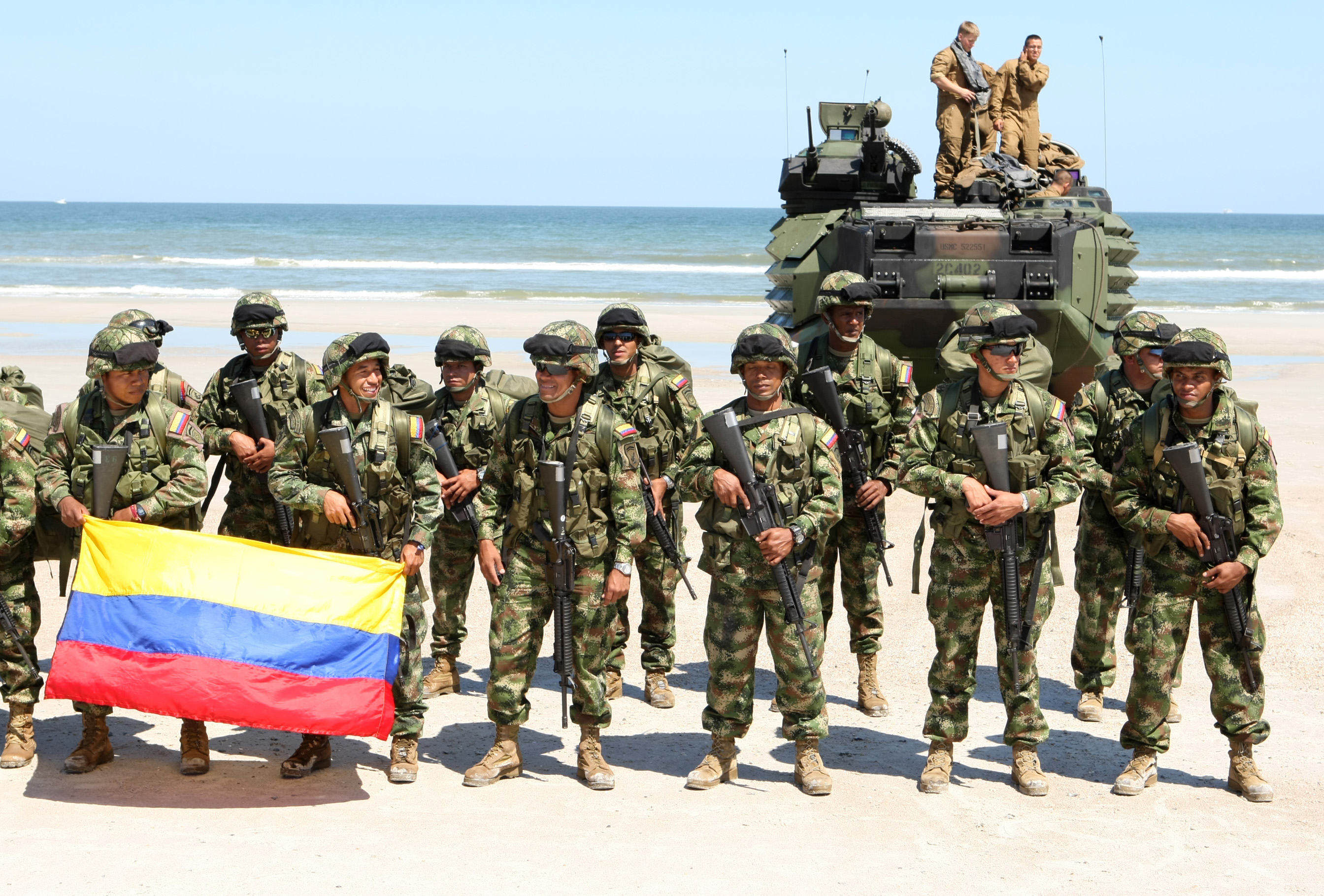
Colombian Marines

Since then, the Marines have had several changes in line with the operational situation of the armed forces and the needs of public order in Colombia.

Traditionally all-male for much of its history, the Corps admitted its first female students of the Marine Training Base and the Basic School in 2024.

== Personnel ==
The Colombian Marine Infantry fields approximately 22,000 personnel, among officers and Infantrymen, and it is by far the biggest Corps within the Navy.

=== Ranks & Insignias ===
The tables below display the rank structures and rank insignias for the Colombian Naval Infantry personnel.

As a general rule the Corps uses Army rank titles while keeping naval-style insignia.

Officer ranks

Rank group	General/flag officers			Senior officers			Junior officers
Colombian Naval Infantry
Colombian Naval Infantry	General	Mayor general	Brigadier general	Coronel	Teniente coronel	Mayor	Capitán	Teniente	Subteniente

Other ranks

Rank group	Senior NCOs						Junior NCOs		Enlisted
Colombian Naval Infantry										No insignia
Colombian Naval Infantry	Sargento mayor de comando conjunto	Sargento mayor de comando	Sargento mayor	Sargento primero	Sargento vice primero	Sargento segundo	Cabo primero	Cabo segundo	Cabo tercero	Infante regular

== Organization ==
=== Marine Infantry Training Base ===
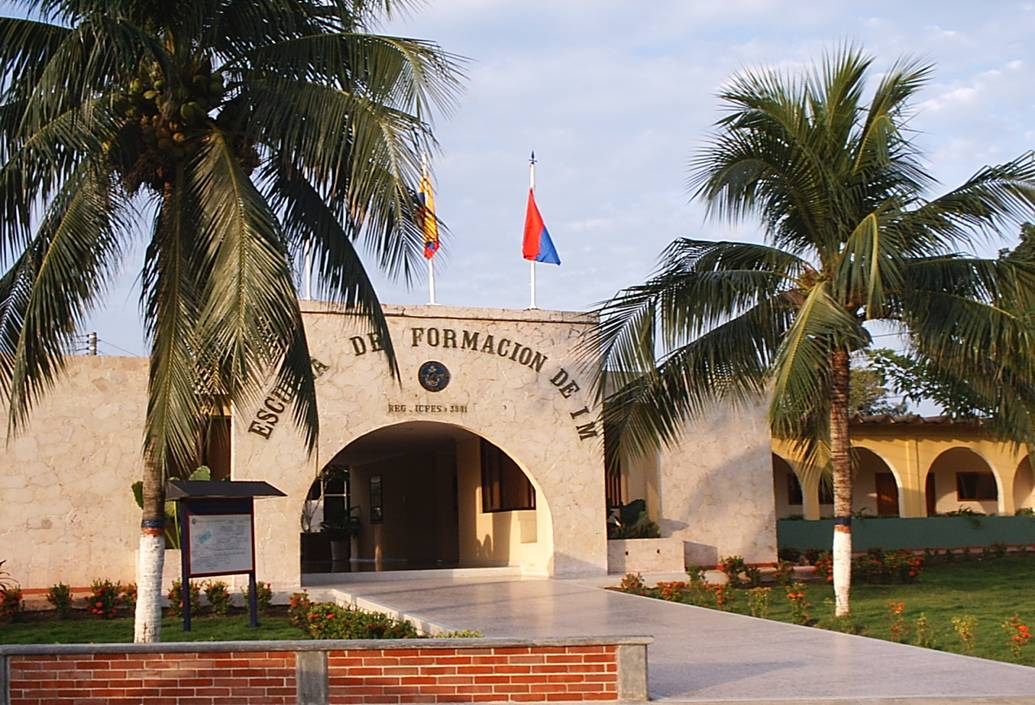
Base de Entrenamiento de Infantería de Marina, in Coveñas

The Marine Training Base (Base de entrenamiento de infanteria de marina "BEIM") is located in a small town called Coveñas, Sucre Department, in the caribbean north of Colombia. It has 3 training battalions for recruits' boot camp training (BINIM, Batallón de Instrucción de Infantería de Marina) for both men and women. A 13-week training program is performed under supervision of the United States Naval Mission by a Gunnery Sergeant of the United States Marine Corps. Graduates of the BEIM advance to the Marine Basic School for continued training.

The BEIM also has an Specialists Center (CIEAN: Centro Internacional de Entrenamiento Anfibio), where professional marine enlisted personnel and NCOs (Coporals - Sergeants) receive special training courses: Drill instructor, Anti-explosives, K-9 handler, Personal defense, Shooter and Water survival. The training in this center is also supervised by the Gunnery Sergeant of the US Naval Mission.

There is also the Batallón de Comando y Apoyo de IM Nº 6 (BACAIM6) in charge of the watch and security of the surrounding areas of the base and some sectors of the Sucre Department.

=== First Marine Infantry Brigade ===
- Brigada de Infantería de Marina No.1

Is a minor operative unit with the main purpose of neutralizing narcoterrorism. Mainly operated in the Caribbean Region of Colombia, in the area of Montes de María.

- Batallón de Fusileros de I.M. N° 2
- Batallón de Fusileros de I.M. N° 3
- Batallón de Fusileros de I.M. N° 4
- Batallón de Contraguerrillas de I.M. N° 1
- Batallón de Contraguerrillas de I.M. N° 2
- Batallón de Comando Y Apoyo de I.M. N° 1

=== First Riverine Marine Infantry Brigade ===
- Brigada Fluvial de Infantería de Marina No. 1

The First Fluvial Brigade of the Naval Infantry was founded with the main purpose of grouping the direction, organization and control of all fluvial units of the former Fluvial Fleet of Magdalena and the Oriente.

- Batallón Fluvial de I.M. No.20 Turbo – Antioquia
- Batallón Fluvial de I.M. No.30 Yati – Bolivar
- Batallón Fluvial de I.M. No.40 Puerto Carreño - Vichada
- Batallón Fluvial de I.M. No.50 Puerto Inirida – Guainia

=== Second Riverine Marine Infantry Brigade ===
- Brigada Fluvial de Infantería de Marina No.2

The Second Fluvial Brigade of the Naval Infantry is based in Buenaventura, Valle del Cauca Department.

- Batallón de Asalto Fluvial de I.M. N° 1 Buenaventura-valle
- Batallón de Asalto Fluvial de I.M. N° 3 Bahia Solano - Choco
- Batallón de Asalto Fluvial de I.M. N° 4 Bahia Malaga – Valle
- Batallón Fluvial De Im N° 10 Guapi - Cauca
- Batallón Fluvial De Im N° 70 Tumaco – Nariño
- Batallón Fluvial De Im N° 80 Buenaventura-valle
- Batallón De Comando Y Apoyo De Im N° 3 Buenaventura-valle

=== Third Riverine Marine Infantry Brigade ===
- Brigada Fluvial de Infantería de Marina No.3

The Third Fluvial Brigade of the Naval Infantry is based in Puerto Leguizamo, Putumayo Department.

- Batallón Fluvial de I.M. Nº 60 Puerto Leguízamo - Putumayo
- Batallón Fluvial de I.M. Nº 90 Tres Esquinas - Caquetá
- Batallón Fluvial de I.M. Nº 100 Barrancón - Guaviare
- Batallón de Asalto Fluvial I.M. Nº 2 Tres Esquinas - Caquetá

=== Riverine Task Group ===
- Grupo de Tarea Fluvial

The Fluvial Tasks Group is a minor operative unit created on February 16, 2004, to participate in the Joint Task Force OMEGA which participates in operations part of the Plan Patriota.

- Unidad De Tarea Fluvial del Caqueta. Tres Esquinas – Caqueta
- Unidad De Tarea Fluvial del Guaviare. San Jose Del Guaviare
- Batallón De Asalto Fluvial de I.M. N° 2. Tres Esquinas – Caqueta

=== Equipment ===
==== APCs ====
- RUS/COL BTR-80 Caribe - non in service. Just 1 show BTR was received, it is in the ARC museum.

==== Hovercraft ====
- UK Griffon 2000TD hovercraft - 8 in service.

==== Trucks ====
- USA Navistar 7000MV - 42 In service
- JPN/COL Chevrolet NPR
- USA/COL Chevrolet Kodiak
