= Colombian Coast Guard =

Cuerpo de Guardacostas de la Armada de Colombia
- Founded: 2 August 1979 (47 years, 2 months)
- Country: Colombia
- Type: Coast guard
- Role: Admiralty law Maritime rescue Naval warfare
- Size: 777
- Part of: Colombian Navy
- Headquarters: Ministerio de Defensa Nacional, Bógota, D.C., Colombia
- Motto: Servir a la Humanidad Protegiendo la Vida en el Mar
- Colors: Red, Blue, Yellow>
- Anniversaries: 2 August
- Engagements: Colombian conflict
- Website: www.armada.mil.co/es/content/comando-de-guardacostas

Commanders
- Commander-in-Chief: President Gustavo Petro Urrego
- Commander of the Military: Francisco Cubides Granados
- Commandant of the Navy: Evelio Ramírez Gáfaro
- Commandant of the Caribbean: Alberto Gutiérrez Herrera
- Commandant of the Caribbean: Ibis Manuel Luna Forbes

Insignia
- Jack

- Jack

- Pennant

The Colombian Coast Guard is the coastal defense, search and rescue, and maritime law enforcement branch of the Military Forces of Colombia. Equipped with modern electronic surveillance and location systems at land stations, the Coast Guard covers the Caribbean and Pacific coasts and focuses on the repression of crime at sea, the control of the preservation of the marine environment and search and rescue operations.

The National Navy, through the Coast Guard, is a military maritime service which performs public safety and environmental functions, as well as protecting economic interests in the maritime areas under its jurisdiction, including the coasts, ports and internal waters of the country. Its characteristic mix of military capabilities, defense and support in humanitarian assistance operations, serves the country in five main functions, which are: sea safety, sea control, sea transit and MIOs.

== History ==
Decree 1874 of August 2, 1979, signed by the President of the Republic of Colombia, created the Coast Guard dependent on the National Navy, with functions within marine waters jurisdictions.

Since then, the Coast Guard, which depends on the National Navy, has a Command, a Maritime Safety Department and an Administrative Department.

It also has 13 units afloat, crewed by 171 sailors, operating in the Colombian Atlantic. They are responsible for ensuring maritime security and the interests of the nation in the areas of jurisdiction.

In 1993, the Coast Guard activated a Command in the Pacific to attend simultaneously to both seas and thus fulfill its functions of defense of national sovereignty, control of fishing, repression of contraband, search and rescue, protection of the marine environment and natural resources.

In addition to these functions, the Coast Guard controls illegal migration and immigration, collaborates with oceanographic and hydrographic investigations, protects the nation's renewable and non-renewable resources, controls maritime traffic and supports government and private activities at sea.

== Functions ==
The general functions of the Coast Guard stations are to develop and carry out inspection programs for vessels and boats in general, to carry out search and rescue operations, and to conduct operations against illegal activities.

== Bases ==
In the Caribbean, the places chosen to install the stations are Cartagena, Barranquilla, Santa Marta, Coveñas, Turbo, Riohacha, Puerto Bolivar (Guajira), Puerto Estrella, Castilletes, Sapzurro, San Andrés, Providencia and Serranilla.

On the other hand, the sites that will have coast guard stations on the Pacific coast will be: Buenaventura, Juradó, Bahía Solano, Nuquí, Bahía Málaga, Charambirá (mouths of the San Juan), Guapi, Gorgona, Malpelo, Tumaco and Cabo Manglares.

== Equipment ==
=== Vessels ===
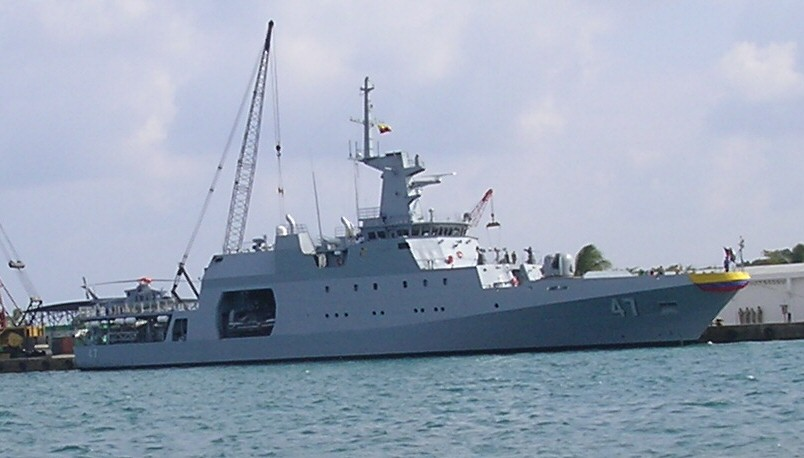
ARC 7 de Agosto (PZE-47), a Colombian-built large offshore patrol vessel

In keeping with its three major operational scenarios: blue-water operations, littoral/riverine operations and coast guard, the ARC maintains a mix of ships suited to each of those profiles. The scope of its operation has been historically oriented towards lightly armed coastal patrol, and as such, the majority of its vessels had been usually mid-size cutters. Traditionally, the ARC has had strong ties to the American and German navies and shipbuilders, and much of its equipment traces its roots to them.

=== Aircraft ===
The Navy Aviation Command operates approximately 17 fixed and rotary wing aircraft for naval surveillance and patrol, Search and Rescue (SAR), and logistical support of naval facilities and operations.

== See also ==
- Colombian Navy
- Coast guard
- Military Forces of Colombia
