= Escuela Superior de Guerra (Colombia) =

The Escuela Superior de Guerra, known in English as the Superior War College is a military college under the Military Forces of Colombia. It was founded in 1909 during the reforms of President Rafael Reyes, himself a former general. Alumni include President Gabriel París Gordillo.
