= Battle of Mindoro =

WWII Allied victory in the Philippines

- Part of the Pacific Theater of World War II
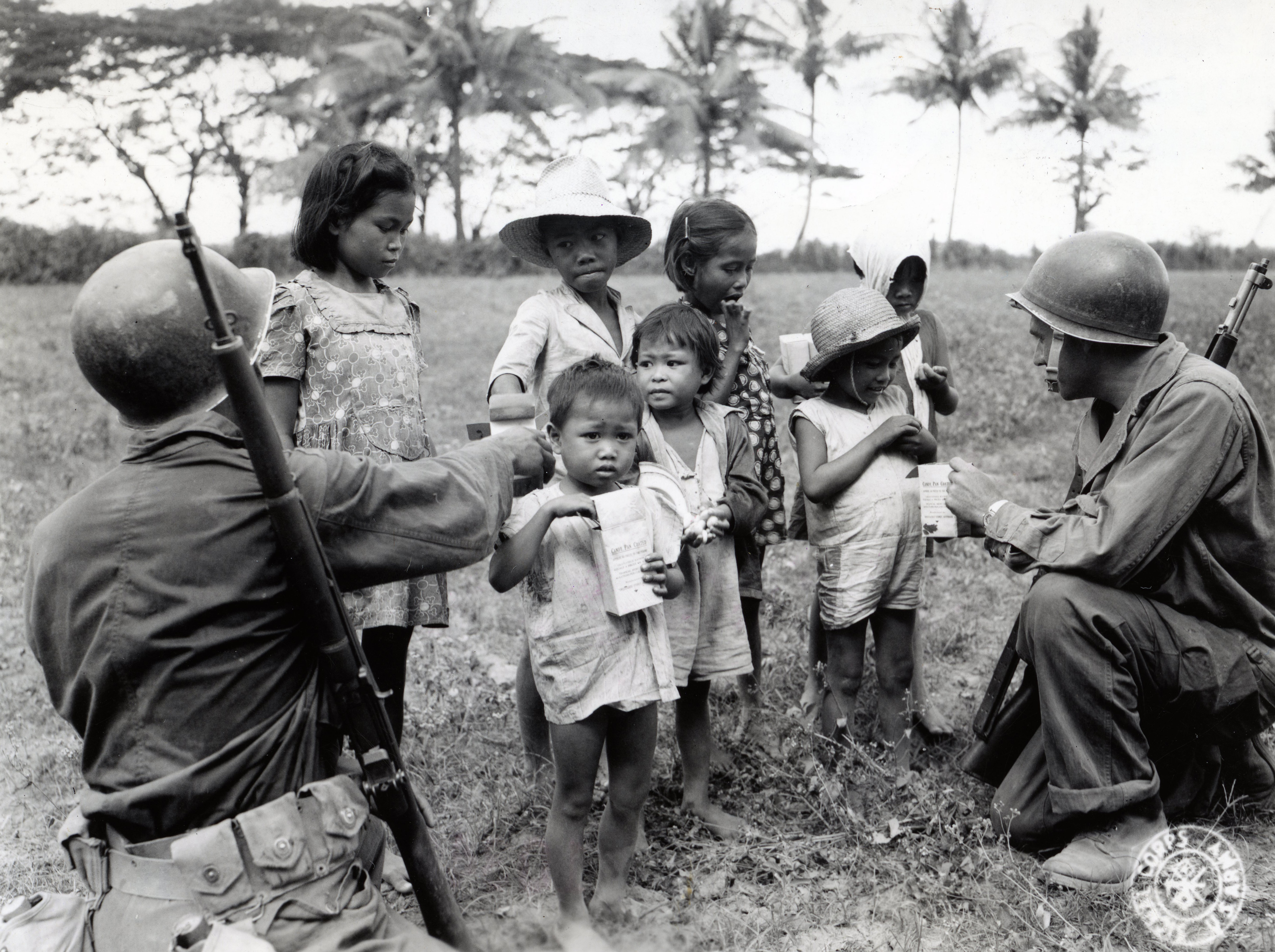
- Left to right: Pfc. Philip H. Dunbar (Worcester, Massachusetts) and Pvt. Si Gerson (New York City) giving Christmas candy to Filipino children in San Jose, Mindoro Island, December 25, 1944
Date	13–16 December 1944; 81 years ago
Location	Mindoro Island, Philippines
Result	Allied victory

Belligerents
United States: Commonwealth of the Philippines; Australia (Note: Royal Australian Navy vessels, and Royal Australian Air Force flying and ground units attached to US commands.)	Japan: Second Philippine Republic

Commanders and leaders
(United States) George M. Jones (United States) Roscoe B. Woodruff	(Empire of Japan) Rikichi Tsukada

Strength
10,000 American troops	1,200 Japanese troops

Casualties and losses
151 killed (18 Army, 133 Navy); 271 wounded (81 Army, 190 Navy)	~200 dead 15 captured 375 wounded

The Battle of Mindoro (Filipino: Labanan sa Mindoro) took place during World War II between the forces of the United States and Japan, in Mindoro Island in the central Philippines, from 13 to 16 December 1944, during the Philippines campaign.

Troops of the United States Army, supported by the United States Navy and US Army Air Forces (USAAF), made an amphibious landing on Mindoro and defeated Imperial Japanese Army (IJA) forces there. There was no significant opposition from the Imperial Japanese Navy, nor from the Japanese Army and Navy Air Forces, except for kamikaze (suicide) attacks on American ships.

The Japanese force in Mindoro was not large, and was eliminated in three days. The Army was assisted in the campaign by guerrillas from the local Filipino population.

The US captured Mindoro to establish airfields there, which would be in fighter range of Lingayen Gulf in northern Luzon Island, where the next major amphibious invasion of the Philippines was planned. Ground-based fighter cover was necessary for this operation. Mindoro could also serve as the advanced base for US troops going to fight in Luzon.

== Background ==
For the invasion of Luzon, US forces needed air bases that were closer to the northern island than Leyte Island. Mindoro was the logical choice. Located not too far south of Luzon, and being about one-half the size of New Jersey, Mindoro is mostly covered by hills and mountains, with a few narrow plains along its seacoasts. Almost daily rains and high humidity, caused by clouds moving up from the south trapped by the high peaks made it a breeding ground for malaria and other tropical diseases. However, Japanese defenses on the island were minimal.

The airfields recently constructed at Leyte were deemed unreliable, so potential additional airfields in Mindoro appealed to General of the Army Douglas MacArthur, the commanding general of this theater of operations.

However, taking Mindoro was a daunting task. The northeastern coast was best suited for amphibious landings, but was exposed to what was left of Japanese air power on Luzon, so this was ruled out. The town of San Jose on the southwest corner, though nearer to Mangarin Bay, Mindoro's best deepwater port, was the spot chosen by his planners.

The US Sixth Army under Lieutenant General Walter Krueger was assigned to seize Mindoro. Krueger, in turn, gave the task to Major General Roscoe B. Woodruff's 24th Infantry Division, with the 19th Infantry and the separate 503rd Parachute Regimental Combat Team of Lieutenant Colonel George M. Jones to spearhead the assault.

The main threat to the amphibious assault vessels and supporting warships was land-based Japanese kamikaze planes. The Japanese had begun the deadly practice as a desperate measure during the final stages of the Battle of Leyte and widened its use by December 1944.

In early December, USAAF and USN airplanes attacked Japanese air bases to destroy potential kamikazes before they could attack. US aviators claimed more than 700 planes destroyed on the ground.

On 13 December 1944, two days before the scheduled assault on the island, kamikazes struck at the Navy task force bringing the landing force. The light cruiser USS Nashville was hit by a kamikaze, killing over 130 men and wounding another 190. Brigadier General William C. Dunkel, the commander of the landing force, was among the injured. Other kamikaze attacks damaged two tank landing ships (LSTs, for Landing Ship, Tank) and disabled several other ships.

== Battle ==
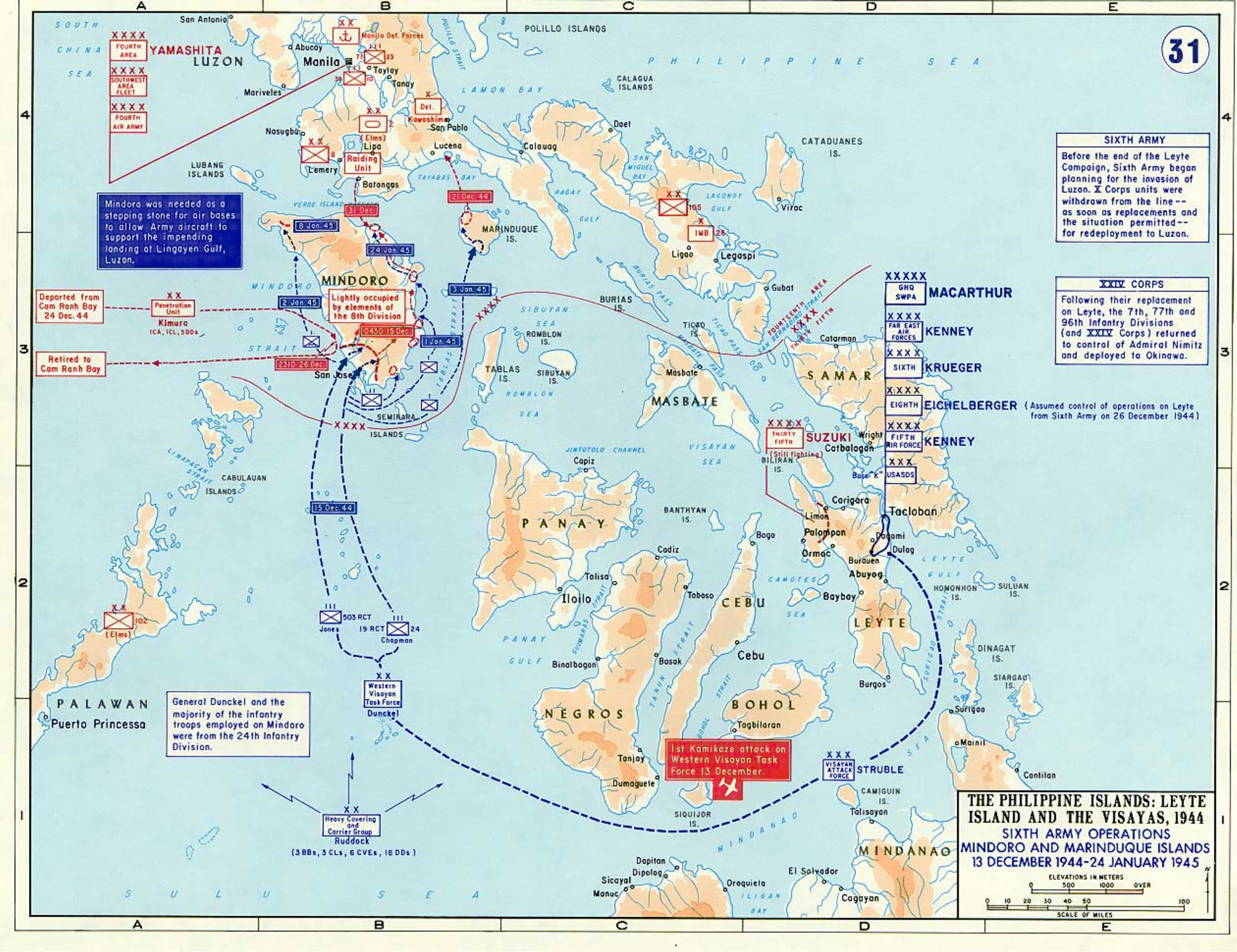
A map of Allied and Japanese movements during the Battle of Mindoro and the occupation of the Marinduque Islands

On 15 December, the invasion of Mindoro began. The clear weather allowed the full use of American air and naval power, including six escort carriers, three battleships, six cruisers and many other support warships against light Japanese resistance. Because of inadequate airstrip facilities in Leyte, the 503rd Parachute Regimental Combat Team came ashore in Mangarin Bay with the landing force instead of jumping. Destroyers provided fire support for the troop landings and anti-aircraft protection for the ships in the transport area. Two LSTs struck by kamikazes were abandoned and sank.

In one heroic action, the destroyer USS Moale (DD-693), under the command of Commander Walter M. Foster, went alongside the burning LST-738 (which was loaded with aviation fuel and ordnance) to rescue crewmembers. Several explosions aboard LST-738 caused damage to Moale as she pulled away. Some pieces of shrapnel were two feet square and they put four holes in Moale's hull. Gunner's Mate Ed Marsh reported that a one-gallon jar of vaseline from the LST's cargo splattered on one barrel of his twin 40 mm Bofors AA gun, providing unwelcome lubrication. Moale suffered one fatality and thirteen wounded. In addition, Moale also rescued 88 survivors.

There were 1,000 defending Japanese soldiers stationed on Mindoro. Another 200 survivors from ships sunk off Mindoro en route to Leyte were also present. The defenders were outnumbered and outgunned. Some 300 Japanese manning an air raid warning station at the island's northern end put up a stiff fight against a company of the 503rd, but except for mopping up, the island was secure within 48 hours.

== Aftermath ==
The defending Japanese forces on Mindoro suffered some 200 killed and 375 wounded. The survivors fled into the jungles, where they lurked till the end of the war. The 24th Infantry Division lost 18 men and had 81 wounded.

By the end of the first day, United States 1874th Engineering Aviation Battalion and No. 3 Airfield Construction Squadron Royal Australian Air Force were at work preparing airfields. Two were completed in thirteen days. These airfields allowed US aircraft to provide direct support for the Luzon invasion. The Mindoro airfields were also used by long-range bombers, especially USAAF B-24 Liberators, to attack Japanese shipping from Formosa to Luzon. These bombers also operated over the South China Sea, and combined with the Navy to blockade shipping between Japan and south-east Asia.
