= Military Forces of Colombia =

Combined military services of Colombia

- Fuerzas Militares de Colombia
- The tri-service badge

- Flag
- Founded: 7 August 1819 (207 years, 95 days)
- Service branches: Colombian National Army; Colombian National Navy; Colombian Naval Infantry; Colombian Aerospace Force; De-facto auxiliary branch: National Police of Colombia (as a Public Force gendarmerie under National Defense Ministry)
- Headquarters: Ministry of National Defense, Bogota D.C.

Leadership
- Commander-in-Chief: President Abelardo de la Espriella
- Minister of Defense: Jorge Eduardo Mora
- General Commander: General Hugo Alejandro López

Personnel
- Military age: 18
- Conscription: 18 months (Army and Aerospace Force); 24 months (Navy); 12 Months (National Police)
- Active personnel: 429 000
- Reserve personnel: 998 000

Expenditure
- Budget: 60 Trillion COP; US$14.37 billion (2025)
- Percent of GDP: 4.1% (2025)

Industry
- Domestic suppliers: CIAC; COTECMAR; INDUMIL
- Foreign suppliers: Austria; Belgium; Brazil; Canada; France; Germany; Spain; Italy; Sweden; South Africa; South Korea; Russia; United Kingdom; United States Historical: Israel

Related articles
- History: Military history of Colombia
- Ranks: Military ranks

The Military Forces of Colombia (Spanish: Fuerzas Militares de Colombia) are the unified armed forces of the Republic of Colombia. They consist of the Colombian Army, the Colombian Navy and the Colombian Aerospace Force. The National Police of Colombia, although technically not part of the military, is controlled and administered by the Ministry of National Defence, and national conscription also includes service in the National Police, thus making it a de facto gendarmerie and a branch of the military. The president of Colombia is the military's commander-in-chief, and helps formulate defence policy through the Ministry of National Defence, which is in charge of day-to-day operations.

The Military Forces of Colombia have their roots in the Army of the Commoners (Ejército de los Comuneros), which was formed on 7 August 1819 – before the establishment of the present-day Colombia – to meet the demands of the Revolutionary War against the Spanish Empire. After their triumph in the war, the Army of the Commoners disbanded, and the Congress of Angostura created the Gran Colombian Army to replace it, thus establishing the first military service branch of the country.

The Colombian military was operationally involved in World War II and was the only Latin American country to send troops to the Korean War. Ever since the advent of the Colombian Conflict, the Colombian military has been involved in combat, pacification, counter-insurgency, and drug interdiction operations all over the country's national territory. Recently it has participated in counter-piracy efforts in the Horn of Africa under Operation Ocean Shield and Operation Atalanta.

The military of Colombia is the third largest in the Western Hemisphere in terms of active personnel and has the fourth largest expenditure in the Americas, behind the United States Armed Forces, the Canadian Armed Forces and the Brazilian Armed Forces respectively.

== Services ==
The Colombian Constitution includes two overlapping definitions of what could be defined as 'armed forces' in English:

- The Public Force (La Fuerza Pública): Includes the Military Forces proper and the National Police (Title VII, chapter VII, Art. 216)
- The Military Forces (Las Fuerzas Militares): Includes only the 3 major military service branches: Army, Navy and Aerospace Force (Title VII, chapter VII, Art. 217)

This is a subtle yet important distinction, both in terms of emphasizing the civil nature of the National Police, but also adapting the national police to function as a paramilitary force which can perform military duties as a result of the Colombian Conflict. This has led to some of the most important police units adopting military training and conducting special operations alongside the Colombian Army, Aerospace Force, and Navy. Therefore, the functions of the Colombian Police in practical terms are similar to those of a gendarmerie, like the Spanish Civil Guard and the Carabineros de Chile, which maintain military ranks for all police personnel.

== Personnel ==
The Colombian armed forces consist of:
Military Forces:

- Colombian Army
- Colombian Navy – and attached services Marines and Colombian Coast Guard
- Colombian Aerospace Force

And,

- National Police of Colombia

Public Force strength as of April 2014.

Force	Service	Officers	Total
Military	Colombian Army	10,094	246,325
Military	Colombian Navy	2,481	33,824
Military	Colombian Aerospace Force	2,679	13,928
Public	Colombian National Police	6,924	176,557
Total		22,178	470, 634

Military strength

=== Dependencies ===
- Military Medical Corps ('Sanidad Militar') – Medical and Nurse Corps
- Indumil (Industrias Militares – INDUMIL) – Military Industry Depot
- Military Sports Federation (Federación Deportiva Militar – FEDECODEMIL)
- Military Printing (Imprenta Militar)
- Military Museum (Museo Militar) – History of the Armed Forces of Colombia
- Superior War College (Escuela Superior de Guerra – ESDEGUE)

== Funding ==
In 2000, Colombia assigned 3.9% of its GDP to defense. By 2008 this figure had risen to 4.8%, ranking it 14th in the world. The armed forces number about 250,000 uniformed personnel: 145,000 military and 105,000 police. These figures do not include assistance personnel such as cooks, medics, mechanics, and so on. This makes the Colombian military one of the largest and most well-equipped in Latin America. Many Colombian military personnel have received military training assistance directly in Colombia and also in the United States. The United States has provided equipment and financing to the Colombian military and police through the military assistance program, foreign military sales, and the international narcotics control program, all currently united under the auspices of Plan Colombia. In 2025, Colombia maintained one of Latin America's largest defense establishments, allocating $14.5 billion to defense. This represented 3.2% of the country's GDP.

== Rank Insignia ==
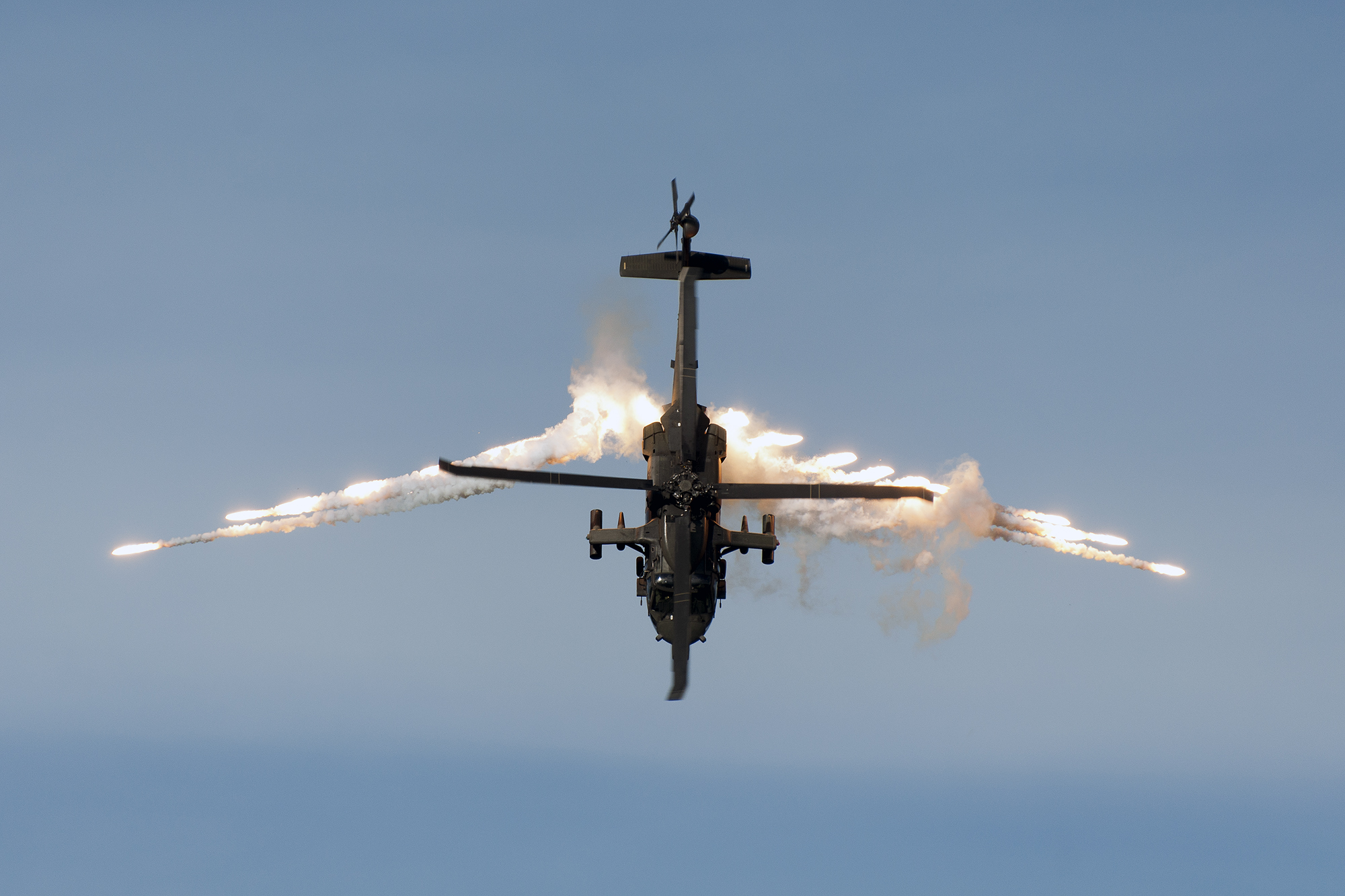
Colombian Aerospace Force Sikorsky UH-60L Arpía III (S-70A-41) just after having launched several flares.

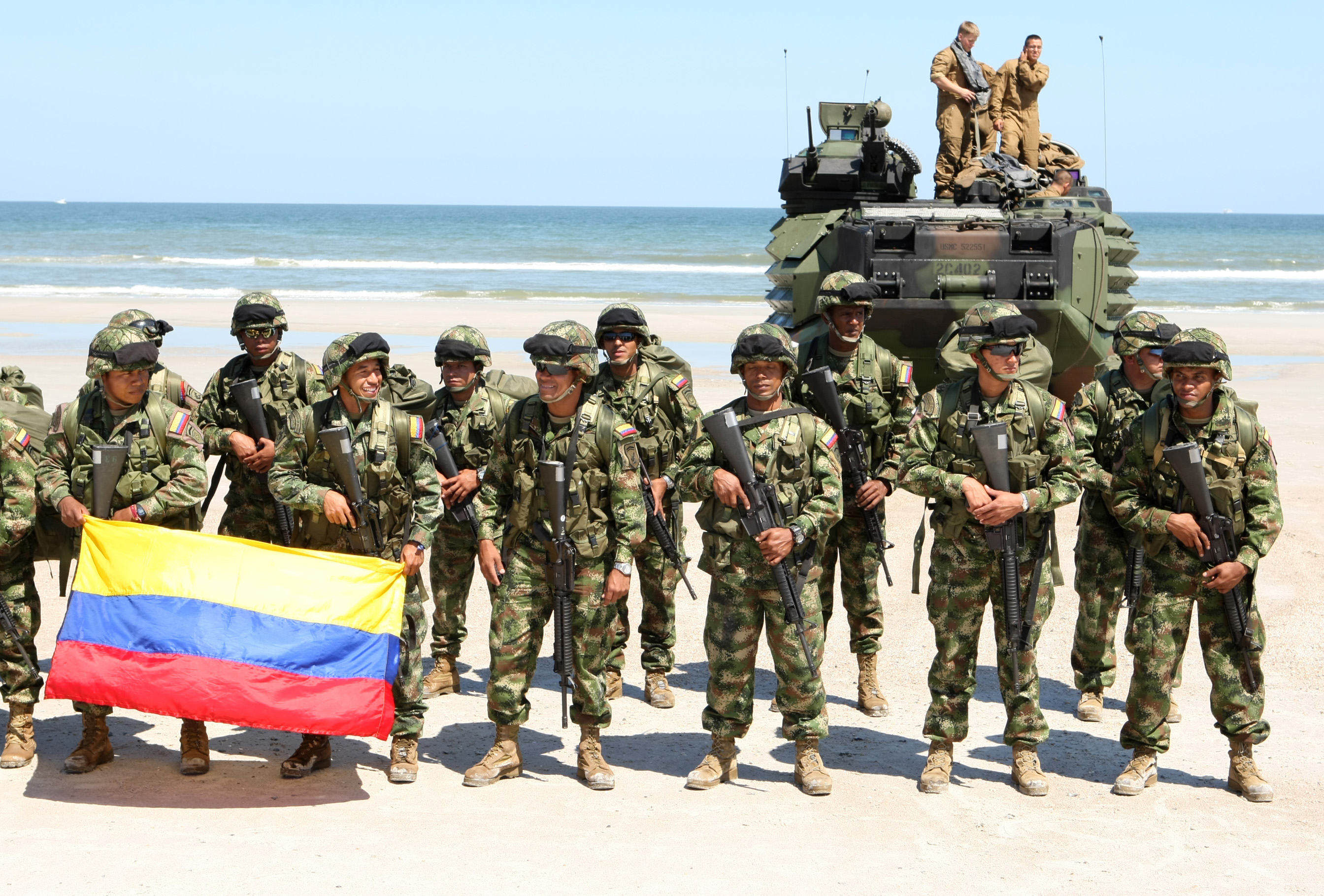
Colombian Marines

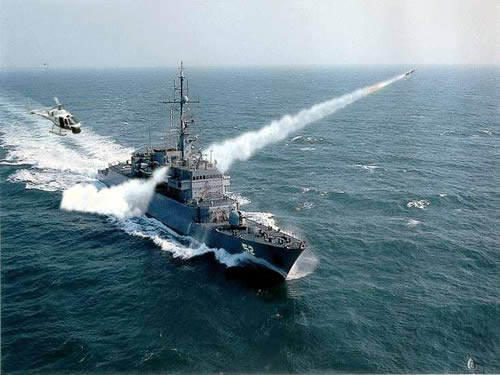
Colombian Navy Frigate ARC Caldas

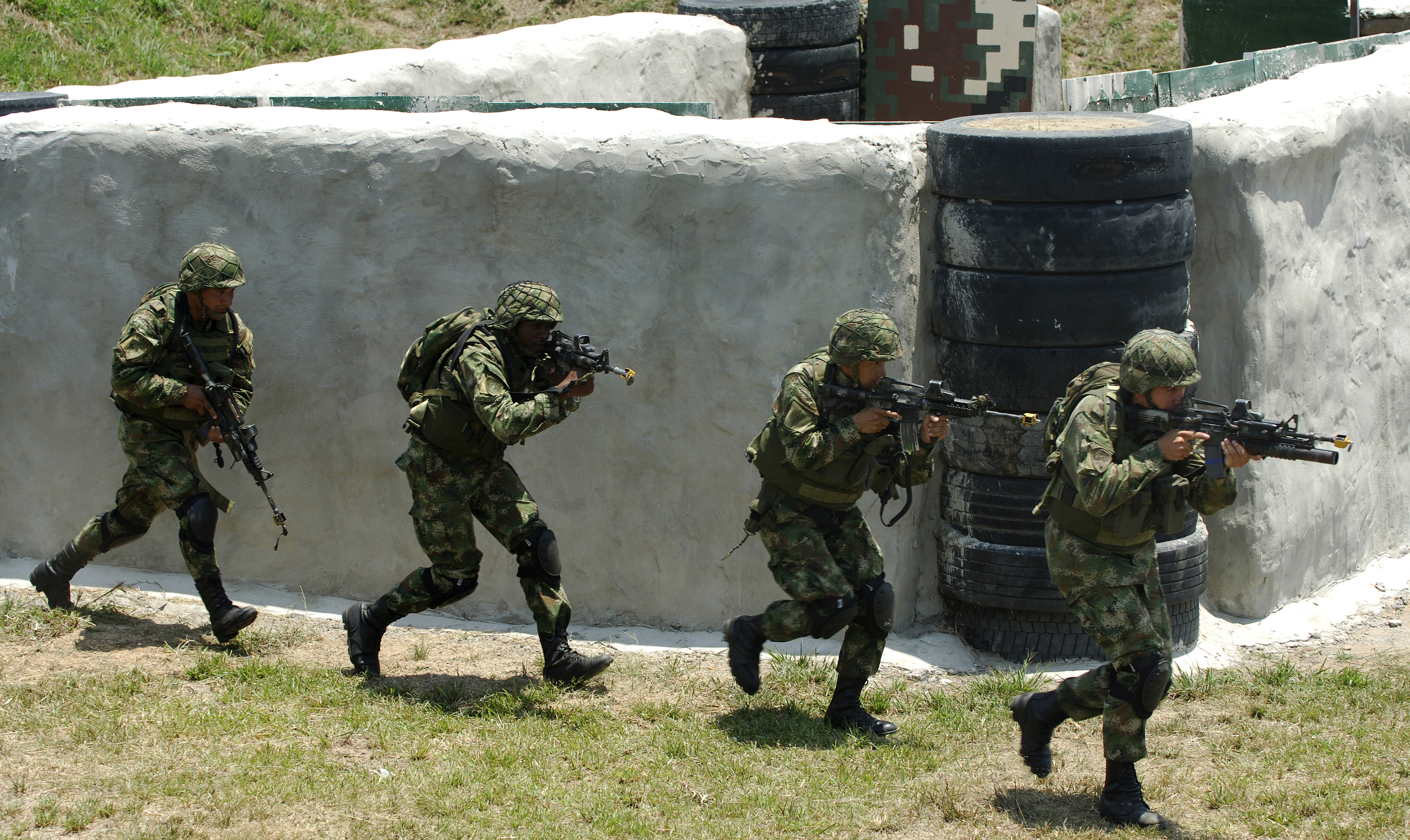
Colombian Special Forces soldiers

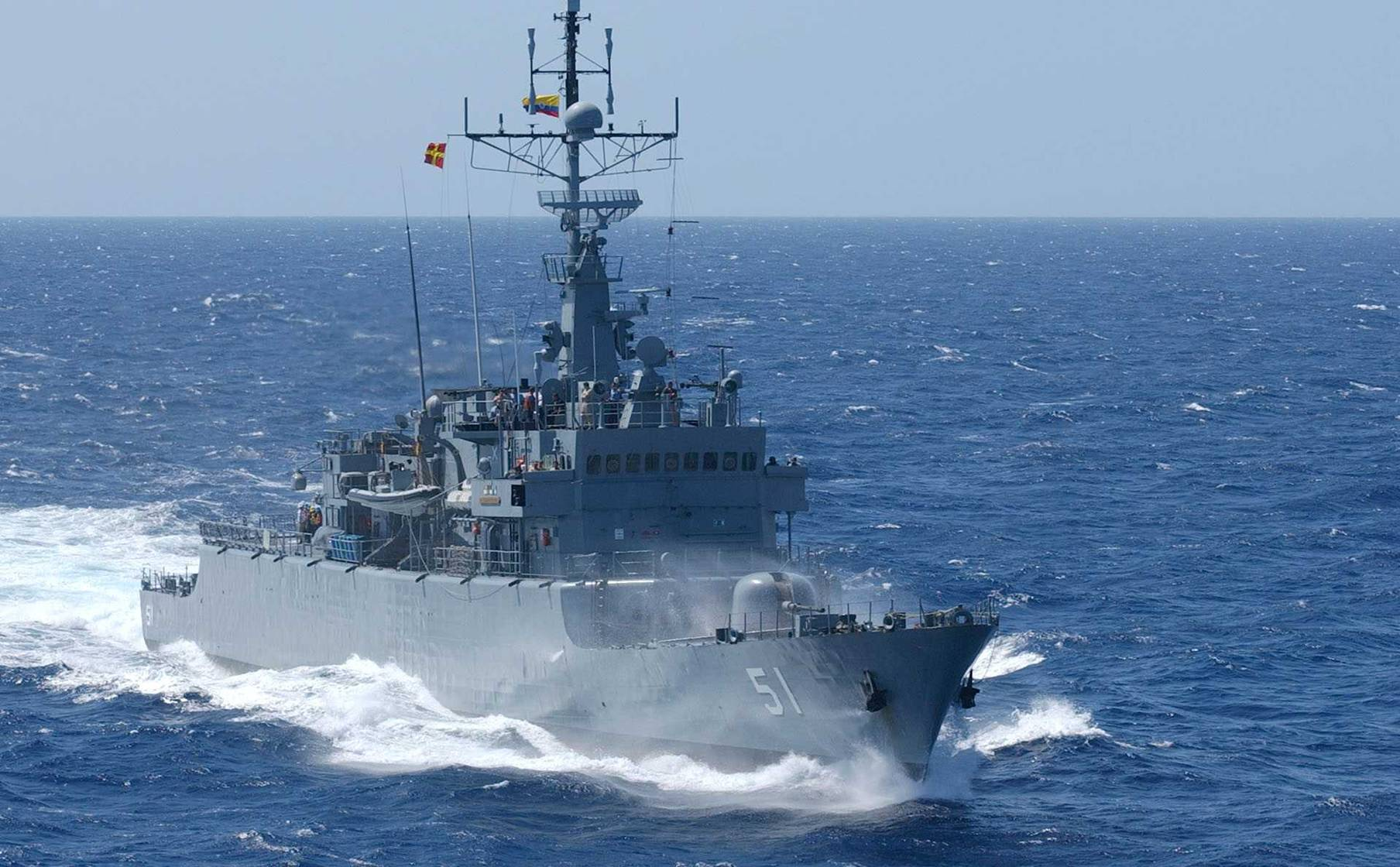
A vessel of the Colombian Navy

== See also ==
- AFEUR
- Colombia
- Colombian Army
- Colombian military decorations
- Indumil
- Joint Task Force OMEGA
- Military ranks of the Colombian Armed Forces

== References and notes ==
- Includes 435 sub-officers Spanish: Suboficiales and 3,125 agents Spanish: Agentes
- Includes 123,125 executive personnel Spanish: Nivel Ejecutivo and 23,562 Auxiliary conscript Spanish: Auxiliares

== Bibliography ==
- International Institute for Strategic Studies (14 February 2018). The Military Balance 2018. London: Routledge. ISBN 9781857439557.
