= Plan Patriota =

Plan Patriota (In English, Patriot Plan) is a military plan developed by the Government of Colombia with the financial support of the Government of the United States in an effort to uproot the guerrilla groups in Colombia, more specifically the Revolutionary Armed Forces of Colombia (FARC-EP) and the National Liberation Army (ELN). The plan was originally part of the government of President Álvaro Uribe's democratic security doctrine. The plan is also intended to get military presence to the most remote areas of Colombia, where the guerrilla had enclaves, and enable the introduction of social programs. Some analysts consider the plan to be a sort of second phase of Plan Colombia.

The first military operation related to the Plan Patriota was launched in 2004 and was dubbed Operation JM.

== Criticism ==
=== Human rights concerns ===
The José Alvear Restrepo Lawyer’s Collective, a human rights NGO, has criticized Plan Patriota. In April 2008, the Collective mentioned that hearings and judicial processes had provided information describing links between paramilitary forces and the Colombian National Army during Operation Liberty I, a 2003 prelude to Plan Patriota carried out in the area of Viotá, Cundinamarca. According to the Collective, multiple incidents of forced disappearances, torture, extrajudicial executions and forced displacement, among other crimes, took place in the area.

== See also ==
- Plan Colombia
- Fluvial Campaign of the Plan Patriota
